= Nida nudist beach =

Nude beach in Northern Europe

Nida Nudist Beach
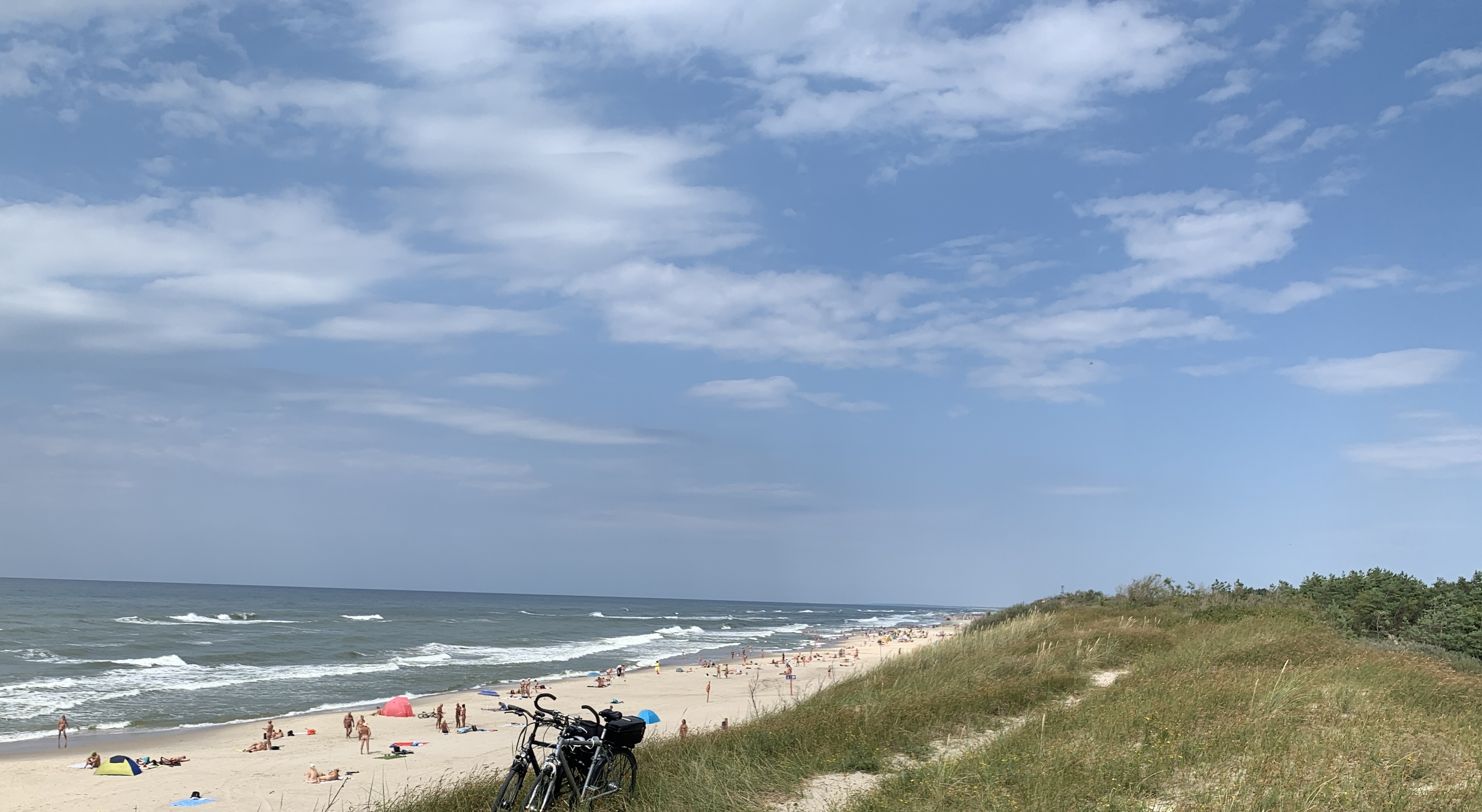
- Sand dunes along Nida Nudist Beach
- Interactive map of Nida Nudist Beach
- Type: Public nude beach
- Location: Nida, Lithuania
- Coordinates: 55°18′1″N 20°58′22″E
- Established: 2008
- Operator: Neringa Municipality
- Habitats: Coastal sand dunes and pine forest
- Designation: Part of Curonian Spit National Park; UNESCO World Heritage Site
- Website: Visit Neringa

Nida nudist beach (Lithuanian: Nidos nudistų paplūdimys) is a designated clothing-optional beach located on the Curonian Spit, near the town of Nida. Officially opened as a naturist beach in 2008, it is recognized as one of the best nudist beaches in Northern Europe.

Nida Nudist Beach offers amenities such as changing cabins and seasonal lifeguard services. Designated areas allow access for dogs, and beach volleyball courts are available in marked zones. The beach is accessed via Nida, a seasonal tourist town on the Curonian Spit. During the summer months, the region attracts an estimated 200,000 to 300,000 visitors. Watersports are popular, with the exception of kitesurfing, which is banned at this beach.

Located along the Baltic Sea within the Curonian Spit National Park, a UNESCO World Heritage Site shared by Lithuania and Russia, the beach is characterized by natural features such as sand dunes, pine forests, and coastal vegetation. It has received Blue Flag status, indicating that it meets international criteria for water quality, environmental management, and public safety.
