= Nida Lighthouse =

Nida Lighthouse Nidos švyturys
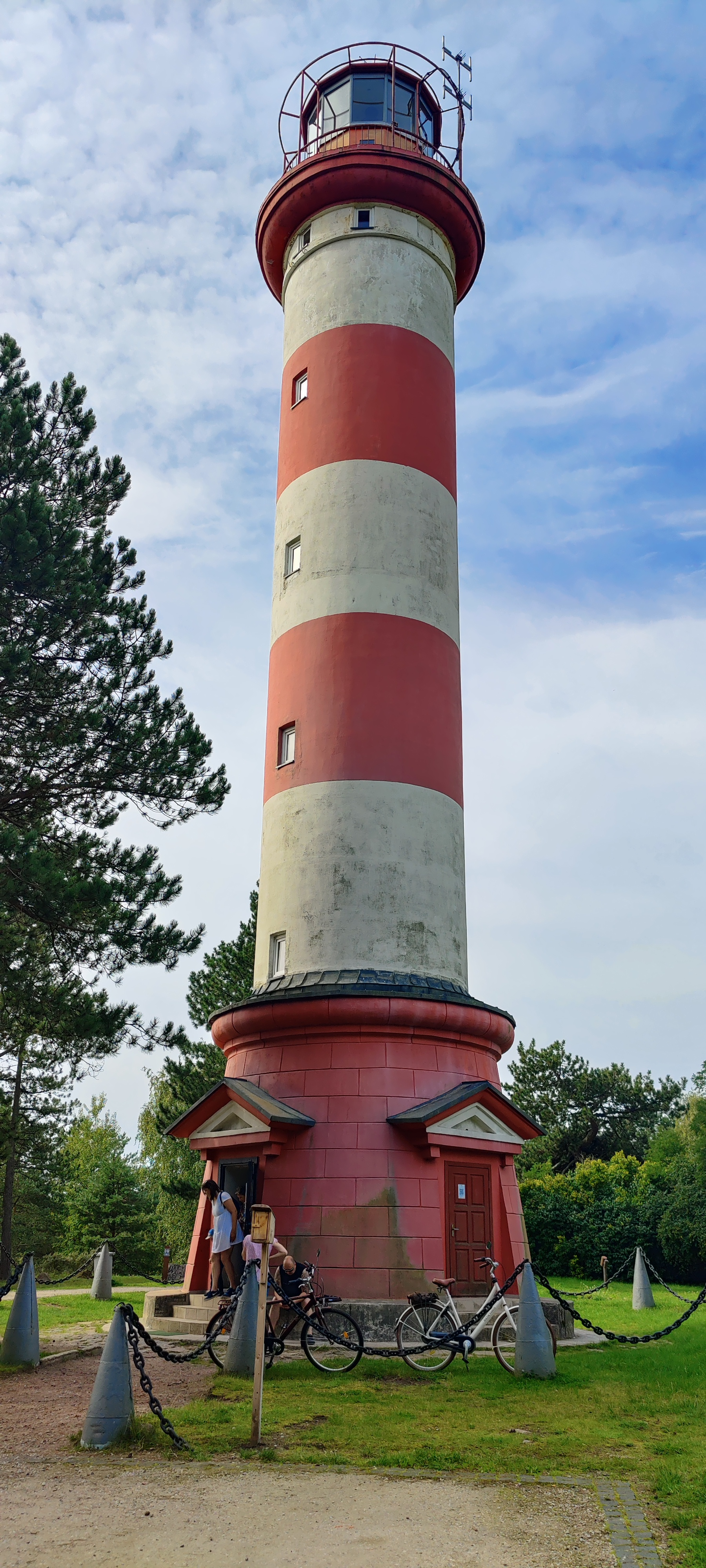
- Location: Nida, Neringa Municipality, Lithuania
- Coordinates: 55°18′18″N 20°59′42″E

Tower
- Constructed: 1945
- Construction: reinforced concrete
- Height: 27 m (89 ft)
- Shape: cylindrical tower with balcony and lantern
- Markings: Red (lantern), Stripe (red and white)
- Operator: Curonian Spit National Park

Light
- First lit: 1945, 1953
- Focal height: 76 m (249 ft)
- Range: 22 nmi (41 km; 25 mi)
- Characteristic: Fl(2) W 5.8s
- Lithuania no.: LT-0050
- Original light
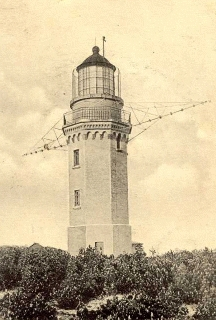
- Constructed: 1874
- Construction: brick (tower)
- Markings: Red (tower)
- First lit: 24 October 1874
- Deactivated: 1944

Nida Lighthouse (Lithuanian: Nidos švyturys) is located in Nida, on the Curonian Spit in between the Curonian Lagoon (to the east) and the Baltic Sea (to the west).

== History ==
The original lighthouse in Nida was constructed in the 1860s and 1870s during the German Unification. Twenty-seven metres high and built of red brick, it had 200 steps, which have survived to this day. It was planned to be 51.4 metres high, on raised ground, and built by prisoners. It was first lit on October 24, 1874.

In 1944, at the end of the Second World War, German soldiers blasted the lighthouse, destroying it. It was rebuilt in 1945 and renovated in 1953. The current lighthouse is built of reinforced concrete with horizontal red and white stripes.

== See also ==
- List of lighthouses in Lithuania
