= David Gottlieb Kuwert =

- Born: c. 1748
- Died: 21 July 1827; Nida, Kingdom of Prussia
- Occupation: Landscaper
- Known for: Landscaping the dunes of Nida

David Gottlieb Kuwert (Lithuanian: Dovidas Gotlybas Kuvertas; c. 1748 – 21 July 1827) was the progenitor of the practice of landscaping and reforestation in the resort of Nida.

== Life ==
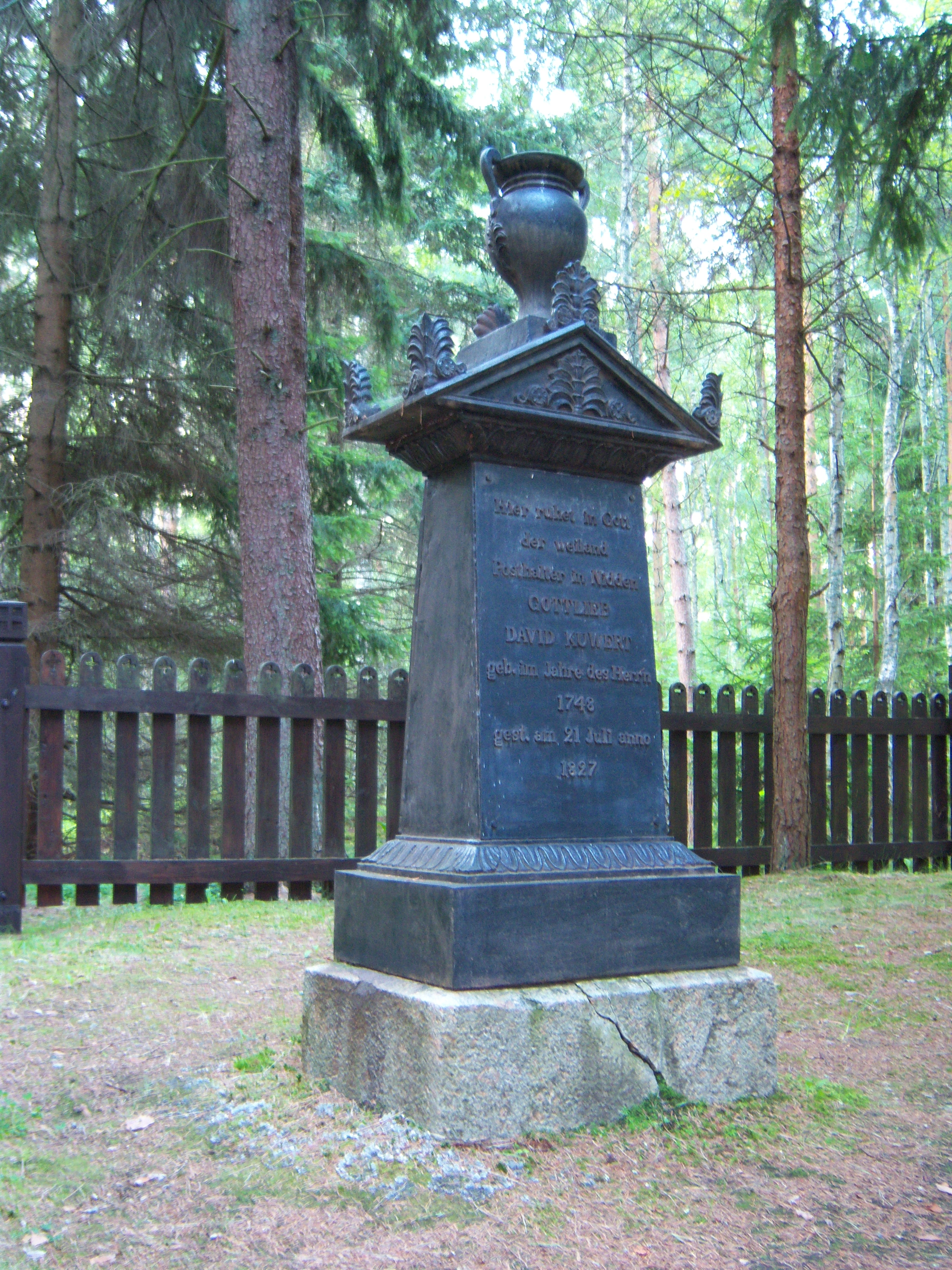
Grave of David Gottlieb Kuwert in Nida, Lithuania

David Gottlieb Kuwert was born around 1748 to Curonian nobility. Kuwert attended the University of Königsberg. He was the only son of Friedrich Casimir Kuwert, who owned a tavern and a post office that was situated at an important point along the postal network of the Curonian Spit coast. After Friedrich Casimir's death, Kuwert inherited his father's property. From the purchased remains of the abandoned Kunzen (Kuncai) church, Kuwert constructed a new building that featured an inn, an apartment, a post office, and guest accommodation.

Due to the approach of nearby dunes in the first half of the 19th century, Kuwert wished to save his and other people's property. Kuwert, as well as his son Georg David Kuwert began planting wind and drought-resistant plant species, pine seedlings, as well as installing windbreaks along the western side of the postal network road. Noticing that Baltic pines were quickly covered with sand, Kuwert was the first to start planting mountain pines. Kuwert died on 21 July 1827 in Nida, and the work was continued by his son Georg David Kuwert.

The successful reinforcement of the sandbanks at the foot of the Urbas dune encouraged the Prussian government to organize landscaping of the Curonian Spit, which was carried out in the late 19th and early 20th centuries by Wilhelm Franz Epha, Gotthilf Hagen, Paul Gerhart, and others.

== Remembrance ==
David Gottlieb Kuwert and Georg David Kuwert were buried near each other in a forest they planted. A monument was erected near the graves with funds raised in Königsberg. Their graves were made a cultural landmark in 1998. They are the namesake of various streets in Nida as well as Suvernai.
