= Krikštas =

Lithuanian form of funerary monument

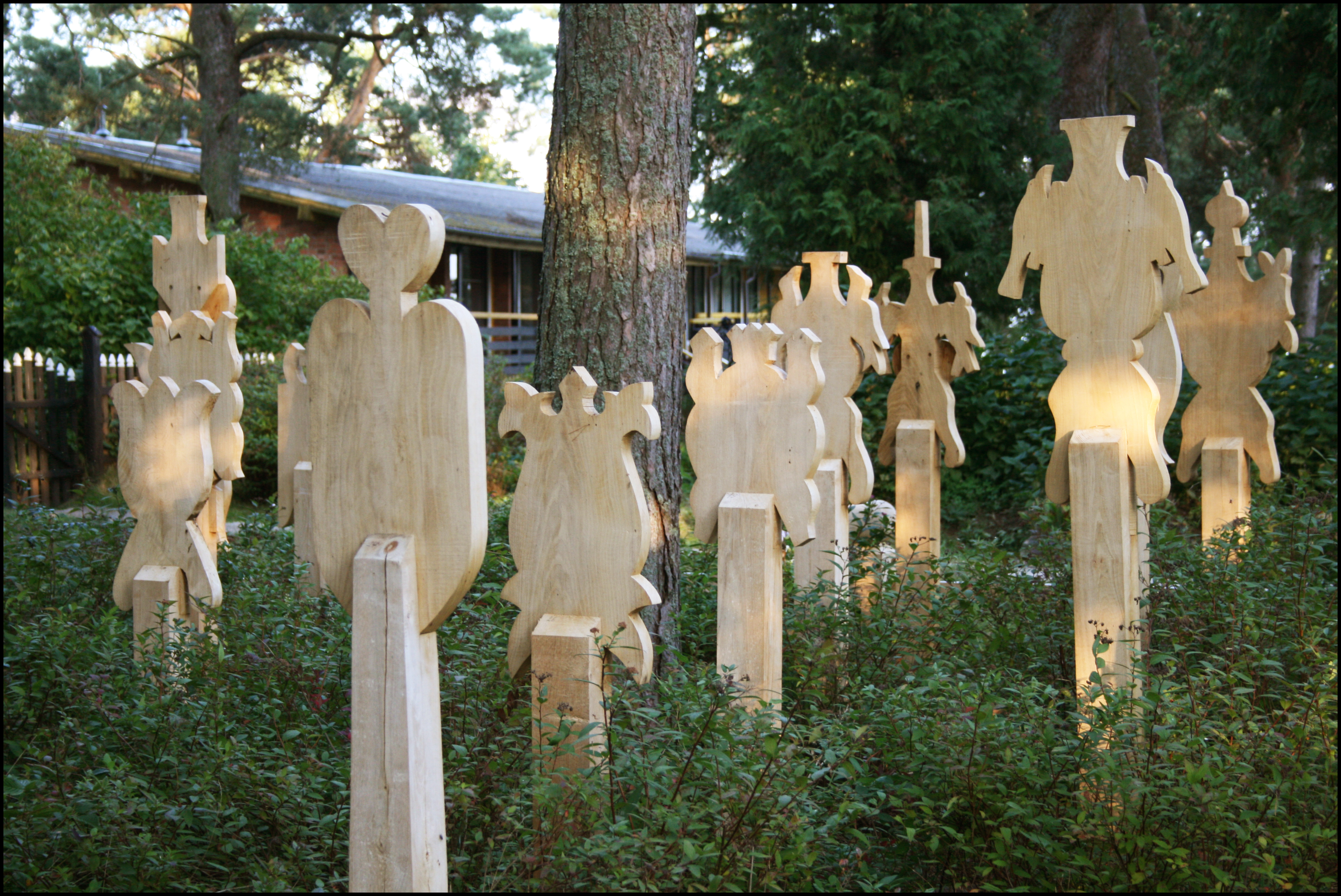
Restored krikštai at the ethnographic cemetery in Nida, Lithuania

Krikštas (plural: krikštai) is a Lithuanian burial monument of oldest type. Typically they are carved of wood. Old krikštai are usually symmetric figurines of horseheads, birds, plants, hearts, etc. Since 19th-century cross-shaped monuments started to appear and the destruction figurine-type krikštai proceeded, since they were considered to be remnants of paganism. The figurine-type were mostly found in Lithuania Minor, in the areas of Protestant faith. Similar tombheads were reported in Protestant areas of Germany and Latvia. Therefore, some question their pagan faith association, and the survival of the tradition from pre-Christian times may be associated with the Protestant prohibition on putting crosses on graves.
