= Port of Nida =

Coordinates: 55°18′11″N 21°0′33″E

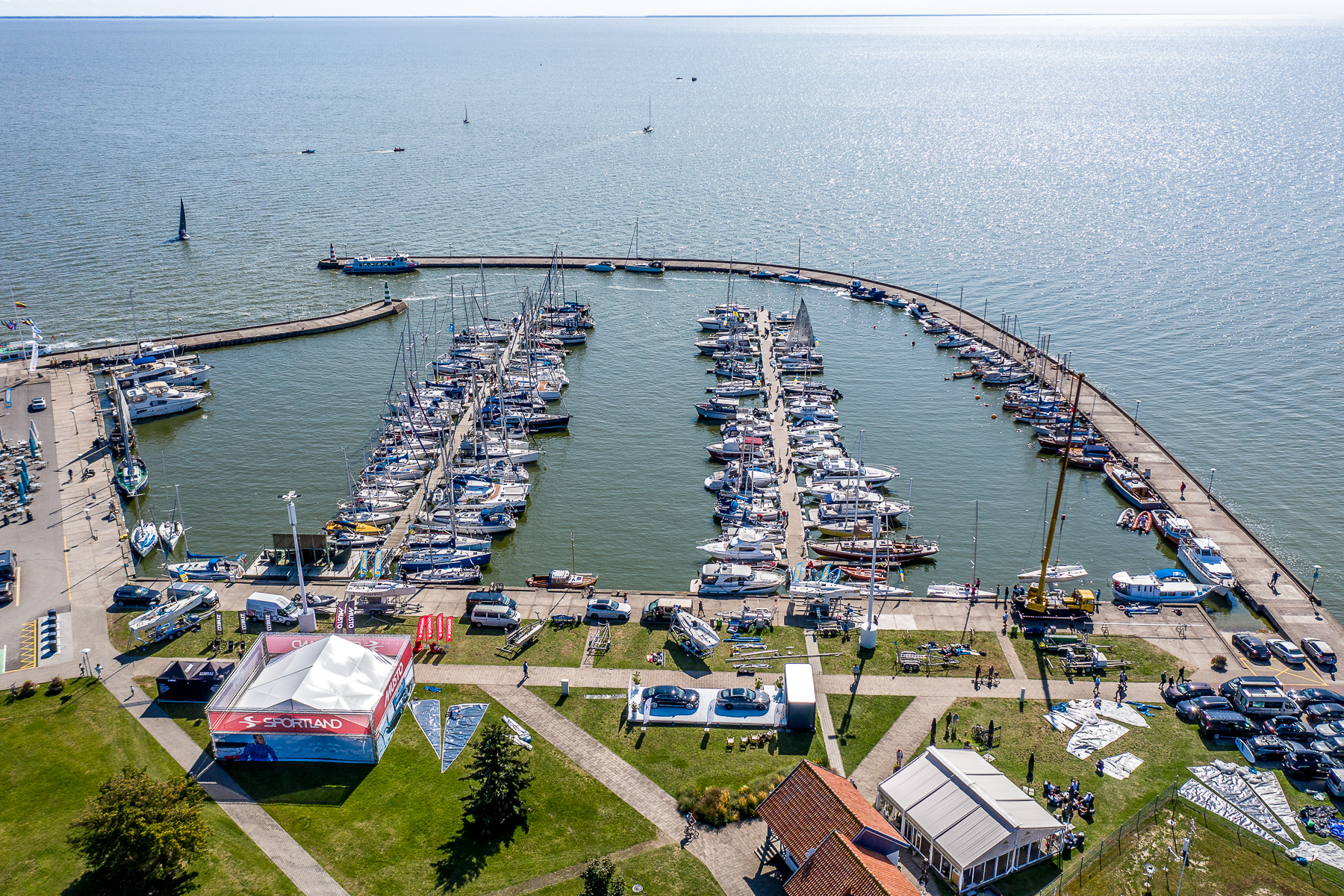
Port of Nida

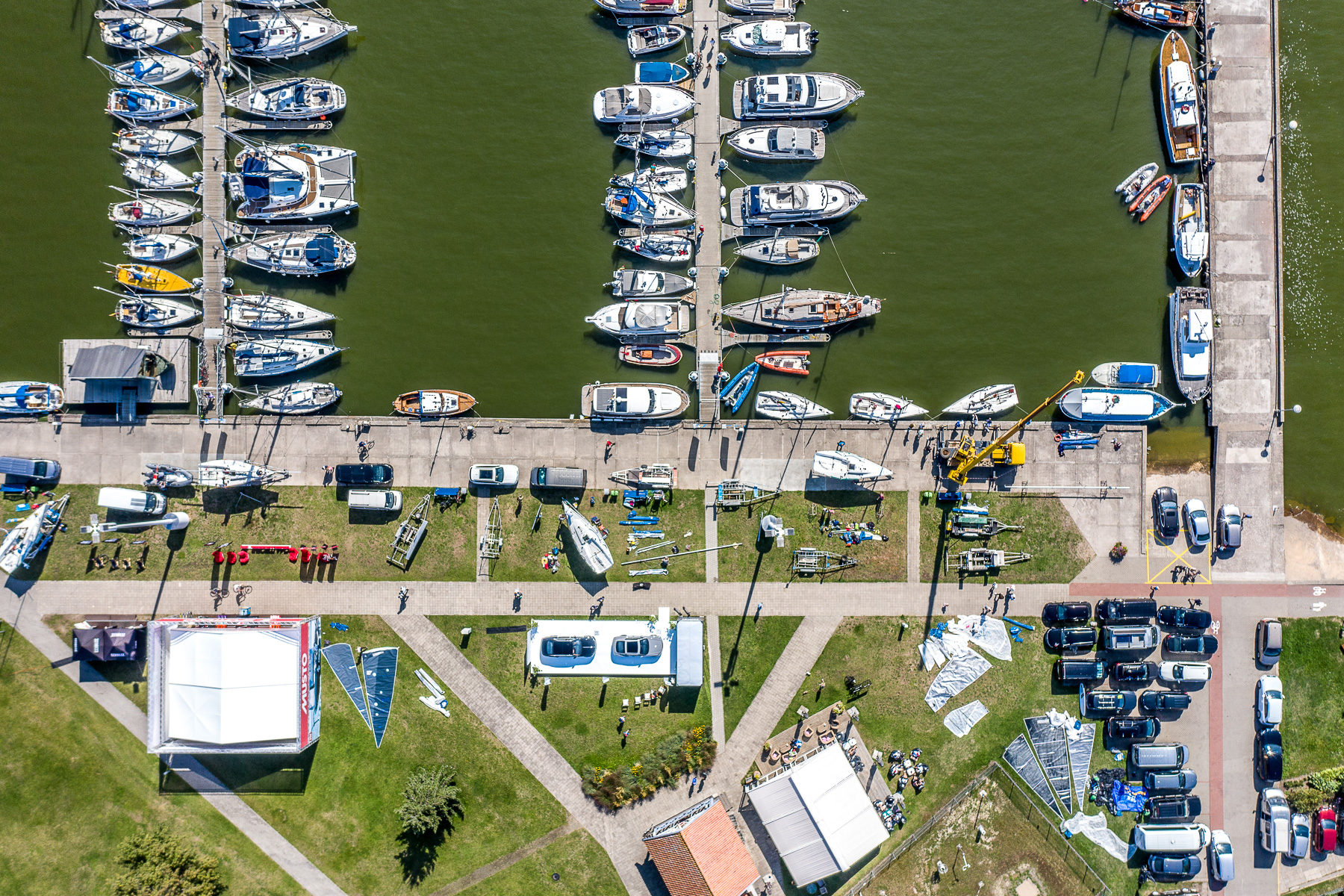
Port of Nida during the 2021 Platu 25 World Championship.

The Port of Nida (Lithuanian: Nidos uostas) is a port in the city of Nida, Lithuania. It is located on the Curonian Lagoon side of the Curonian Spit. It is mostly used for ferries, connection with inland Lithuania and fishing.

The port is located in the oldest part of the town that preserves the initial strict rectangular plan. It started at the end of the 19th century as a fishing port, later extended as a steamboat port.

During Soviet times fishing base was significantly extended, demolishing the former custom office, hotel and part of the old fisherman houses. During this time Port of Nida also started to serve as the terminus of the Kaunas - Nida hydrofoil route (through Nemunas). This route has been discontinued for some time but some sources claim might be available again.

In 1991, the second pier has been was added for passenger boats. Since 1999 the port has been granted the rights of the international port, deciding to restore the border control office. With custom and immigration offices available, Nida Yacht-Club is now capable of accepting sailors from the whole world.

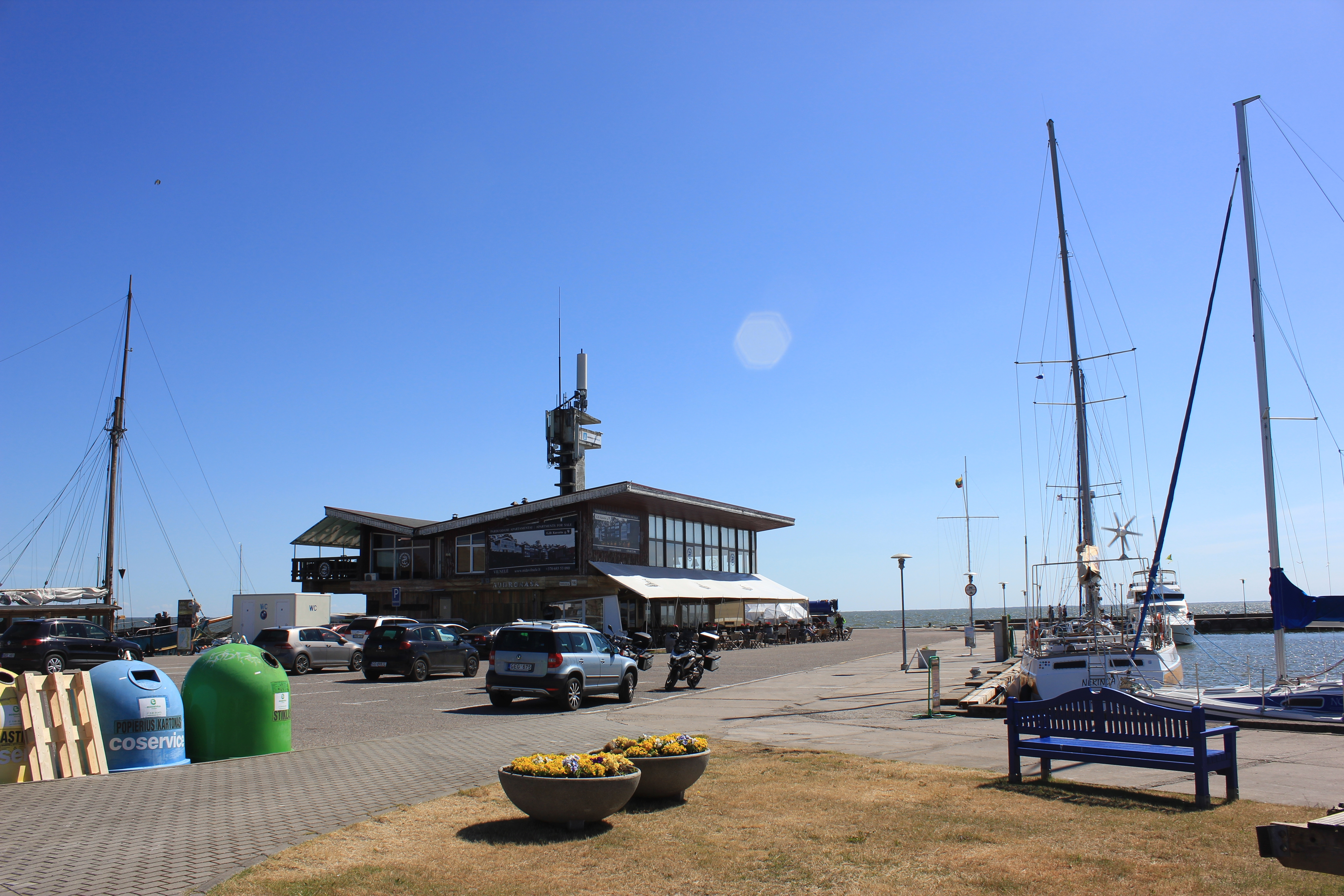
Port authority

Currently the port has the two mooring piers, one for fishing and another for passenger boats. The passenger part has the constant 3 m. depth and 25 m. width. The depth of the fishing section varies between is 2.8–3 m at the center of the pier but drops till 1 m in other places. The port can accommodate 40-60 yachts in total.
