= Nida, Lithuania =

Nida
- Settlement
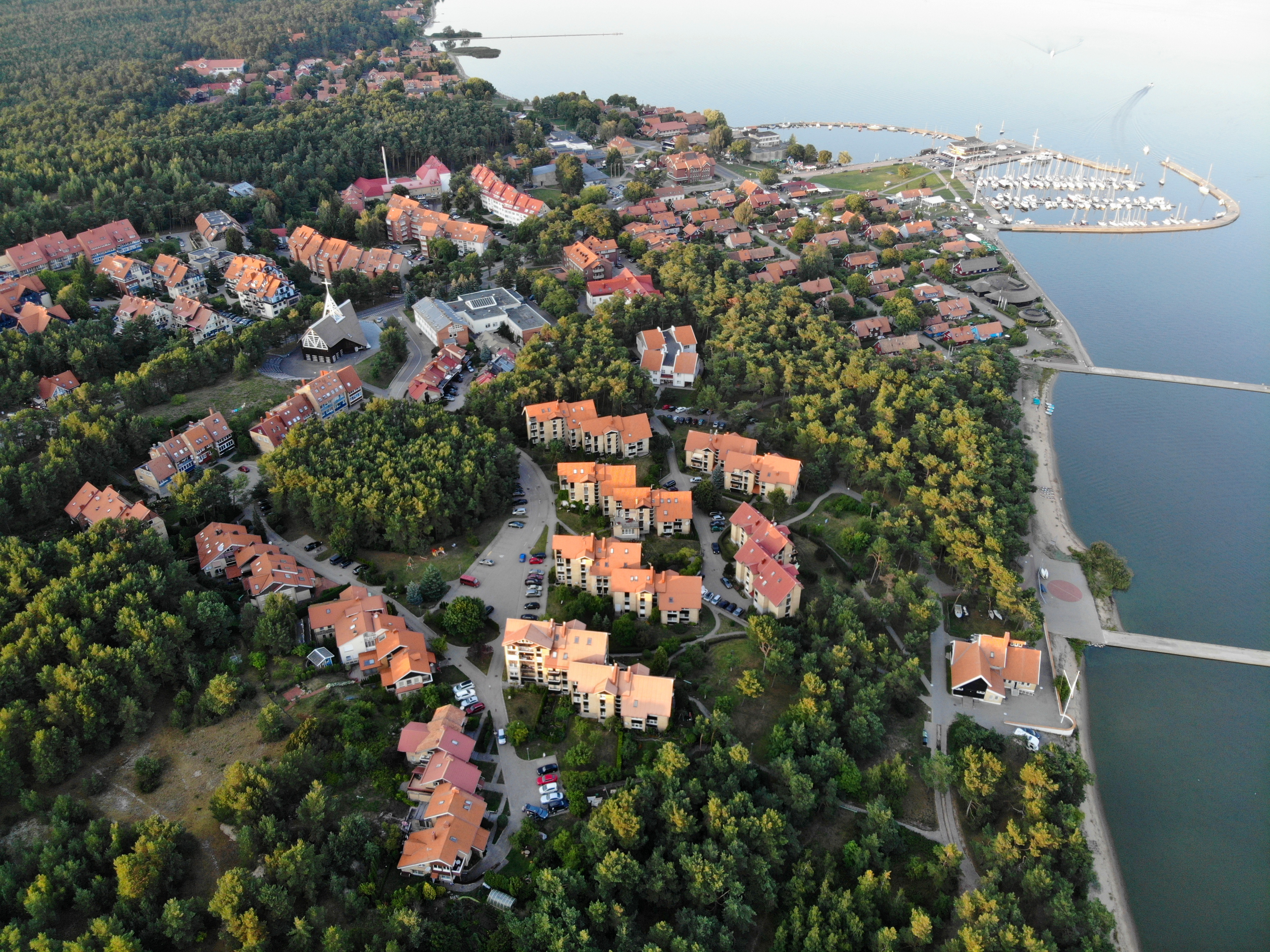
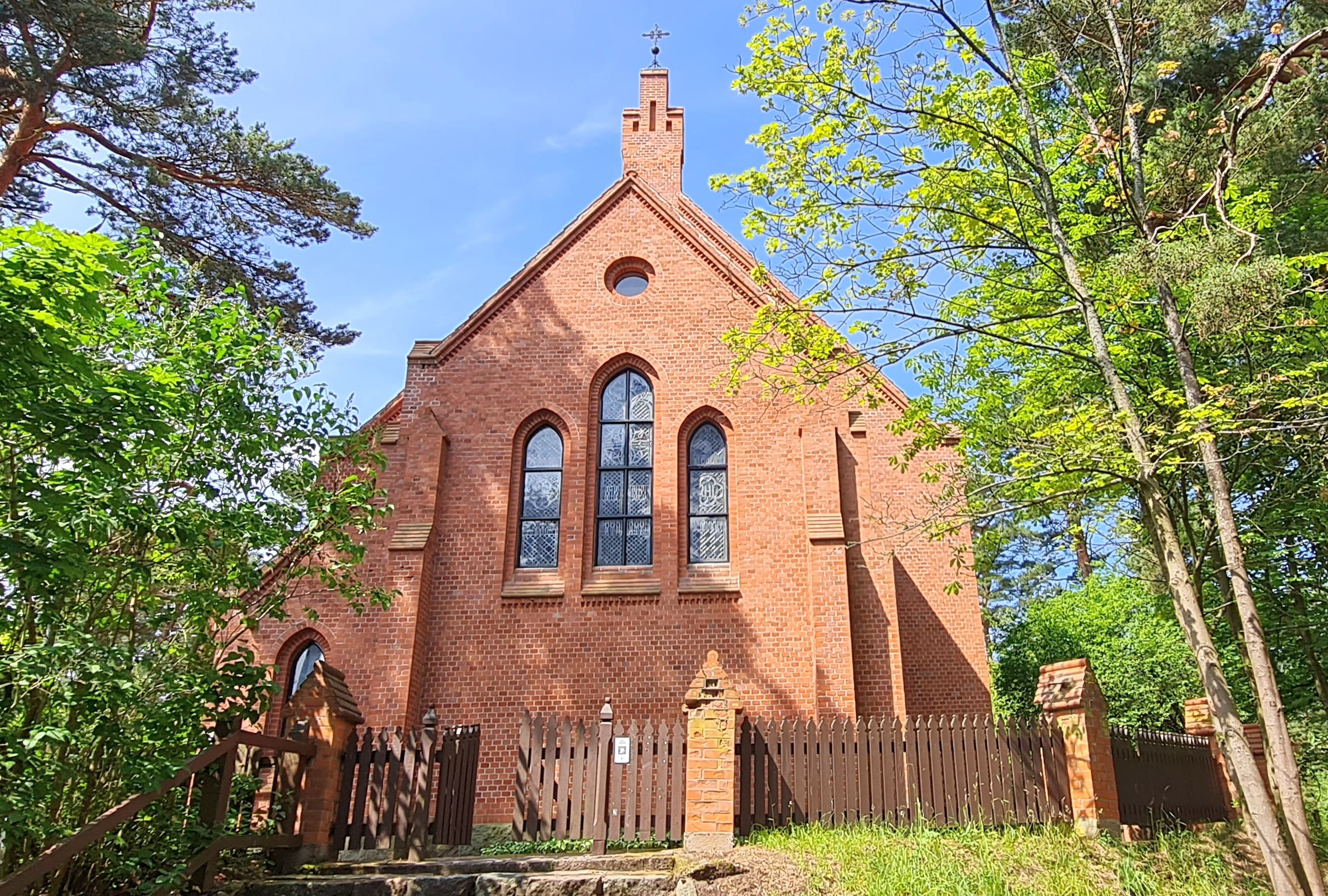
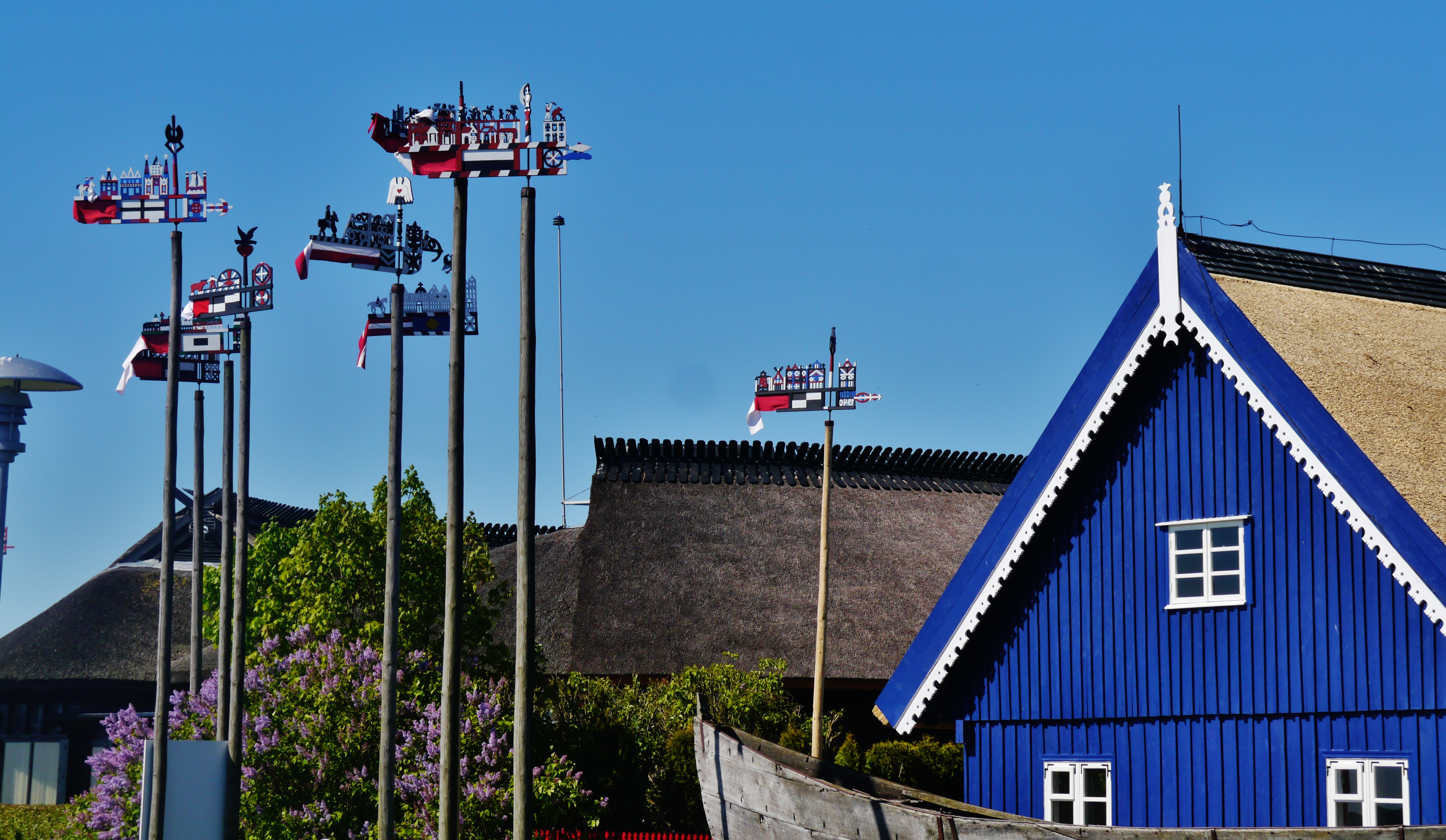
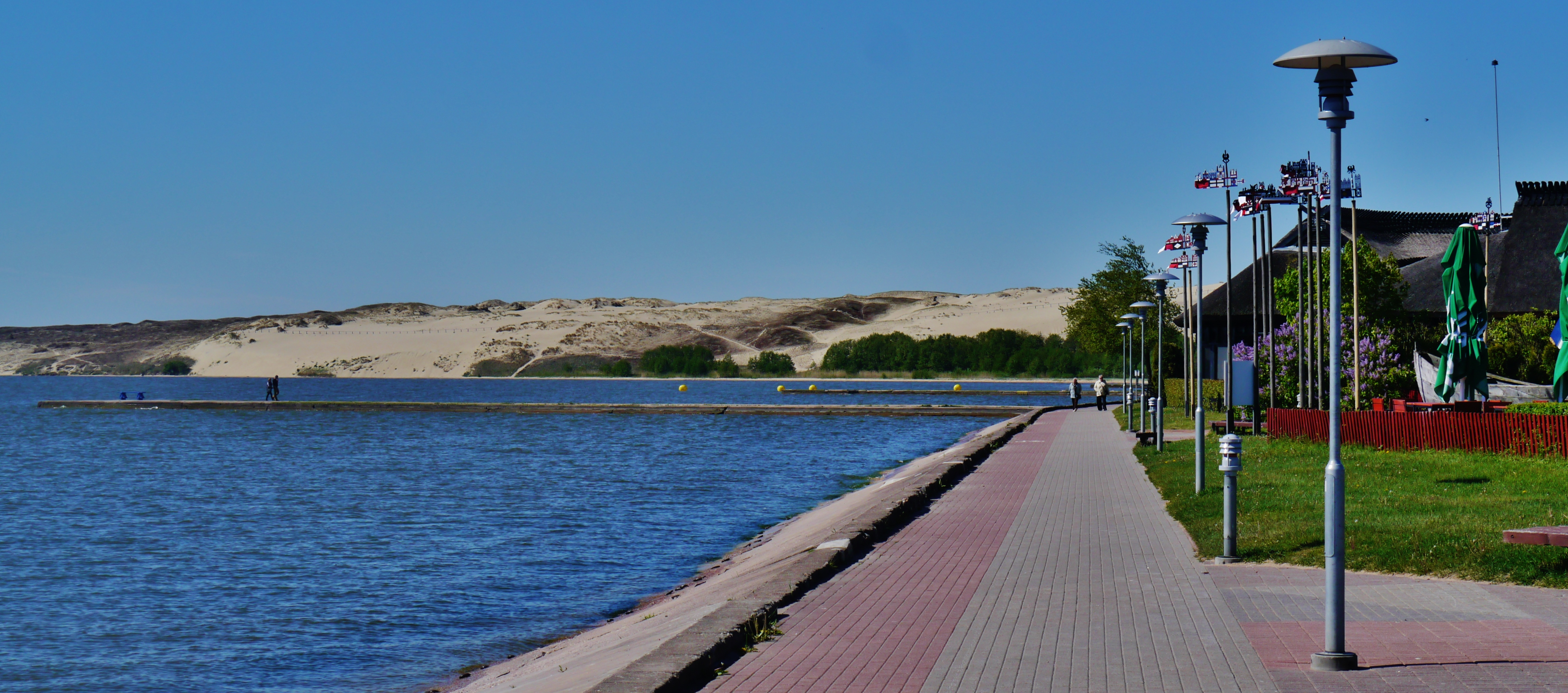
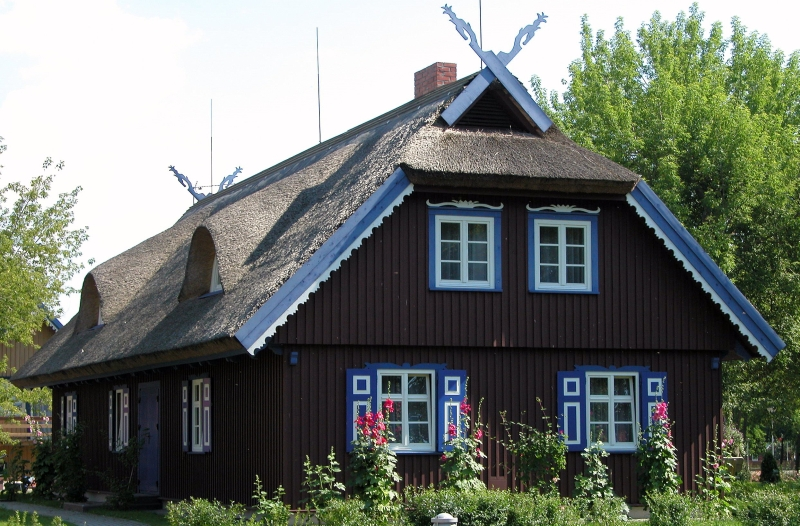
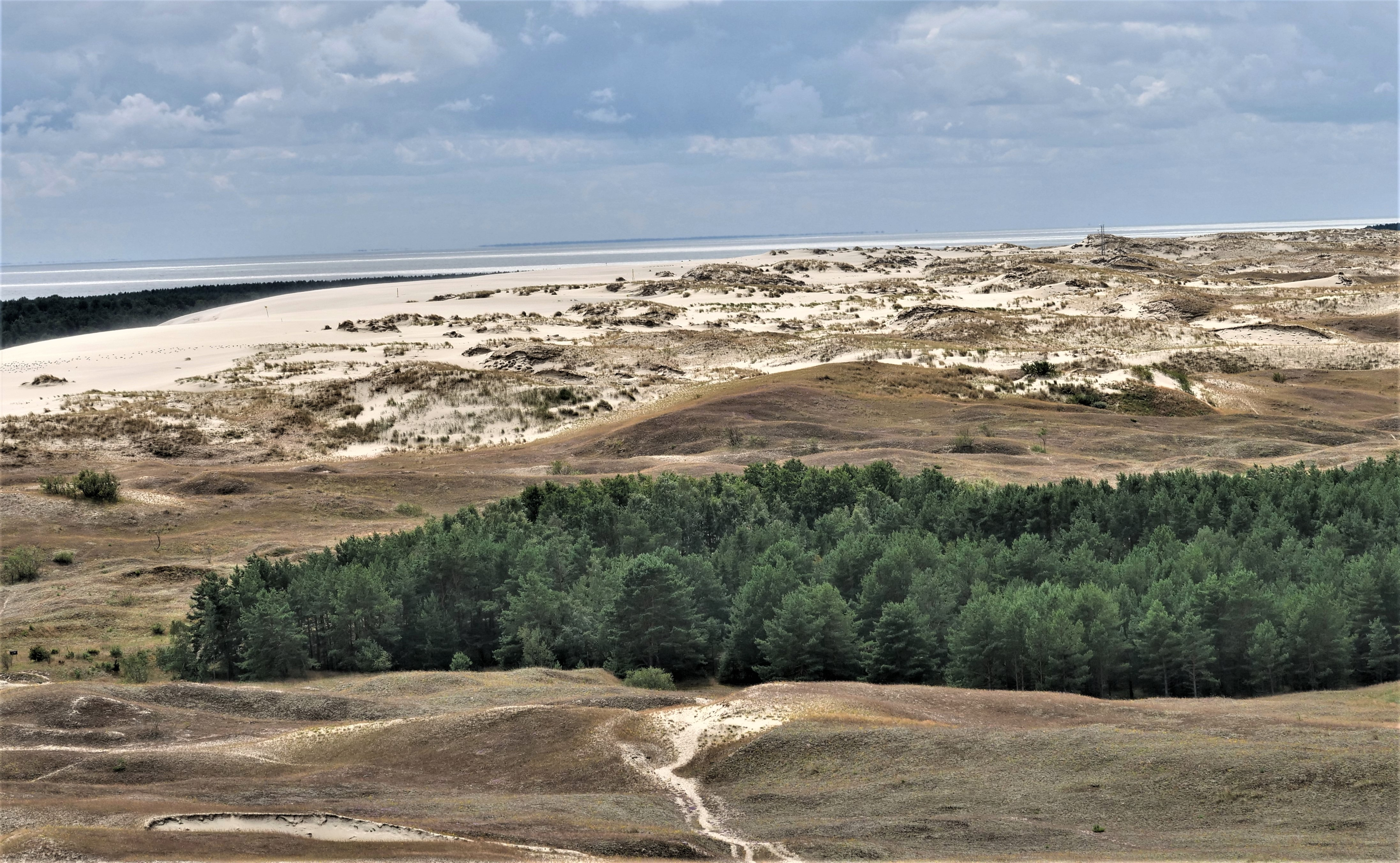
- Aerial view of Nida Evangelical Lutheran Church Curonian weathervanes and traditional houses Coast of the Curonian Lagoon Traditional wooden house Parnidis Dune

- Interactive map of Nida
- Location of Nida Nida (Baltic states)
- Coordinates: 55°18′12″N 21°00′20″E
- Country: Lithuania
- County: Klaipėda County
- Municipality: Neringa Municipality
- Eldership: Juodkrantė eldership
- First mentioned: 1358

Population (2025)
  - Total: 1,500 permanent residents
- Demonym: nidiečiai (Lithuanian)
- Time zone: UTC+2 (EET)
  - Summer (DST): UTC+3 (EEST)

Nida (German: Nidden, Kursenieki: Nīde) is a resort settlement in Lithuania, the administrative centre of Neringa municipality. Located on the Curonian Spit between the Curonian Lagoon and the Baltic Sea, it is the westernmost point of Lithuania and the Baltic states, close to the border with the Russian Kaliningrad Oblast exclave. In 2025, it had around 1500 permanent residents.

== History ==
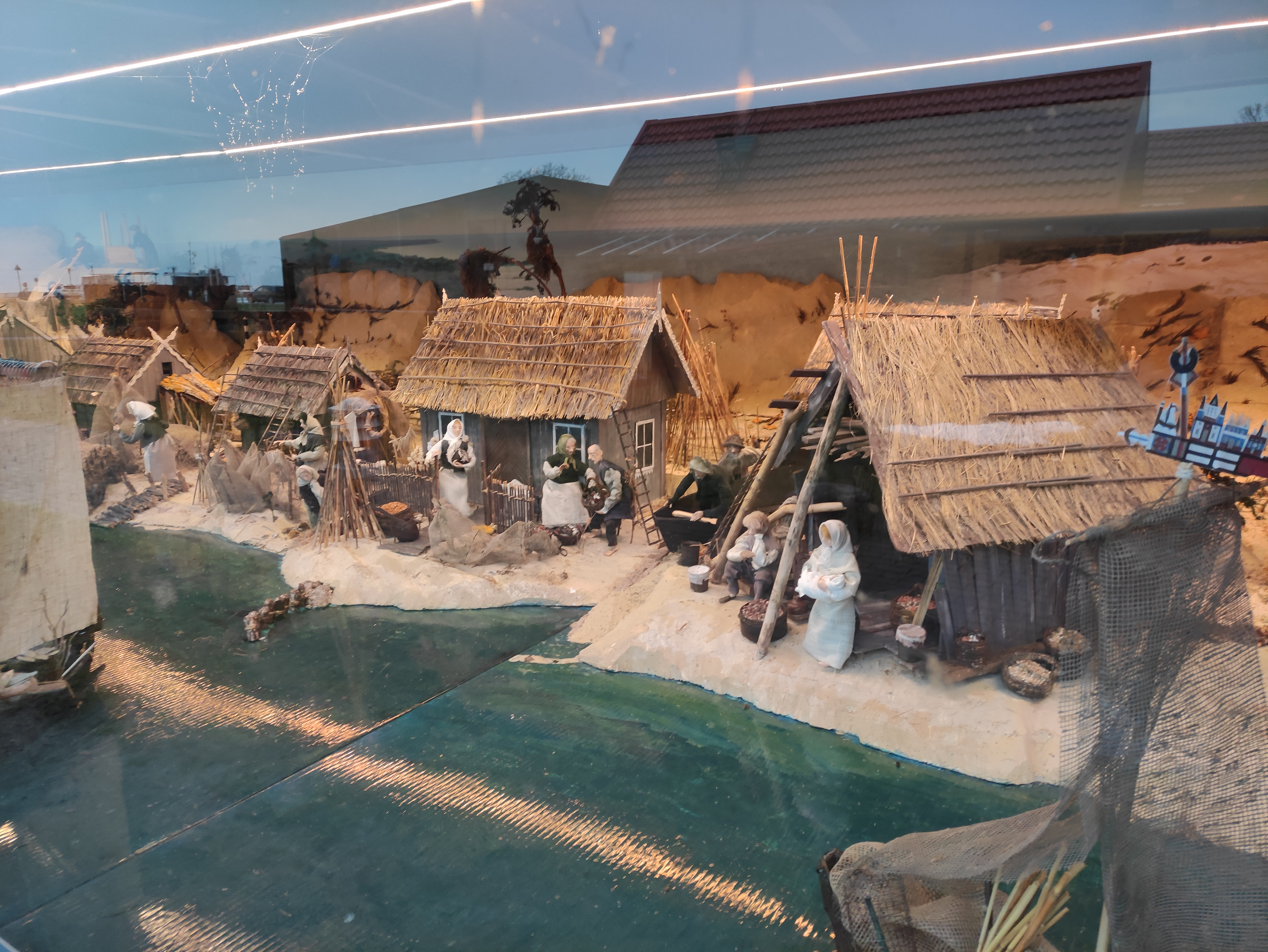
Exposition of ancient life in Nida

A settlement area of the Baltic Curonians, the original place called nida ("fluent" in the Old Prussian language) was first mentioned in 1385 documents issued by the Teutonic Knights, who ruled the lands within their Monastic State. The original settlement on the road along the Curonian Spit from Königsberg to Memel was located about 5 km (3.1 mi) south of its today's position near the Hohe Düne (High Dune) at Cape Grobštas (from Old Prussian: grabis, "hill"). In 1454, King Casimir IV Jagiellon incorporated the region to the Kingdom of Poland upon the request of the anti-Teutonic Prussian Confederation. After the subsequent Thirteen Years' War (1454–1466), the fishing village became a part of Poland as a fief held by the Teutonic Knights until 1525, and by Ducal Prussia afterwards, and thus was located within the Polish–Lithuanian union and Commonwealth.

From 1701, it was part of the Kingdom of Prussia. In 1709 nearly all of the population died from a bubonic plague epidemic. Continuously threatened by sand drifts, the village was moved away from the approaching dune to today's position in the 1730s. Incorporated into the Prussian Province of East Prussia in 1773, it became part of the German Empire upon the German unification of 1871. In 1874 a lighthouse on Urbas hill was built, later destroyed in the war and rebuilt in 1945 and 1953. In 1878, the village had a population of 655, mostly living off fishing, with fish being sold mainly to nearby Klaipėda and other coastal settlements. Nida already was the largest village of the Curonian Spit. Both Lithuanian and German-language church services were held there.

=== Artists' colony ===
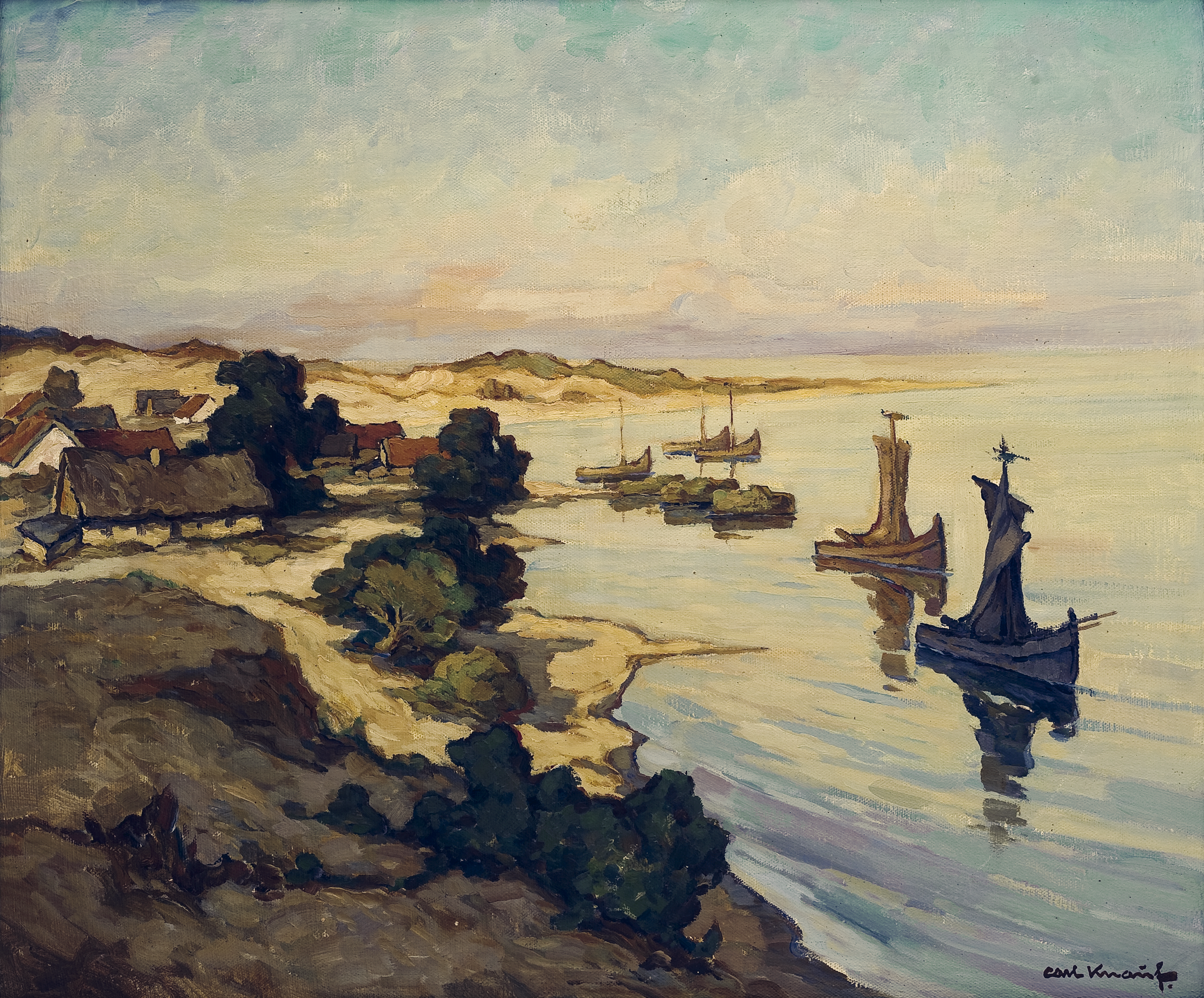
"A view to Purvynė Pier" (circa 1938, by Carl Knauf) nicknamed by contemporaries as the "Italian view"

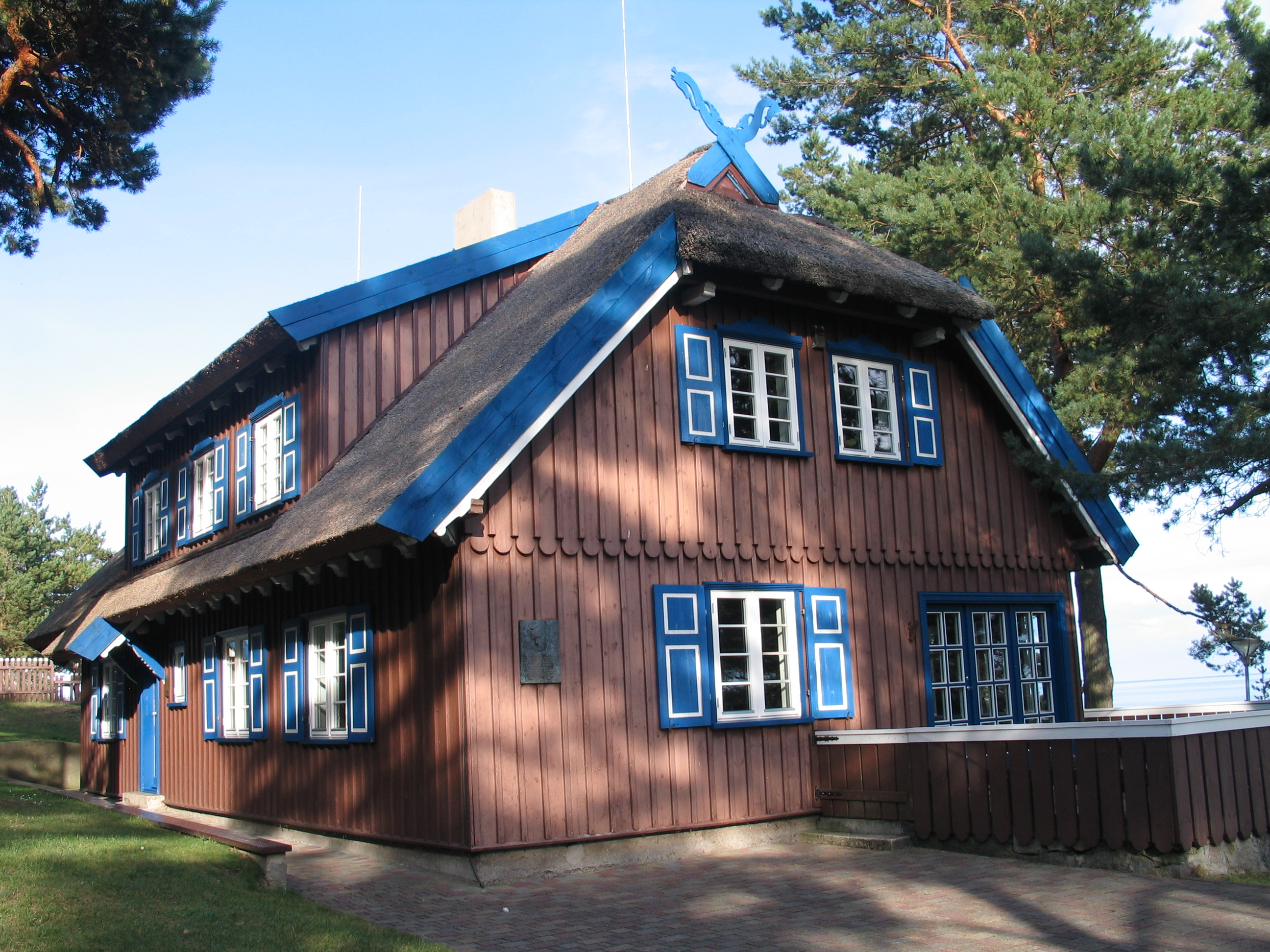
Thomas Mann's summer house, now a museum

From the late 19th century, the dune landscape became popular with landscape and animal painters from the Kunstakademie Königsberg arts school. The local inn of Herman Blode was the nucleus of the expressionist artists' colony (Künstlerkolonie Nidden). Lovis Corinth sojourned there, as did Max Pechstein, Alfred Lichtwark, Karl Schmidt-Rottluff, and Alfred Partikel. Painters from Königsberg such as Julius Freymuth and Eduard Bischoff visited the area, as did poets such as Ernst Wiechert and Carl Zuckmayer. Other guests included Ernst Kirchner, Ernst Mollenhauer, Franz Domscheit, and Hermann Wirth. The painters usually took accommodations at Blode's hotel, and left some of their works with him. Some also built their own residences in the vicinity.

After World War I Nidden, together with the northern half of the Curonian Spit, became part of the Klaipėda Region under the 1919 Treaty of Versailles, but was subsequently incorporated to Lithuania in 1923. Renamed Nida, the village nevertheless remained a predominantly German settlement; the border with the remaining German (East Prussian) half of the spit lay only a few kilometers to the south.

In 1929 Nobel Prize-winning writer Thomas Mann visited Nida while on holiday in nearby Rauschen and decided to have a summer house erected on a hill above the lagoon; it was mocked by locals as Uncle Tom's Cabin. He and his family spent the summers of 1930–32 in the cottage, and parts of the epic novel Joseph and His Brothers were written there.

Threatened by the Nazis due to his political views, Mann left Germany after Hitler's Machtergreifung in 1933 and eventually emigrated to the United States. After the Klaipėda Region was again annexed by (now Nazified) Germany in 1939, his house was seized at the behest of Hermann Göring and designated a recreation home for Luftwaffe officers.

=== Post-war ===
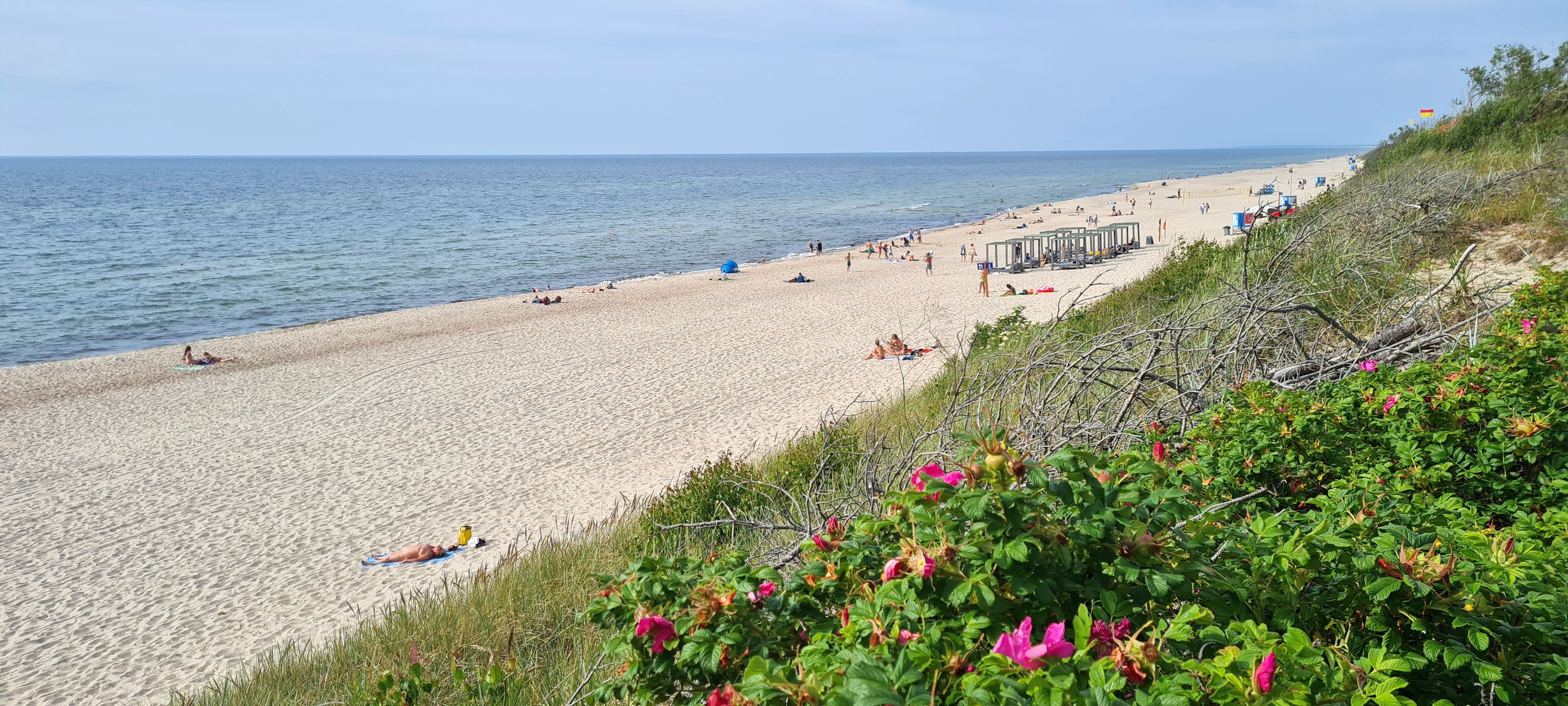
Beach and dunes near Nida in 2023

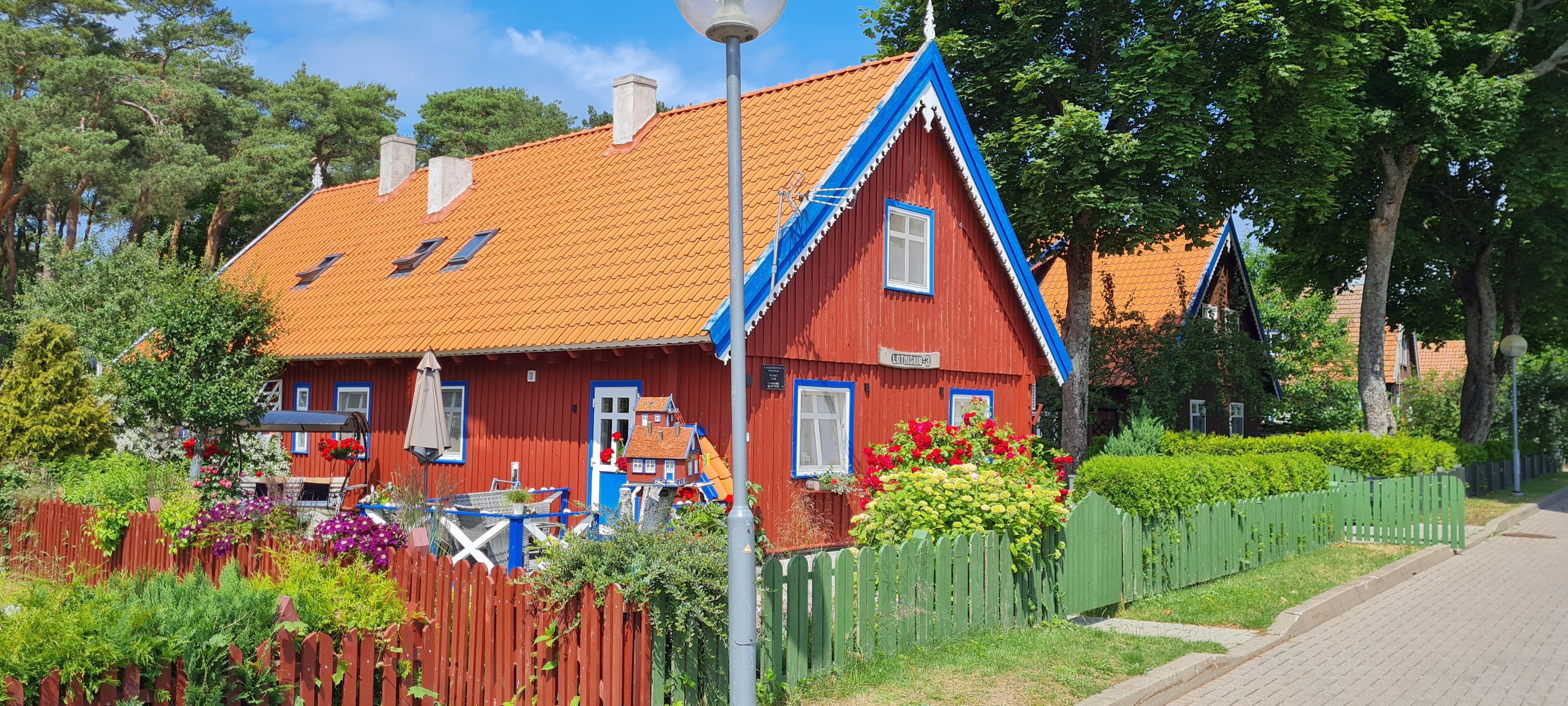
Traditional homesteads in 2023

In 1939 the town had 736 inhabitants. Like all of the Curonian Spit, Nida became nearly uninhabited as a result of the advancing Red Army, the Evacuation of East Prussia and the eventual expulsion of surviving German inhabitants. After the end of World War II, Nida again became part of then Soviet-occupied Lithuania. In the early postwar period, Nida was a little-visited fishing village. Later during the Soviet occupation, together with three other villages of the Neringa Municipality (Juodkrantė, Preila and Pervalka), Nida was a controlled-entry holiday resort reserved for the Communist party officials and elite (nomenklatura).

Since Lithuania restored its independence in 1990, the area has been open to all and the tourism has flourished. However, as Curonian Spit is a national park and a UNESCO World Heritage Site, there are various restrictions to protect its ecosystem and the unique architecture of settlements like Nida.

Mann's summer cottage survived the war and was preserved on the initiative of the Lithuanian poet Antanas Venclova. A first memorial site was inaugurated already in 1967. During the Soviet occupation, it hosted a library open in summer only, with residential quarters of the visiting librarian posted from Klaipėda upstairs and public areas downstairs. In 1995/96 the house was restored according to the original architectural design and reopenend as a cultural center dedicated to the writer, with a memorial exhibition and an annual festival.

== Climate ==
Klaipėda's climate is considered to be humid continental, (Köppen Dfb), although it borders quite closely to oceanic, (Köppen Cfb), when using the -3 °C isotherm, because of the proximity to the Baltic Sea, which is less prone to extreme weather events than the climate inland.

Climate data for Nida, Lithuania (1991-2020 normals, extremes 1961-1990)
Month	Jan	Feb	Mar	Apr	May	Jun	Jul	Aug	Sep	Oct	Nov	Dec	Year
Record high °C (°F)	10.5 (50.9)	12.9 (55.2)	20.5 (68.9)	26.2 (79.2)	29.4 (84.9)	32.0 (89.6)	32.8 (91.0)	31.2 (88.2)	27.8 (82.0)	20.6 (69.1)	14.1 (57.4)	10.9 (51.6)	32.8 (91.0)
Mean daily maximum °C (°F)	1.2 (34.2)	1.4 (34.5)	4.5 (40.1)	10.7 (51.3)	16.2 (61.2)	19.5 (67.1)	22.2 (72.0)	22.2 (72.0)	17.6 (63.7)	11.5 (52.7)	6.3 (43.3)	3.0 (37.4)	11.4 (52.5)
Daily mean °C (°F)	−1.0 (30.2)	−1.0 (30.2)	1.7 (35.1)	6.9 (44.4)	12.2 (54.0)	16.0 (60.8)	18.9 (66.0)	19.0 (66.2)	14.8 (58.6)	9.2 (48.6)	4.4 (39.9)	0.9 (33.6)	8.5 (47.3)
Mean daily minimum °C (°F)	−3.2 (26.2)	−3.2 (26.2)	−0.7 (30.7)	4.0 (39.2)	9.0 (48.2)	13.0 (55.4)	16.2 (61.2)	16.3 (61.3)	12.3 (54.1)	7.2 (45.0)	2.7 (36.9)	−1.1 (30.0)	6.0 (42.9)
Record low °C (°F)	−30.2 (−22.4)	−31.2 (−24.2)	−22.0 (−7.6)	−5.9 (21.4)	−1.5 (29.3)	1.4 (34.5)	7.8 (46.0)	5.7 (42.3)	2.9 (37.2)	−5.5 (22.1)	−19.1 (−2.4)	−22.4 (−8.3)	−31.2 (−24.2)
Average precipitation mm (inches)	61 (2.4)	45 (1.8)	41 (1.6)	34 (1.3)	42 (1.7)	59 (2.3)	70 (2.8)	86 (3.4)	78 (3.1)	97 (3.8)	81 (3.2)	71 (2.8)	765 (30.2)
Average relative humidity (%)	86	86	82	77	75	76	76	76	78	82	87	87	81
Mean monthly sunshine hours	47.2	71.6	156.6	233.7	303.7	288.1	300.4	278.2	197.2	117.5	47.4	34.8	2,076.4
Source 1: Lithuanian Hydrometeorological Service
Source 2: NOAA (extremes)

Coastal temperature data for Nida
Month	Jan	Feb	Mar	Apr	May	Jun	Jul	Aug	Sep	Oct	Nov	Dec	Year
Average sea temperature °C (°F)	3.2 (37.76)	2.4 (36.32)	1.6 (34.88)	4.2 (39.56)	9.6 (49.28)	15.0 (59.00)	18.5 (65.30)	19.2 (66.56)	17.0 (62.60)	12.6 (54.68)	9.1 (48.38)	5.8 (42.44)	9.9 (49.73)
Source 1: Seatemperature.org

== Tourism ==
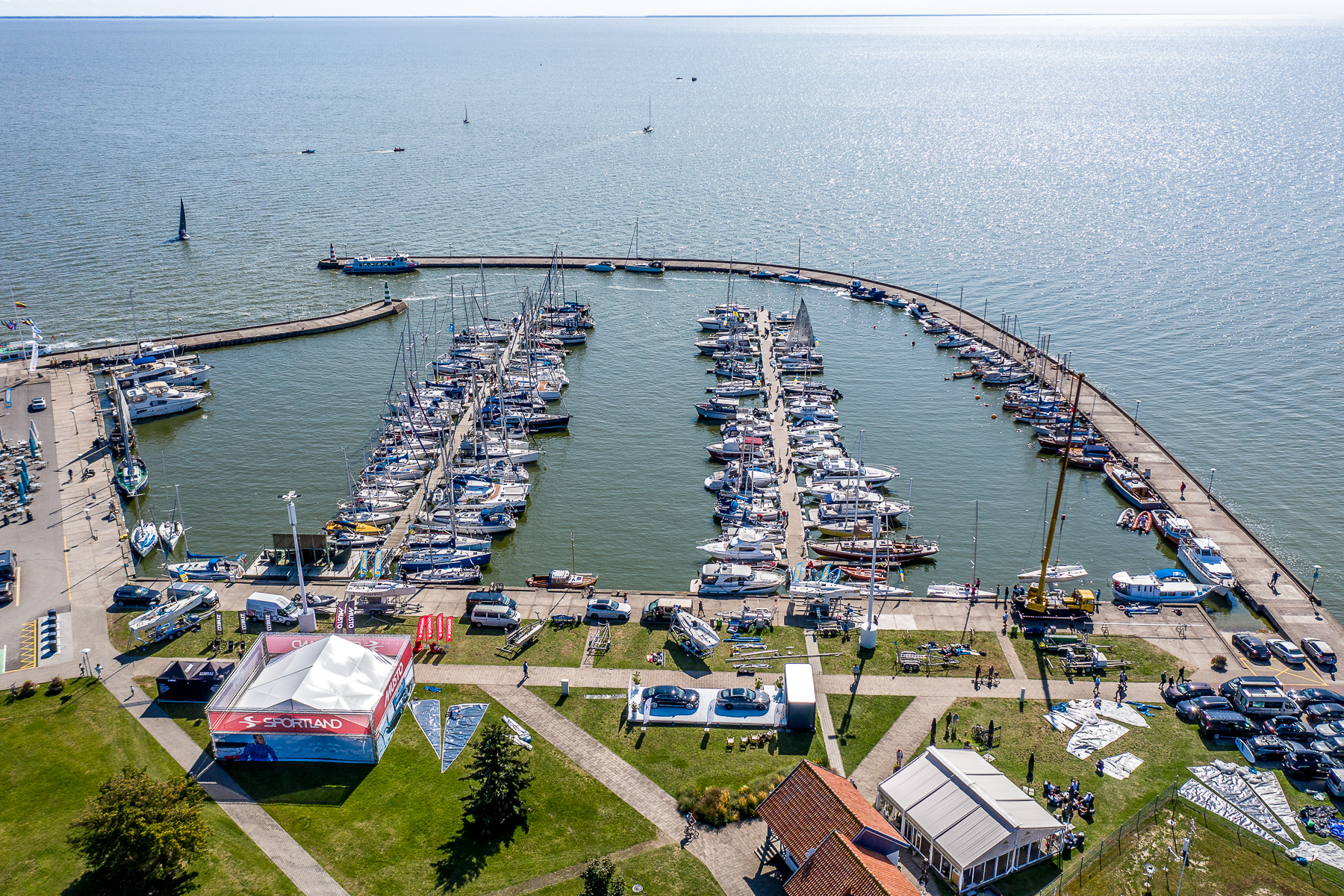
Port of Nida with yachts

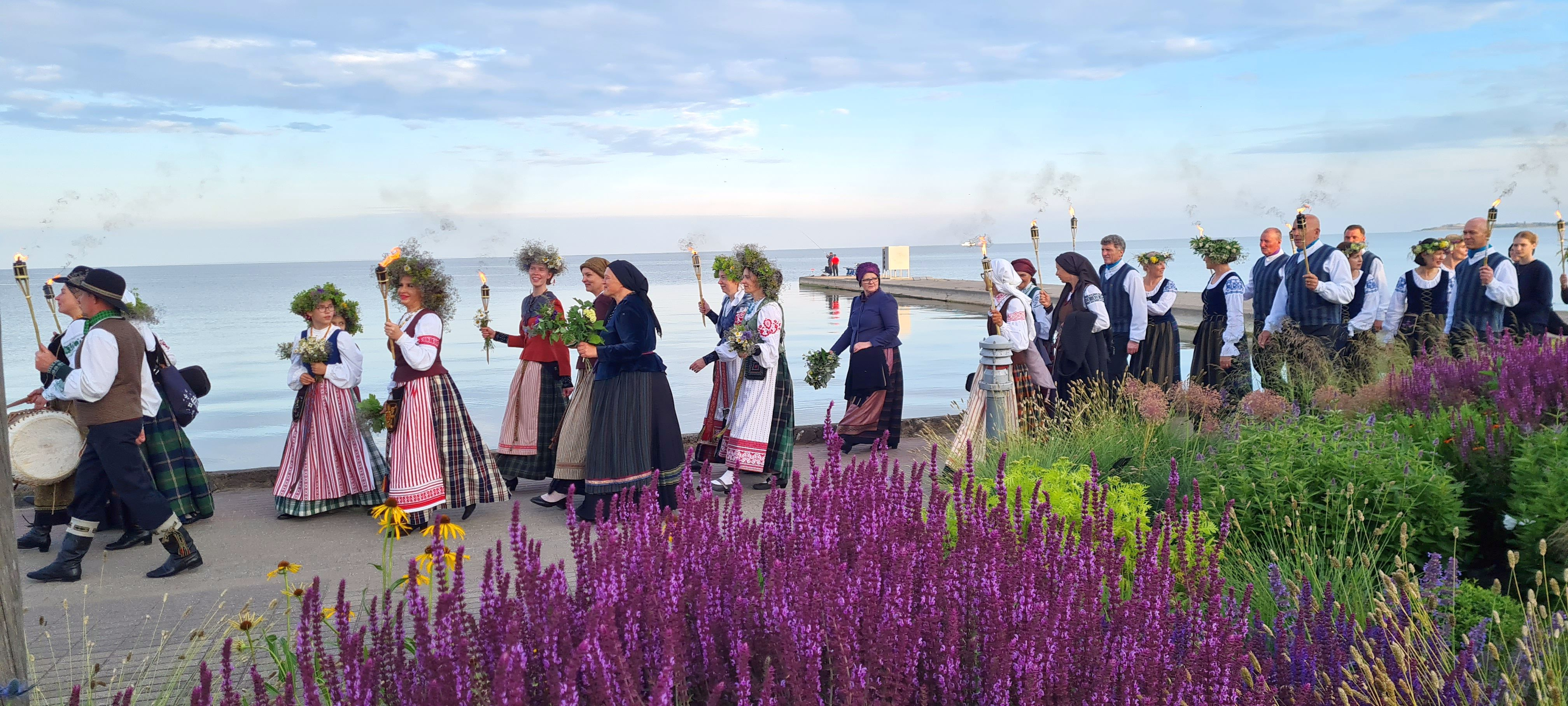
Saint Jonas's Festival in Nida

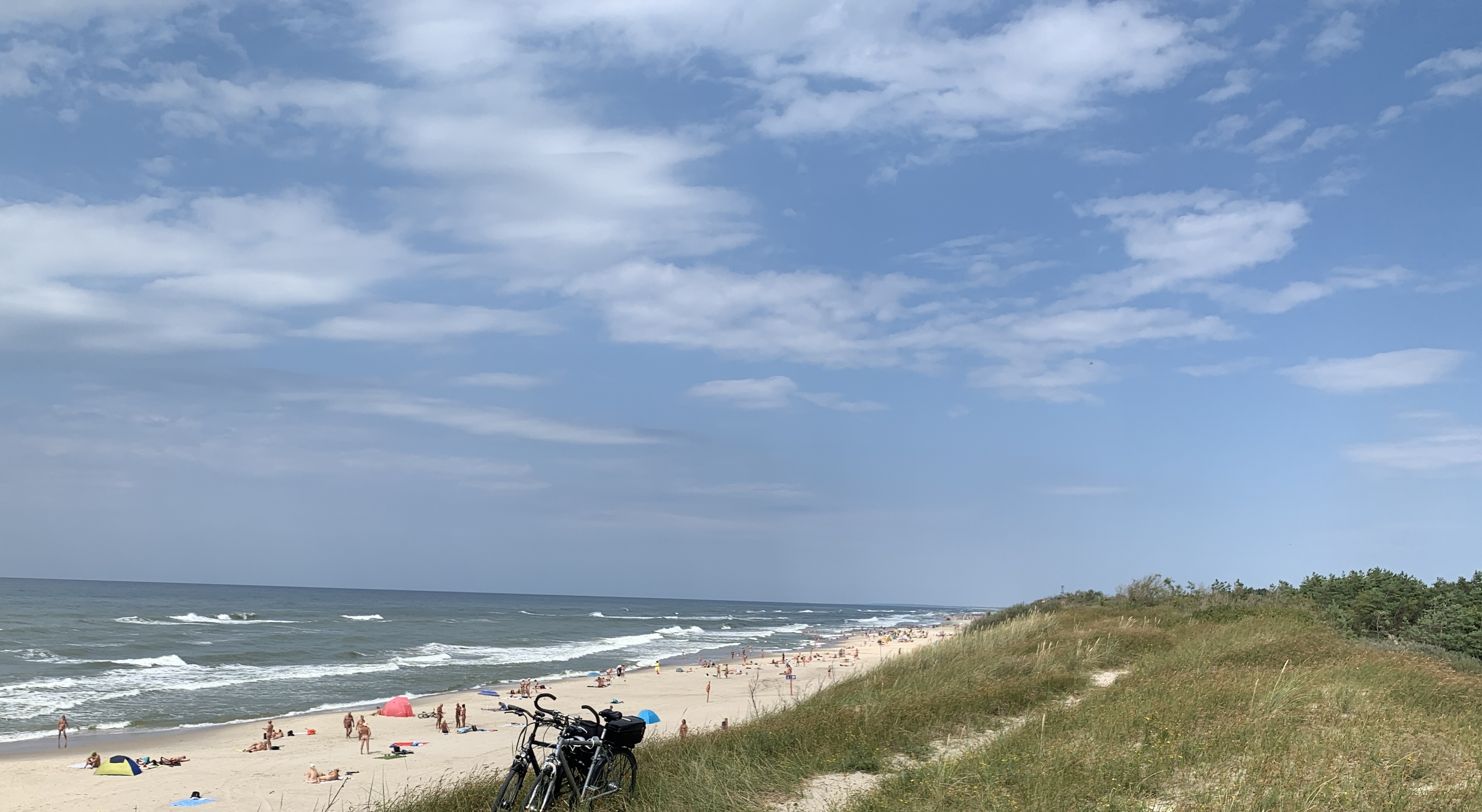
Nida's famous nudist beach

Since 2001, Nida Jazz Festival has been held every year. A local radio station Neringa FM streams live beats over FM and online. There are also interesting places to see nearby, including some of the highest sand dunes in Europe, a large sundial (which has been restored after being damaged by a Baltic gale), Fisherman's Ethnographic Homestead, gallery-museum of amber and a German Protestant (Evangelische) Brick Gothic church (built in 1888). There is also a campsite.

The settlement is known for Nidden Kurenwimpel — German for "Curonian pennants" — ornate carved flags particular to local families resident on the Curonian Spit. The flags, replicas of which can be seen around Nida, feature animal and human figures as pictograms reminiscent of a pagan writing tradition. At the local cemetery, examples of krikštas (pl. krikštai), pagan burial markers in place of tombstones, can still be seen.

Nida's beach participates in the Blue Flag Programme. Nudists make use of parts of the beach near Nida for nude bathing. Nida's nudist beach is frequently featured in various rankings of world's best nudist beaches.

== Transportation ==
Bus station in Nida

Nida Airport is located in the settlement, but it has no scheduled routes and only capable of handling small aircraft. Nida also has a seaport which is used for ferries and fishing boats.

The only road which runs along the whole length of the Curonian Spit, connecting Zelenogradsk and Smiltynė (where a ferry connection to Klaipėda exists), passes through the edge of Nida. An hourly bus runs between Nida and Smiltynė ferry terminal on that road, and intercity buses to various cities like Kaliningrad, Klaipėda, Kaunas and Vilnius exist.

== Notable people from Nida ==
- Tadas Sedekerskis (born 1998), Lithuanian basketball player

== Gallery ==
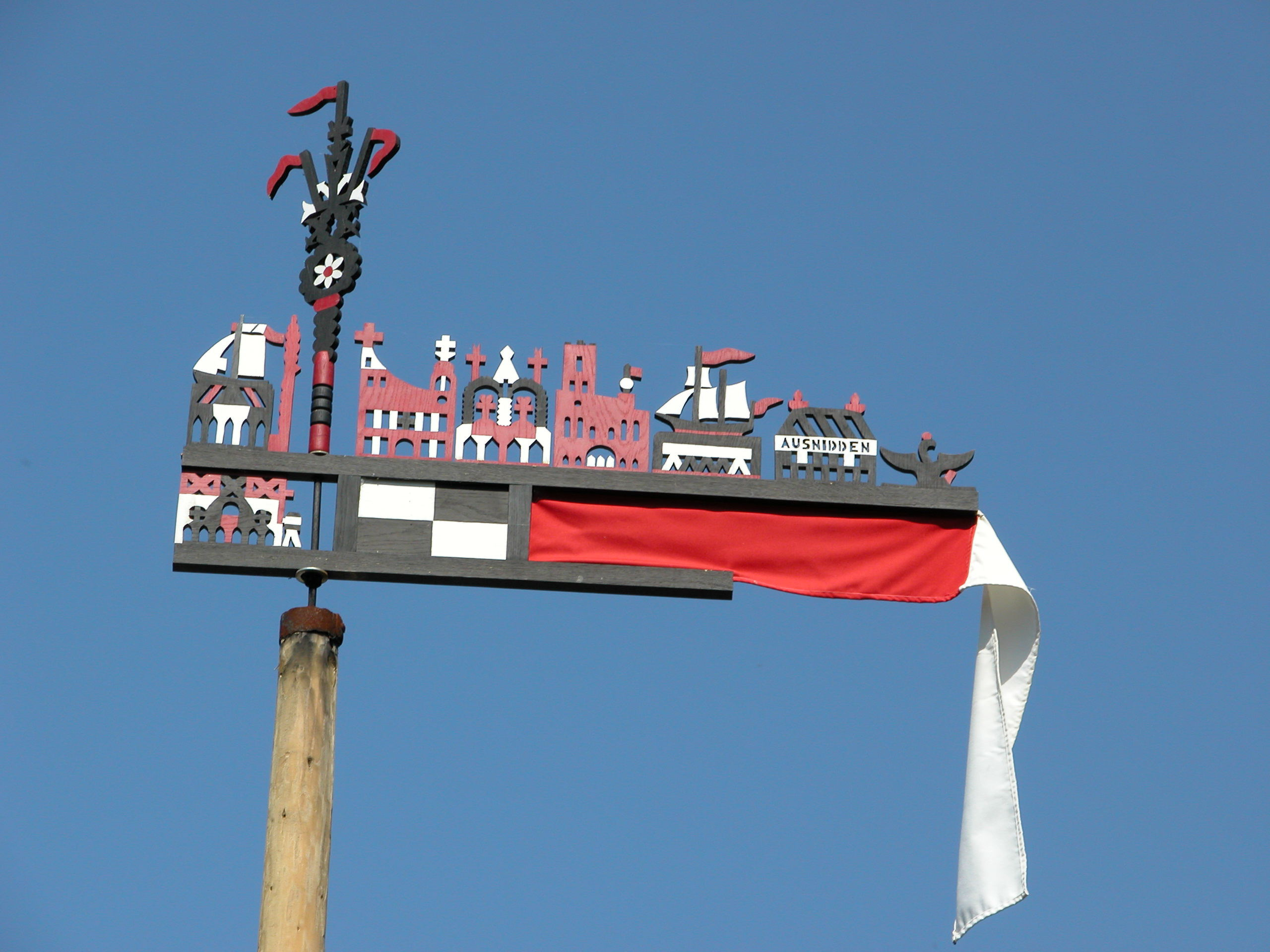
Kursenieki flag

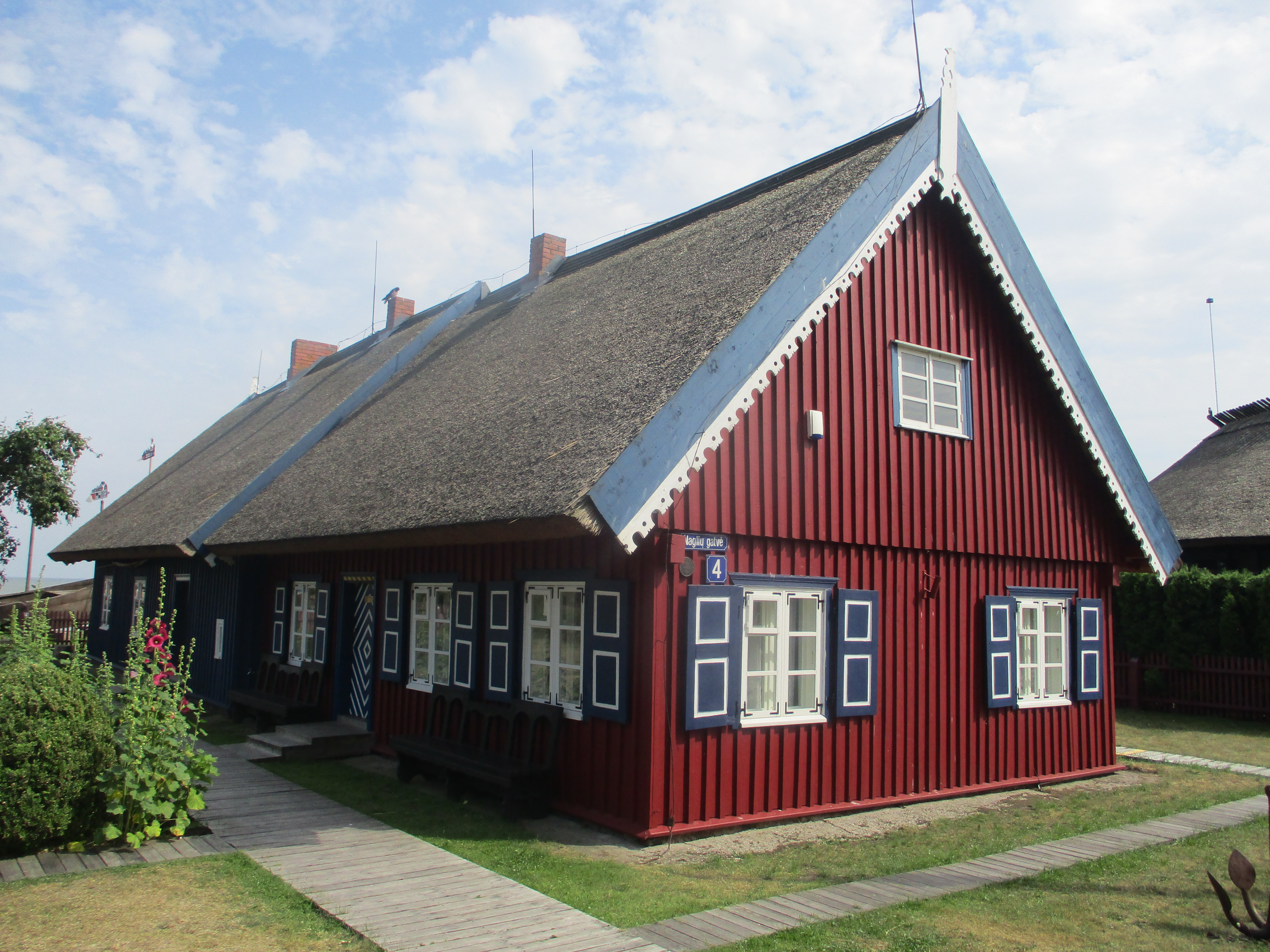
Fisherman's Ethnographic Homestead

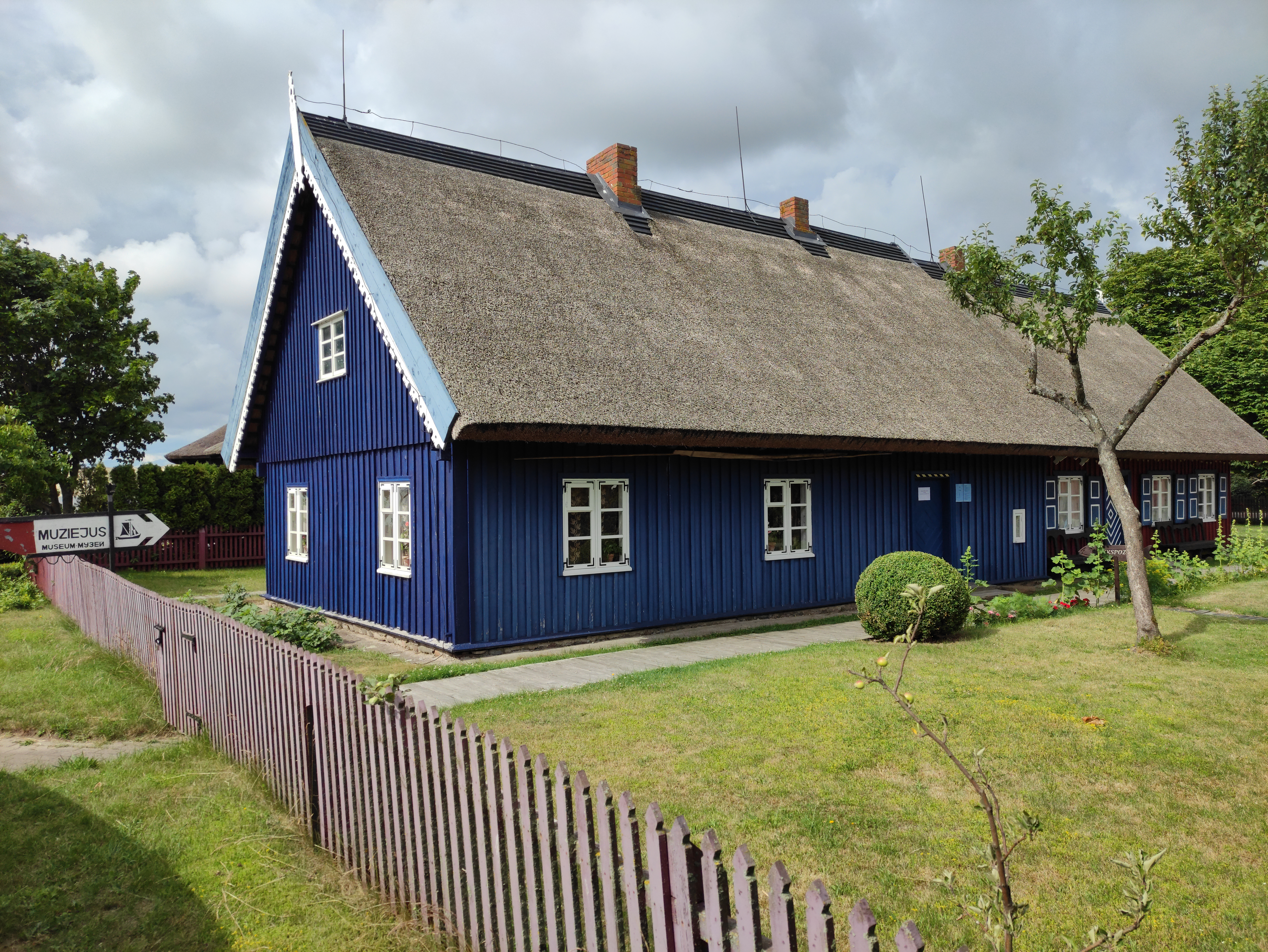
Ethnographic house

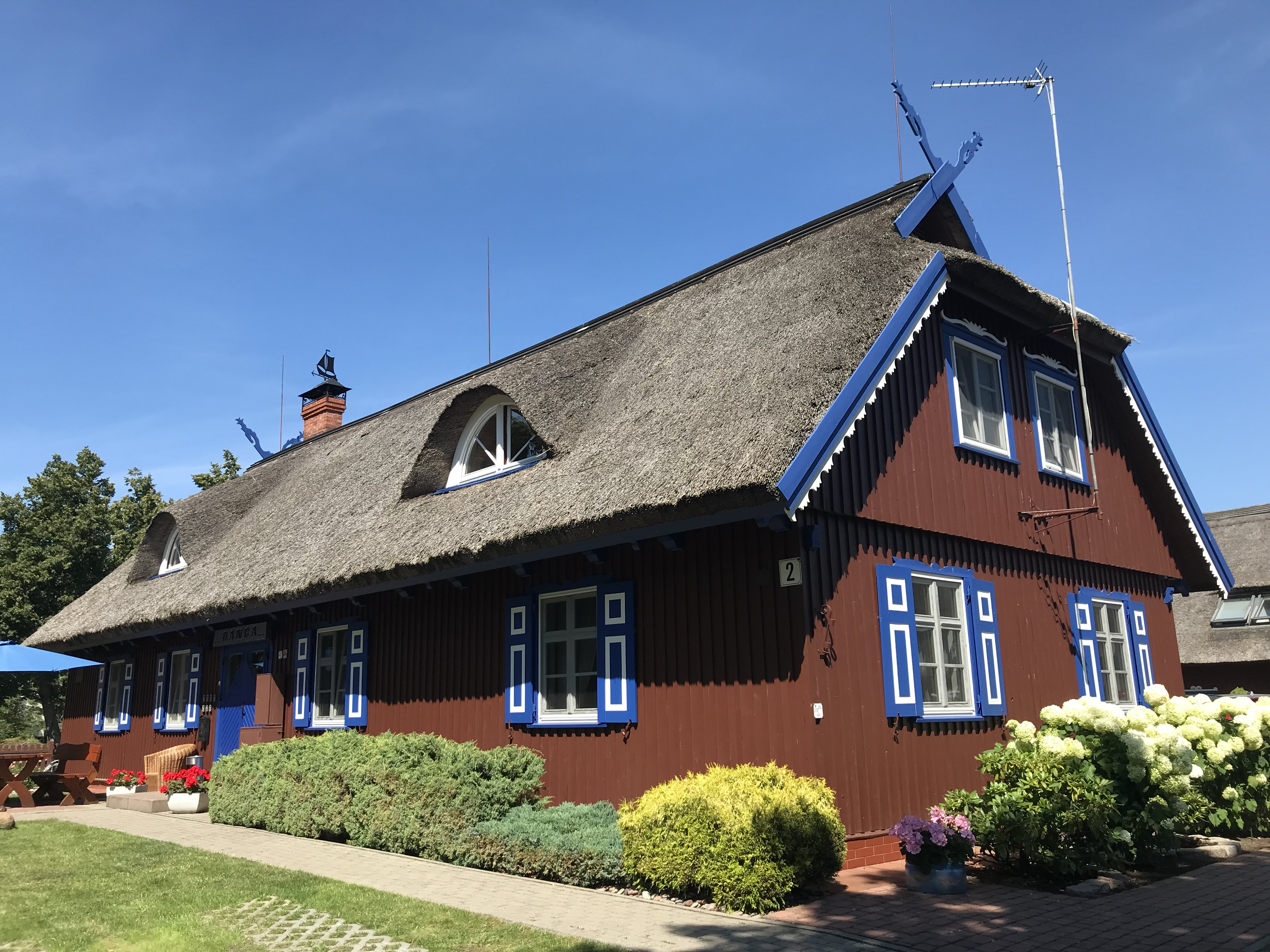
Kursenieki house

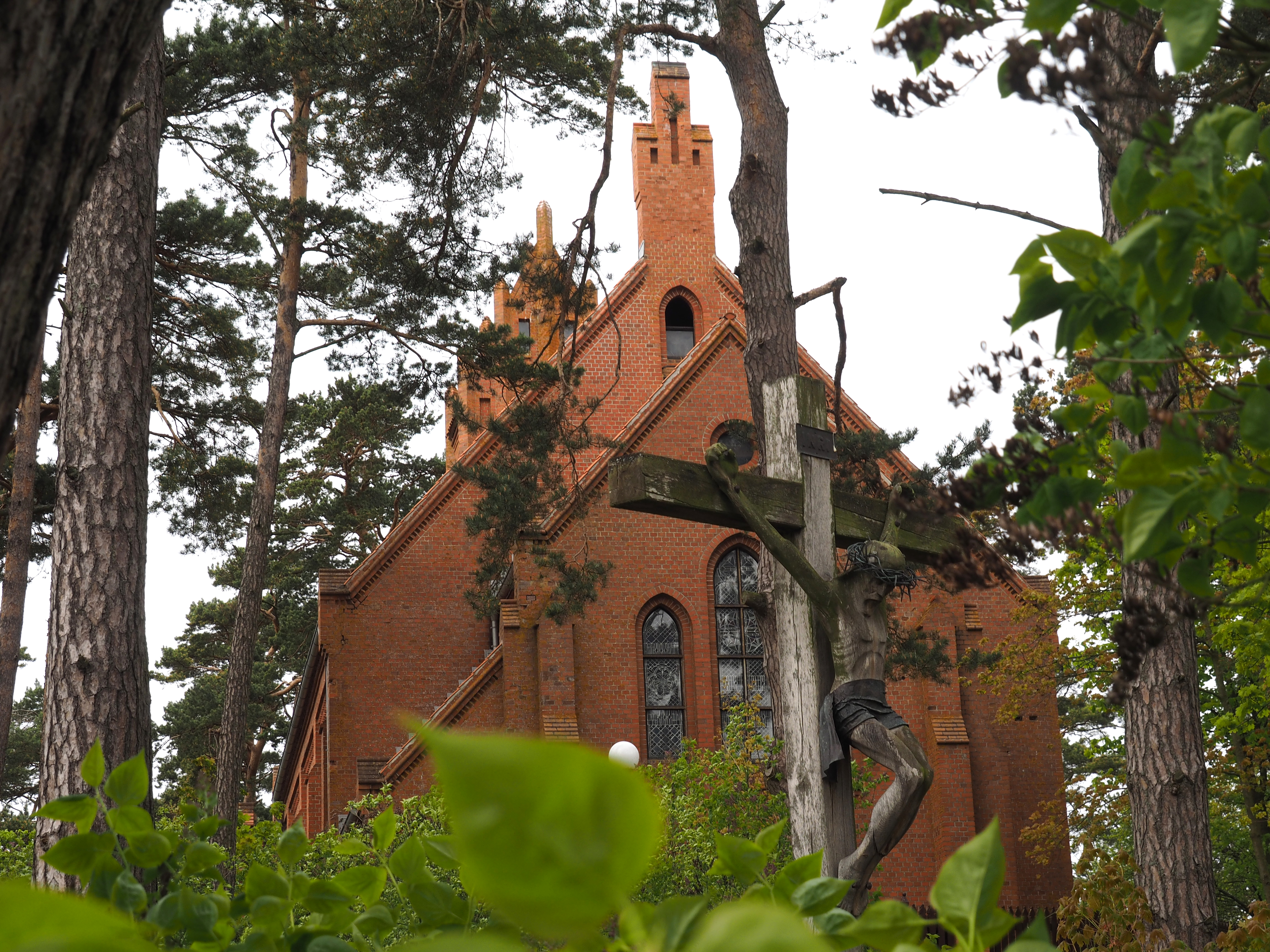
Lutheran Church (built in 1888)

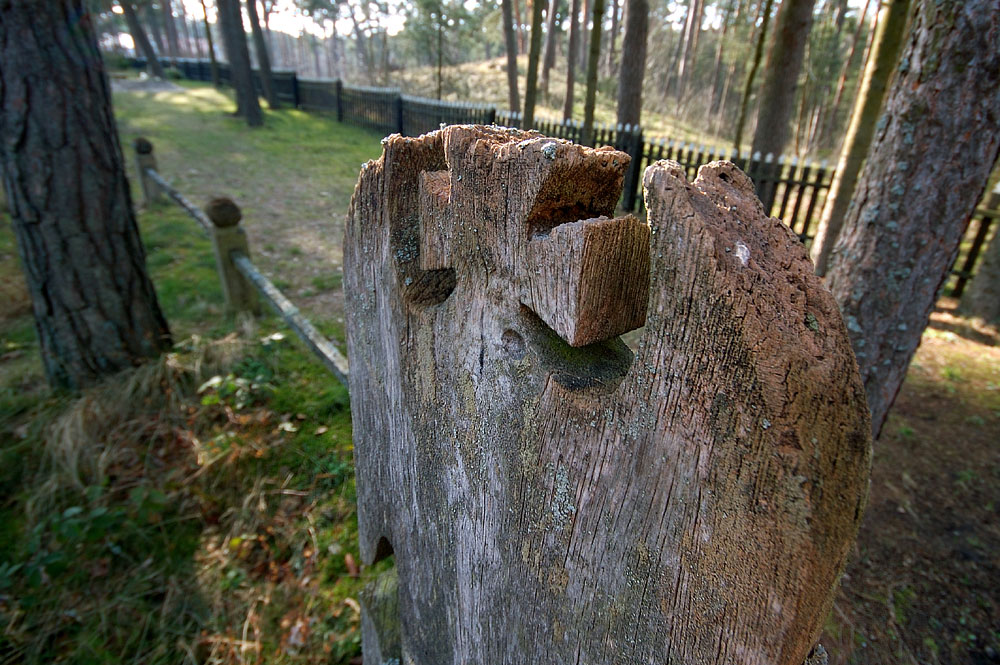
Krikštai (pagan burial markers) in the cemetery

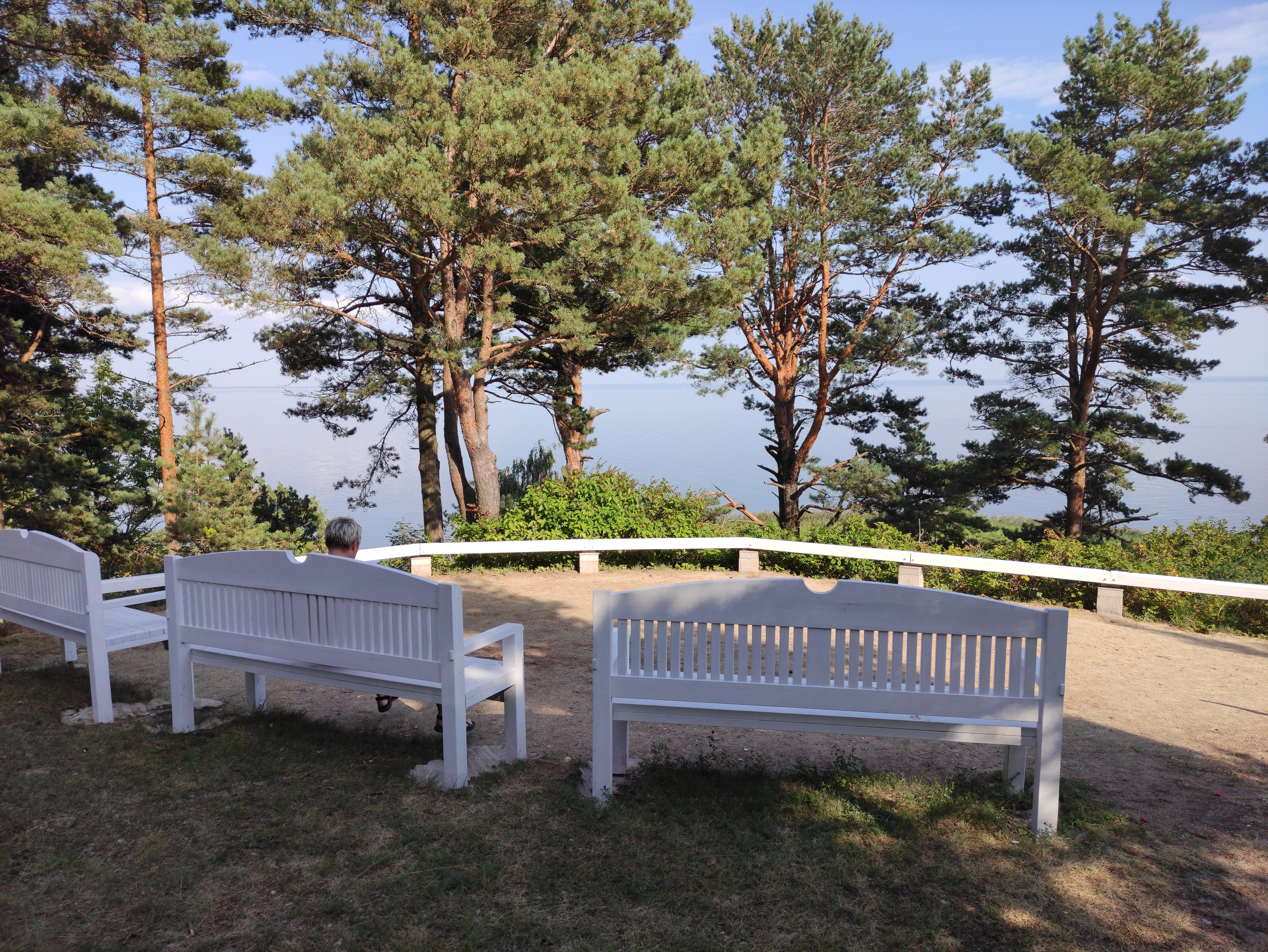
The "Italian view" in Skruzdinė

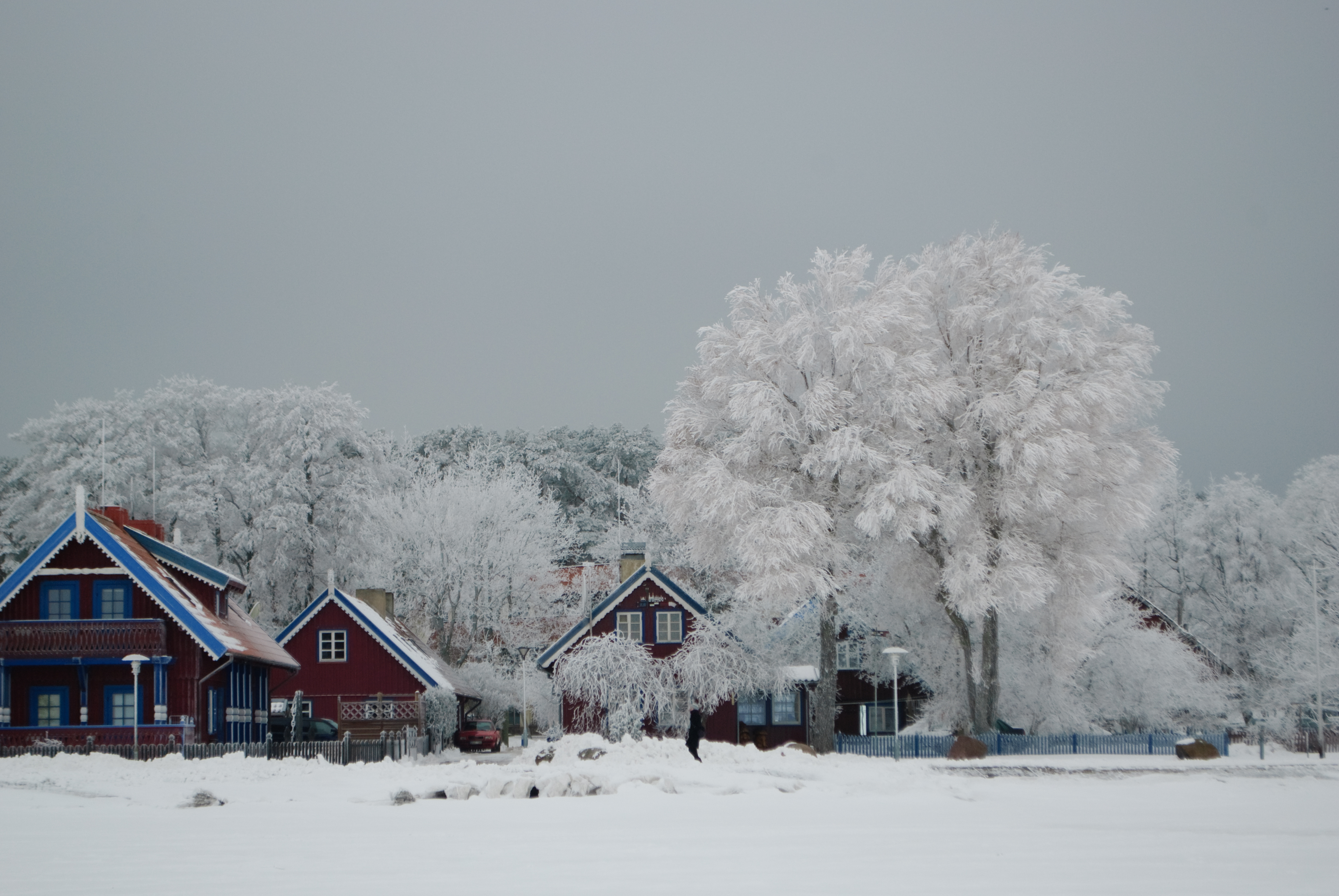
Nida in winter

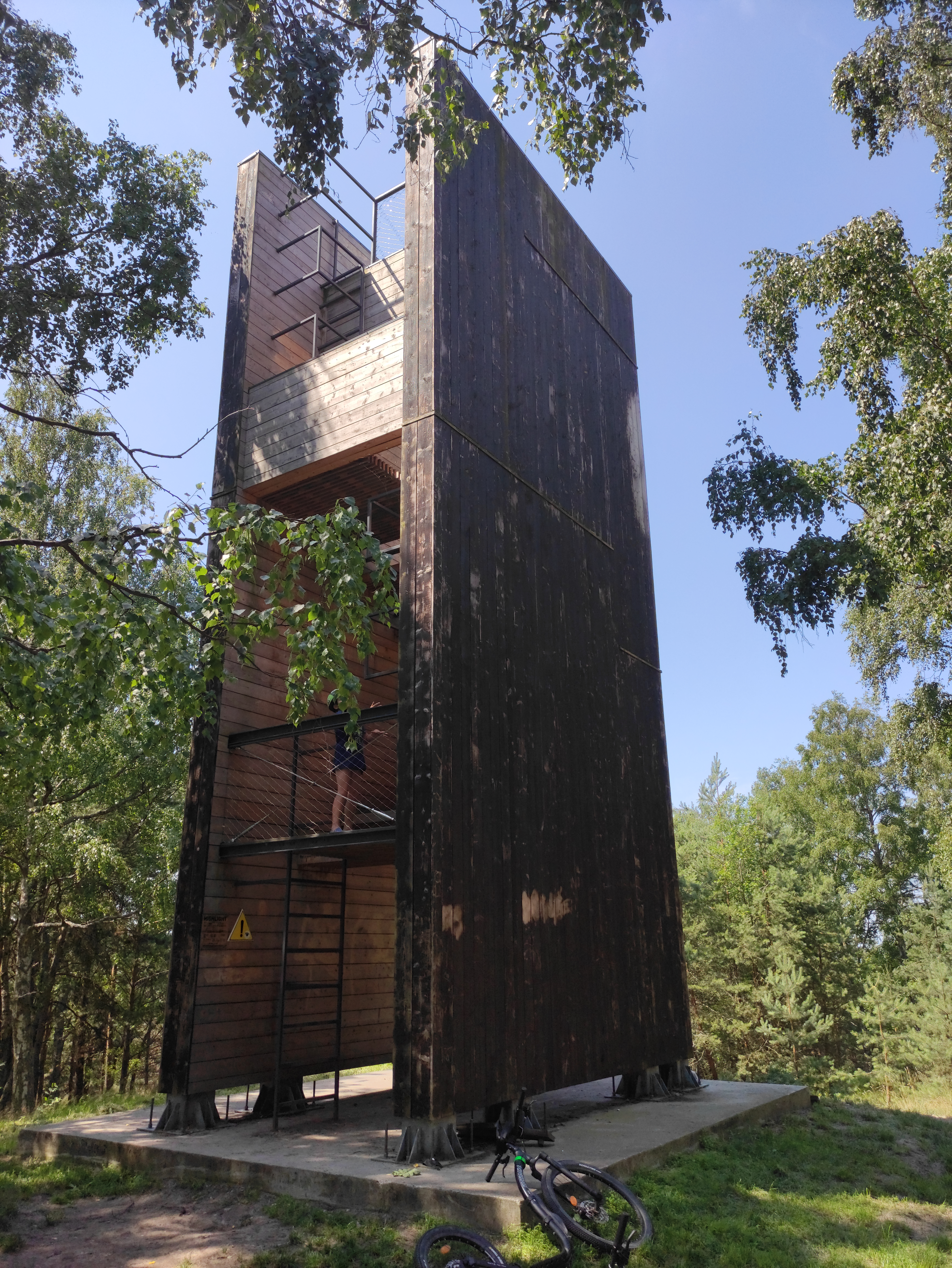
Observation tower

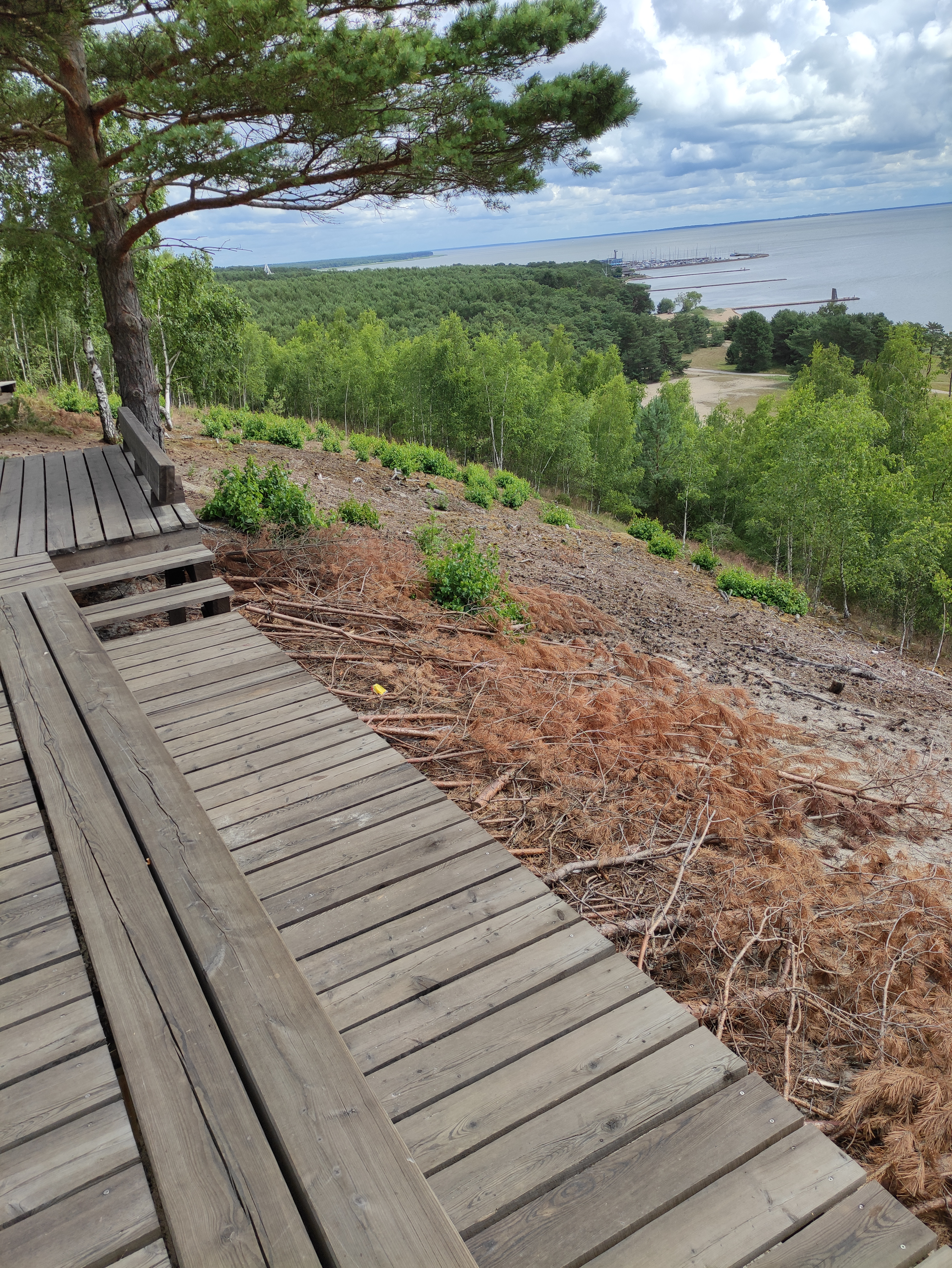
Parnidis Dune trek

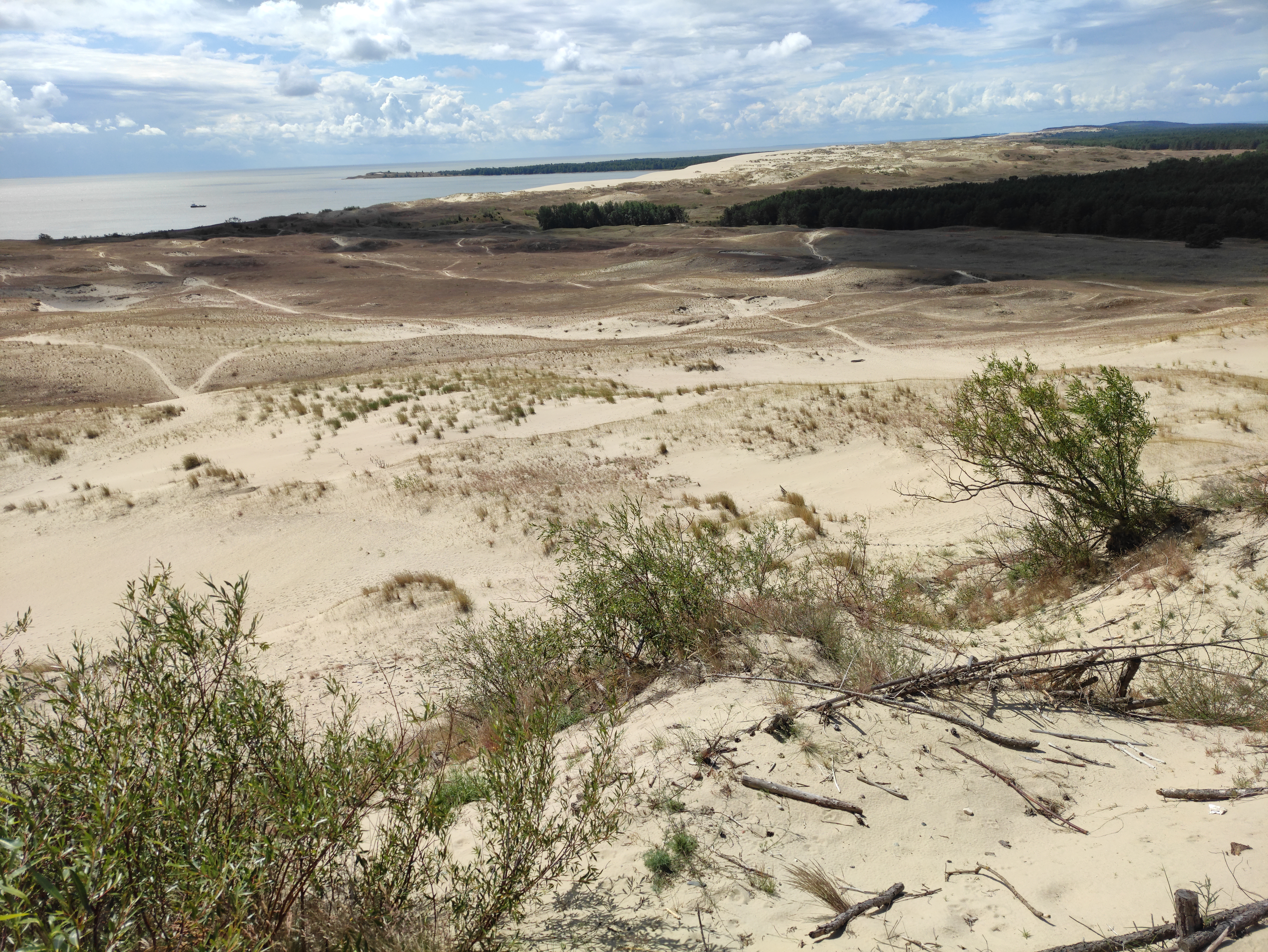
Parnidis Dune

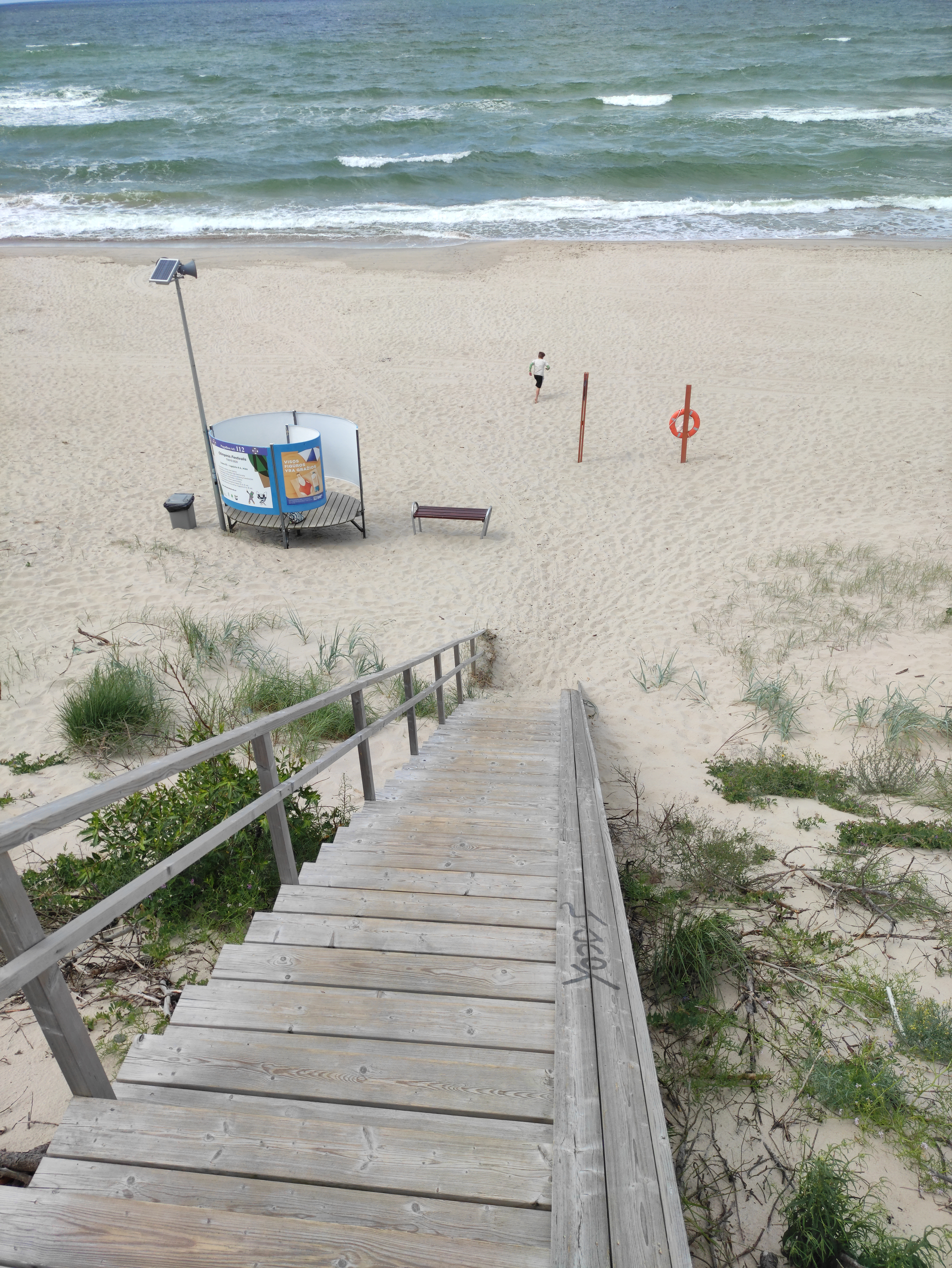
Nida beach

== See also ==
- Nida Lighthouse
