= Parnidis Dune =

Sand dune in Lithuania

Coordinates: 55.2949336°N 20.9906353°E

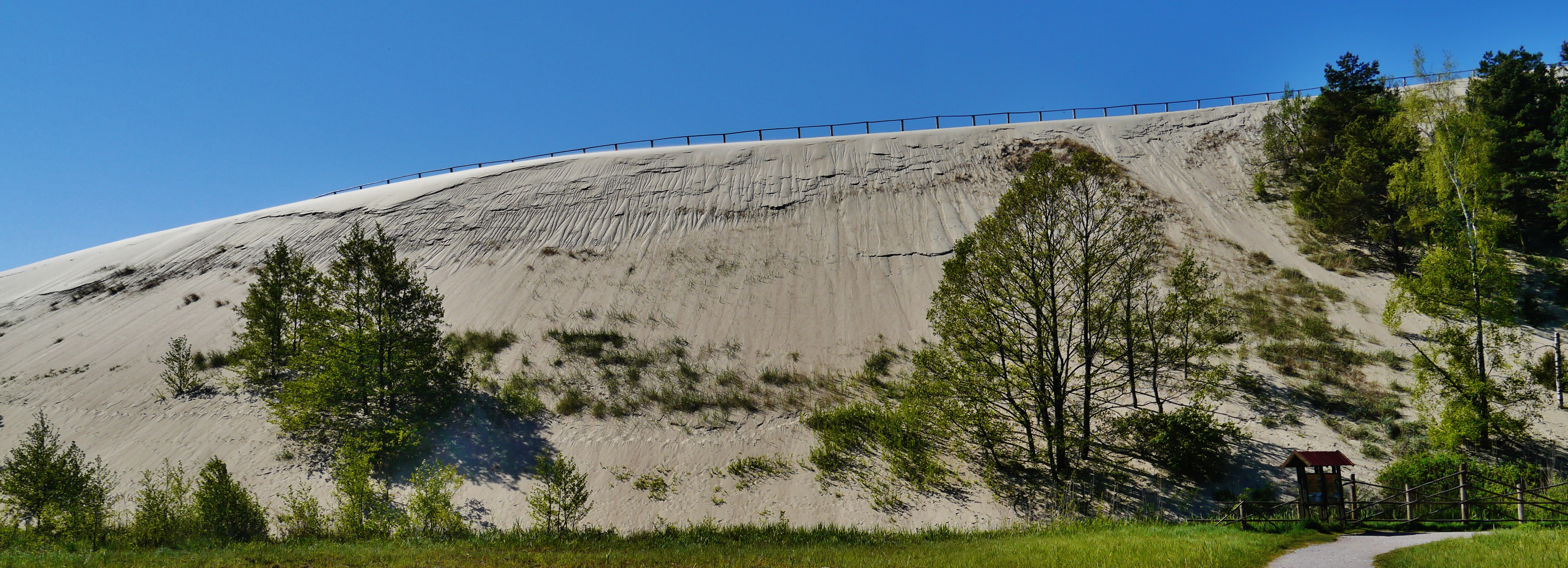
Parnidis Dune

The Parnidis Dune (Lithuanian: Parnidžio kopa) is a drifting (semi-permanent) coastal sand dune on the Curonian Spit, southeast of Nida, Lithuania, near the Lithuania-Russia border of the spit. It is almost entirely bare and reaches a height of 52 metres (171 ft) above sea level.

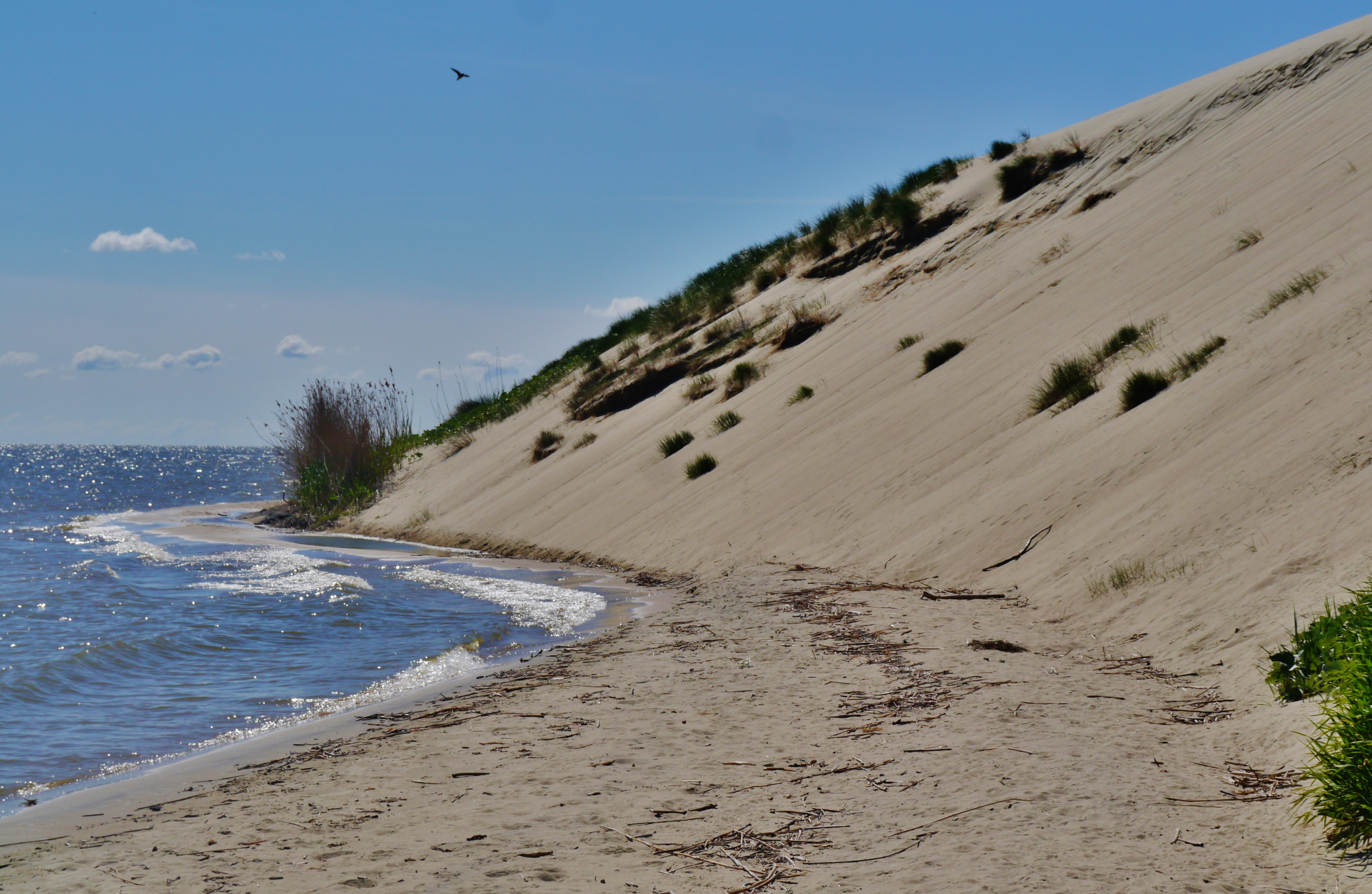
Parnidis Cape

Its height once reached a maximum of 60 metres, but decreased due to the dune's steady eastward movement and discharge of sand into the Curonian lagoon, prominently at the Parnidis Cape under the wind-induced saltation.

== Ecology ==
Parnidis Landscape Reserve was created around the dune within the Curonian Spit National Park to preserve a unique natural dune landscape, including bare and forested land, as well as the coastal areas of the dunes at both the Baltic Sea and the Curonian Lagoon. It is the only place with drifting dunes within the park.

The Parnidis dune is almost bare, but there are many patches of vegetative habitats, which are subject to degradation due to natural and anthropogenic reasons. For example, the sand blown from the peaks of the dune slides down the slope and destroys the vegetation. The same effect occurs from rain washouts. Artificial sources of degradation include people climbing the dune in non-prescribed places, which disturbs the sand.

== Tourism ==
The Parnidis Dune is one of the main tourist attractions of the Curonian Spit National Park. A scenic viewpoint, the Parnidis Dune Observation Deck, was constructed at the highest location on the dune, from which both the sea and the lagoon are visible.

Due to the fragility of the moving sand, paths were constructed for visitors to follow, and walking is prohibited in certain areas.

As of 2016, experts estimated the allowable recreational limit to be 25 dune visitors per square meter in half a day.

=== Sundial ===
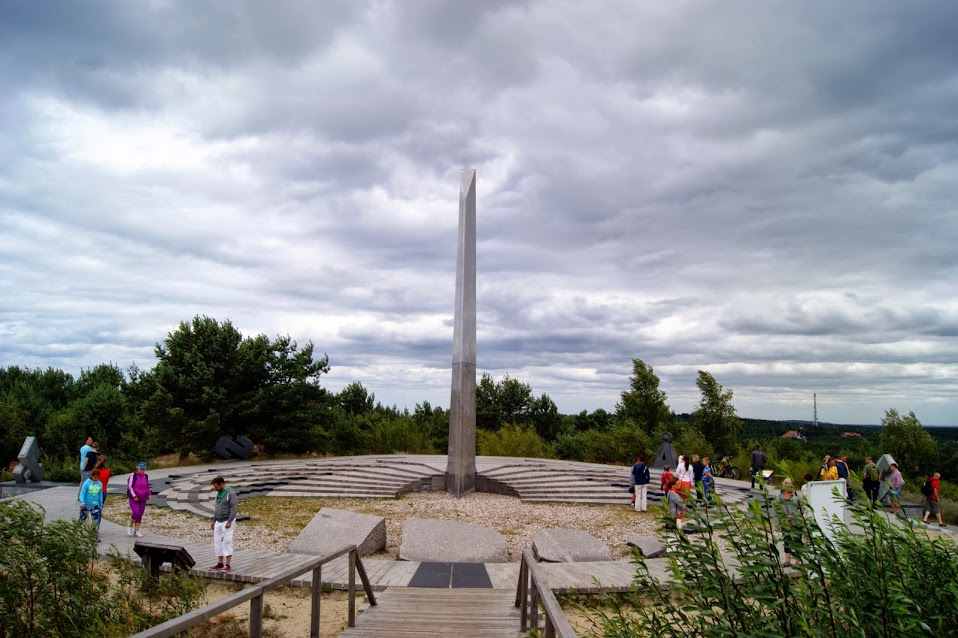
Parnidis sundial

Near the observation deck is a large granite sundial built in 1995 on the top of the dune. The sundial's gnomon is a stone pillar 13.8 metres (45 ft) high. It also includes small steps covered with granite slabs, carved with hour and half-hour notches, as well as one notch for each month, and four additional notches for solstices and equinoxes. The sundial was rebuilt in 2011 following storm damage, which broke the gnomon. The place where the gnomon was broken is clearly seen after its reconstruction.
