= Curonian Spit National Park (Lithuania) =

National park in Lithuania

- IUCN category II (national park)
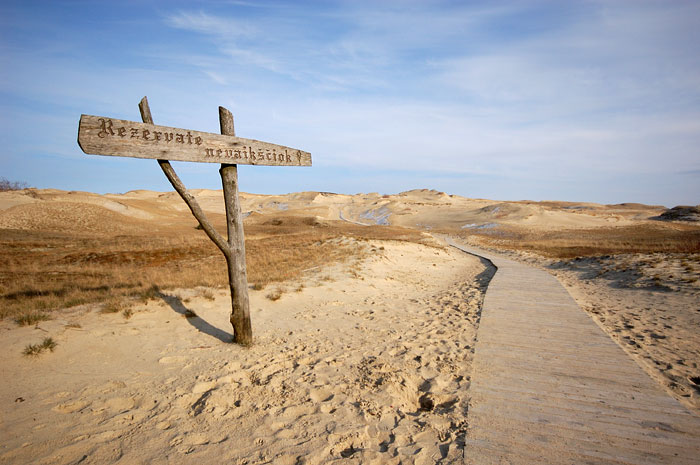
- Sand dunes in Curonian Spit National Park

- Location within Lithuania
- Interactive map of Curonian Spit National Park
- Location: Lithuania
- Nearest city: Neringa
- Coordinates: 55.481°N 21.097°E
- Area: 273.89 km^{2} (105.75 sq mi)
- Established: 1991
- Visitors: 0.4 million (in 2011)

Curonian Spit National Park (Lithuanian: Kuršių nerijos nacionalinis parkas) is one of the five national parks in Lithuania. It was established in 1991 to protect the unique ecosystems of the Curonian Spit and Curonian Lagoon.

Curonian Spit National Park is protected by the state, under the Lithuanian law of Protected Areas. Since 1997, it is a member of EUROPARC Federation. The park has Category II in the classification of the IUCN.

== Nagliai nature reserve ==
Nagliai nature reserve protects the Dead dunes. Dead (Mirusios) or Gray (Pilkosios) dunes are large sand hills built by strong winds, with ravines and erosions. Nagliai nature reserve offers habitat for rare plants, included in the Red Book, four villages and two old cemetery sites that are hiding under the sand. Any human activity is prohibited in the reserve except for scientific observations. The cognitive trail of Nagliai is the only place from which the reserve's objects can be explored.

From 1675 to 1854, four Nagliai villages here were covered in sand.

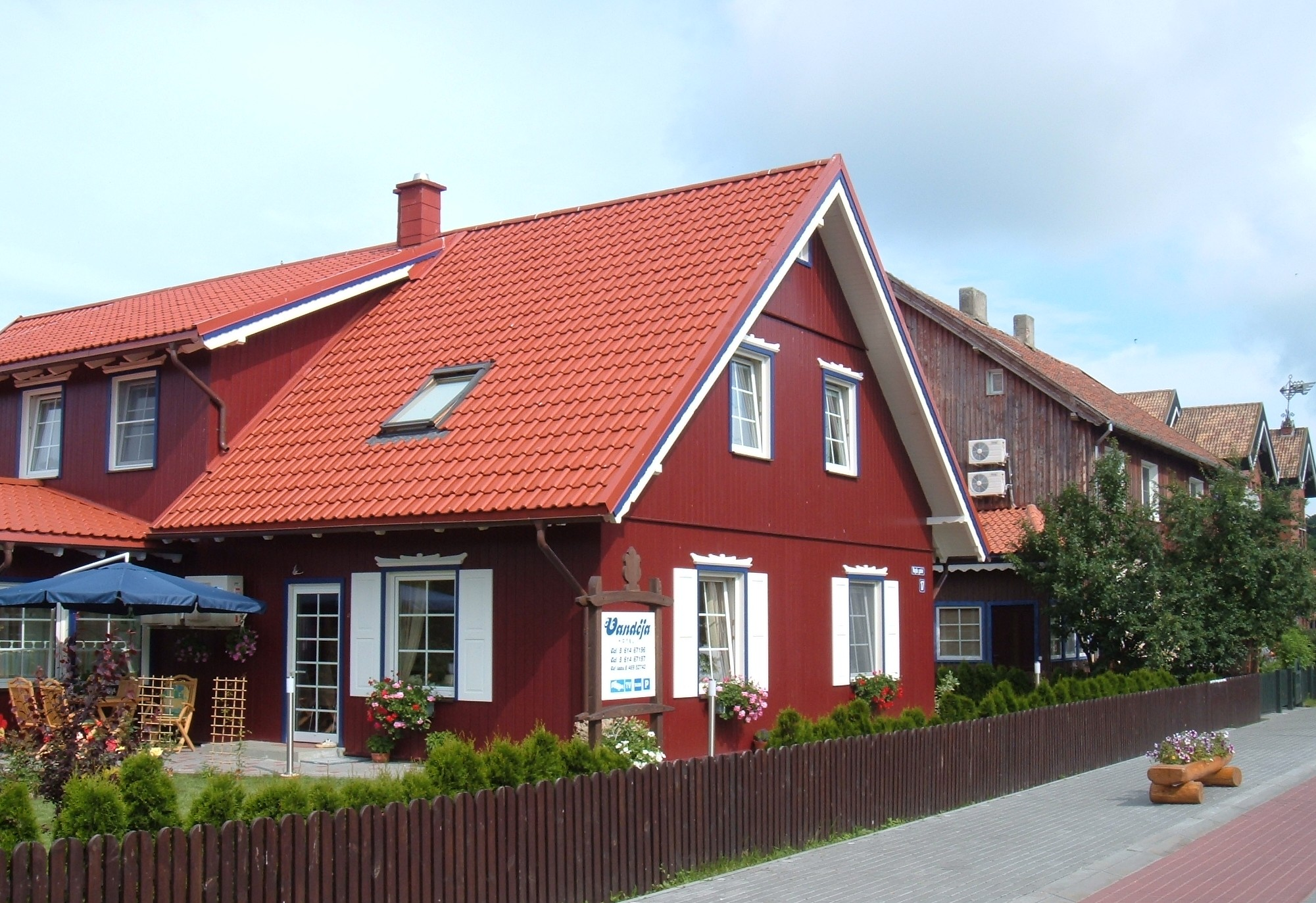
Red house in Nida

== See also ==
- Parnidis Dune
- Sound Catcher
- List of national parks in the Baltics
- Curonian Spit National Park (Russia)
