= List of social nudity places in Europe =

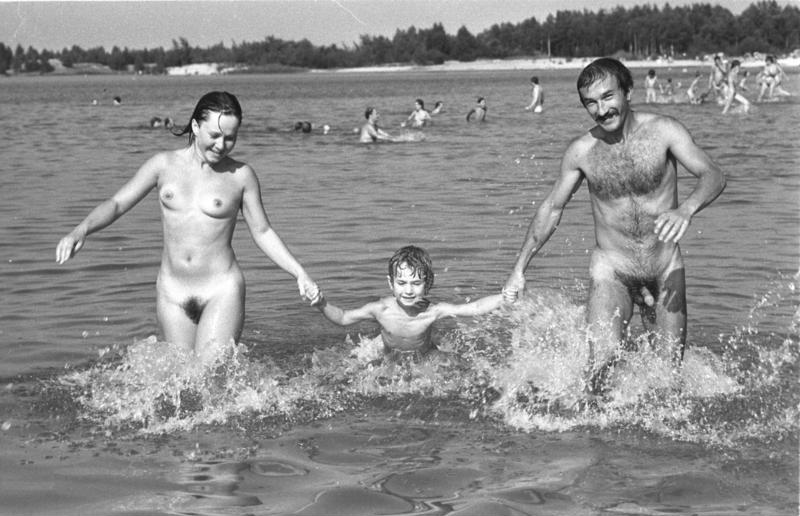
Naturism in Lake Senftenberg, GDR, 1983

There are many places where social nudity is practised for recreation in Europe. The following list includes nude beaches (also known as clothing-optional beaches or free beaches) and some naturist resorts.

== Albania ==
Naturism is not legal in Albania with public nudity being frowned upon by local authorities and communities. However, there exists a few spots mainly in the south where nudity is tolerated as follows:

- Dhermi beach at Dave's Bay near Gjileke and Drymades has been a popular naturist beach, however the construction of hotel complexes nearby has made almost impossible the practice of naturism.
- Zvernec at Dalan Beach near Porto Novo is popular with foreign naturist campers. However local authorities have prohibited camping from the resulting pollution as service facilities do not exist inside the protected area. Swimming in Porto Novo is not allowed as it is a dangerous beach. The area is monitored nightly by authorities.

== Austria ==
Naturism is popular in Austria, with social nudity places typically indicated by FKK signs. Designated locations include camping spots, beaches, and hotels.

- Fuschlsee
- Keutschacher See in Carinthia
- Pleschinger See
- Tigringer See
- Weikerlsee

In Vienna the following beaches can be found

- Donauinsel (an artificial island in the Danube quite close to the city centre)
- Gänsehäufel
- Lobau

== Belgium ==
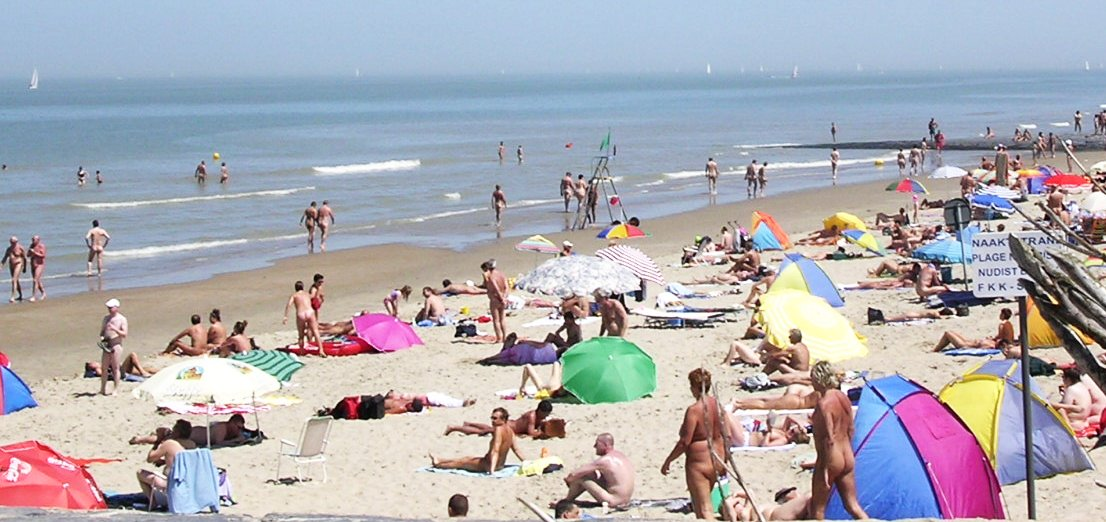
Bredene naturist beach in Belgium

Public saunas in Belgium are always mixed gender and nudity is the norm when using these. Topfree sunbathing is tolerated on all beaches.

- Bockstaelhoeve in Zegelsem
- Bredene was the first official nude beach in Belgium.
- Lombardsijde was announced in 2020 as the official second nude beach in the country, to open in 2021. However, this did not happen.
- Naturistencamping Grensland

=== Brussels-Capital Region ===
- Sport et soleil - Zon & Sport

=== Flanders ===
- Brunat
- Naturisme-Athena
- 't Vennebos Natuurleven in Langdorp-Aarschot
- Natuur Puur in Herselt
- Naturisme Solaris
- Zonneleven
- Ossendrecht
- Athena Hélios in Meerbeek – Vlaams-Brabant (nudist pool)
- Athena Ossendrecht Ossendrecht – Noord-Brabant NL (nudist pool)
- Athena Westland Oostende – Flandre occidentale (nudist pool)
- Solaris Mol – Antwerpen (nudist pool)

=== Wallonia ===
- Soynature
- NouNat ASBL
- Natmur
- Sol-Nat
- NATURE et SPORT HAINAUT
- WapiNat
- Le-Perron
- Athena Le Perron naturist camping site in Waimes
- Nature & Sport Hainaut Ham-Sur-Heure – Hainaut (nudist pool)

== Bulgaria ==
Unlike the former East Germany, but like many other countries that were part of the Communist bloc Bulgaria's nudists were kept cordoned off behind tall fences. There are however a number beaches on the Bulgarian Black Sea Coast where nudism is practised; there are no official nude beaches. People always enter naked in public baths, but those are separate for men and women.

- Alepu
- Arkutino
- Baltata
- Camping Delfin
- Dolphin Beach
- Fichoza
- Galata
- Harmanite Beach
- Irakli
- Lipite
- Listi
- Nirvana Beach
- Panorama
- Perla
- Primorsko
- Ropotamo Mouth
- Silistar
- Sinemorets
- Sozopol
- Sunny Beach
- Tsarski

== Croatia ==
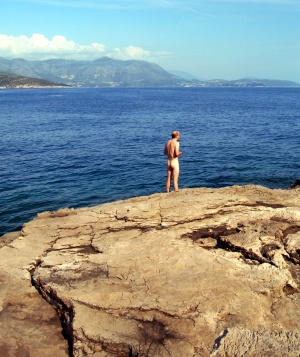
Nude bathing site on Lokrum island near Dubrovnik

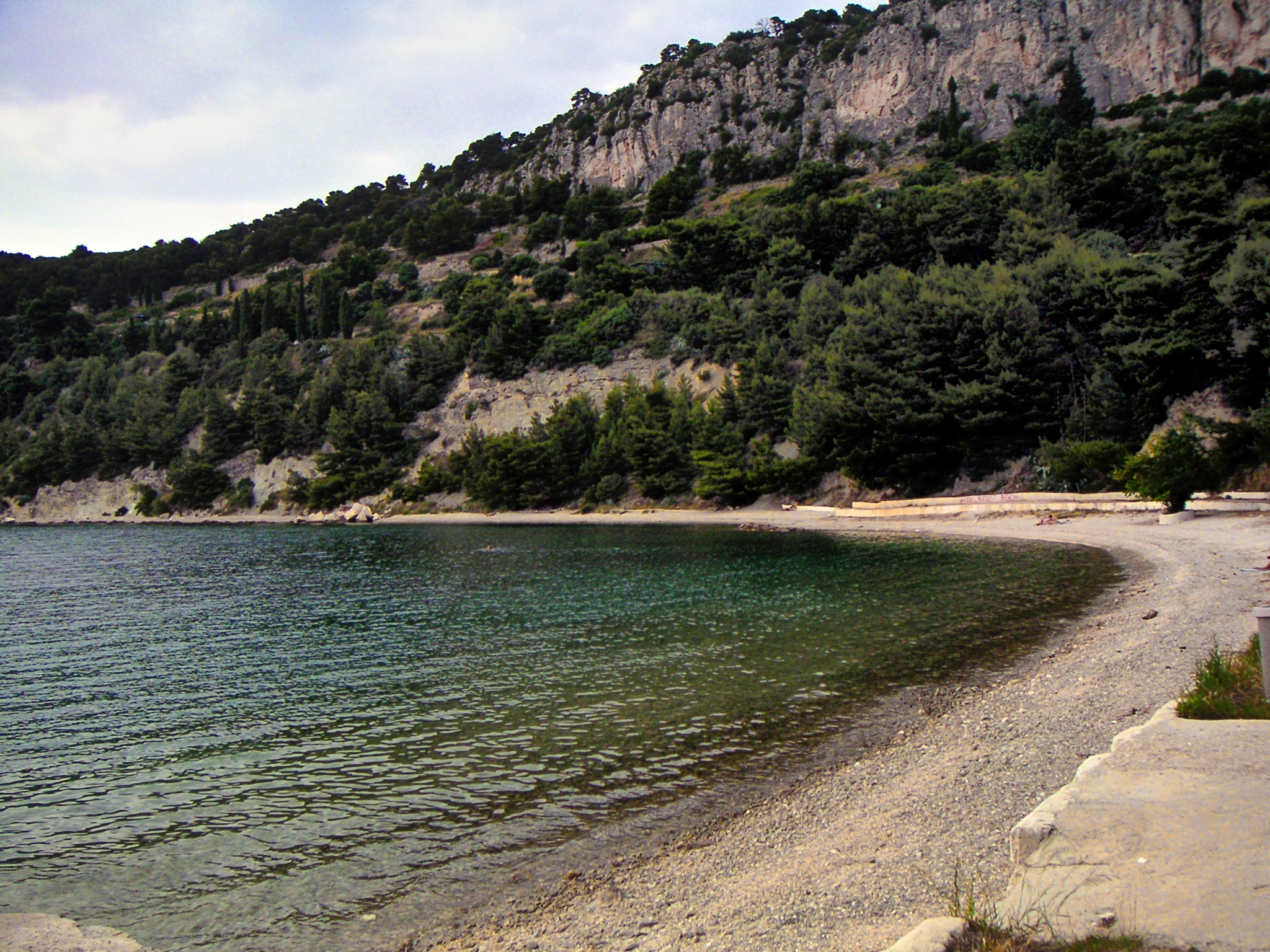
Kasjuni beach near Split

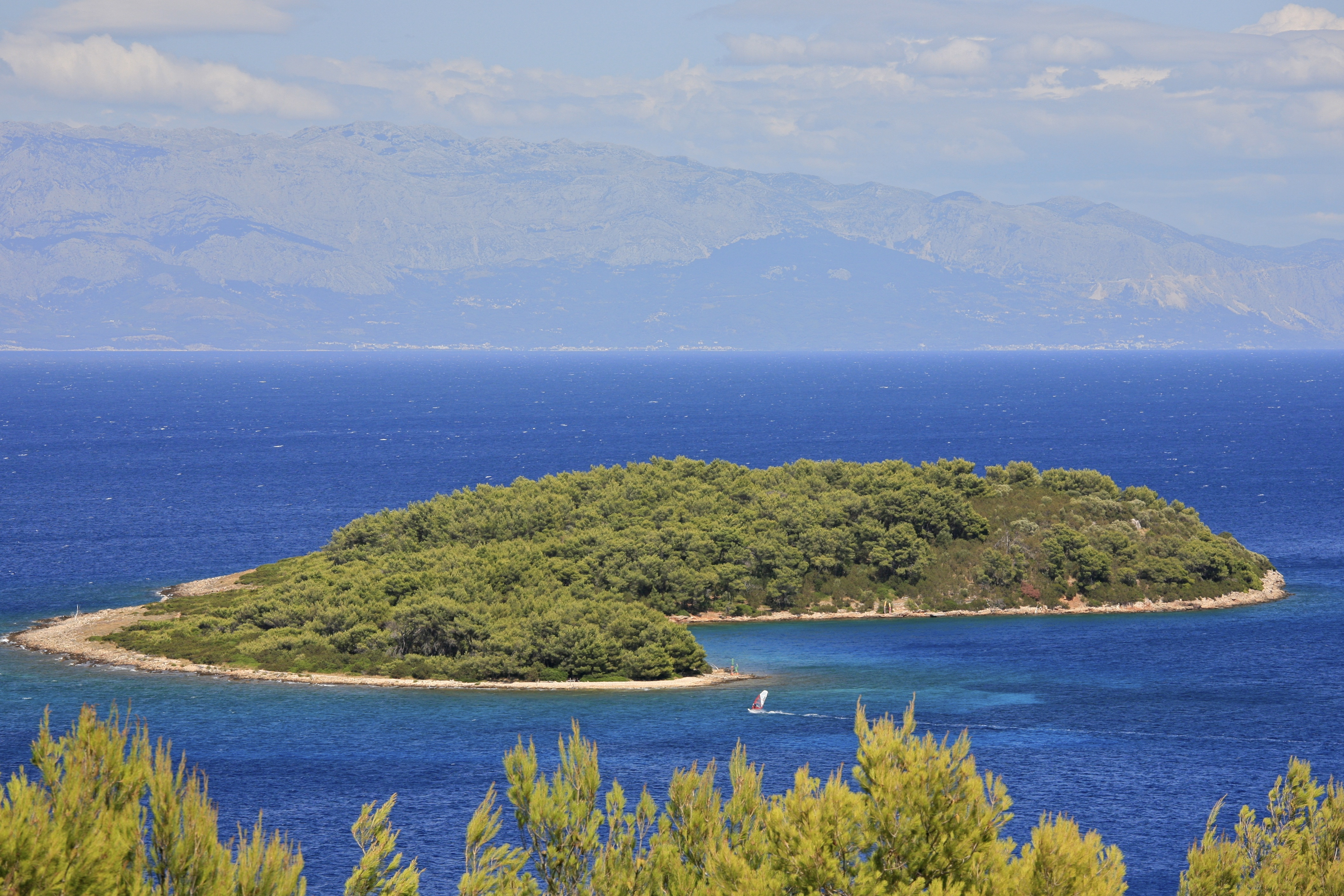
Zečevo, a naturist island with pebble beaches and pine woods, 15 minutes by boat from Jelsa, Island Hvar

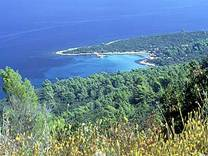
Mlaska beach, Island Hvar

Croatia has a well developed naturist culture with campsites and hotels specifically catering for naturists. Naturism has been popular in Croatia ever since the future King Edward VIII and his then-mistress, Wallis Simpson, were allowed to swim nude at one of Rab's beaches in 1936. Toplessness is permitted on most beaches.

=== Istria peninsula ===
On the Istria peninsula the following nude beaches and resorts can be found:

- Camp Kanegra, Crveni Vrh
- Camping Valalta, located at 45°07′22″N 13°37′47″E near Rovinj.
- Camping Zelena Laguna, Poreč
- Kamp Kažela, Medulin
- Kamp Ulika, Červar
- Naturist Park Koversada, located at 45°08′6.5″N 13°36′18.5″E near Vrsar is the biggest and one of the first naturist resorts in Europe.
- Naturist Resort Solaris, located at 45°17′13″N 13°35′08″E near Poreč.

=== Kvarner gulf ===
In the Kvarner gulf the following nude beaches and resorts can be found:

- Camping Strasko, Novalja
- Losinj island, Mali Lošinj, FKK beaches like Sunčana Uvala located around 44°31′15″N 14°27′45″E.
- Baldarin near Punta Križa, located at 44°36′56″N 14°30′28″E.
- On Krk island there are a number of naturist beaches and at least two naturist camping resorts, namely Camping Konobe and Naturist Camp Bunculuka Camping Konobe is located at 44°59′39″N 14°37′36″E and Naturist Camp Bunculuka is located at 44°58′10″N 14°46′03″E. There is also a new naturist beach with restaurant called FKK Kandarola Beach

=== Dalmatia ===
In Dalmatia gulf the following nude beaches and resorts can be found:

- Camp Sovinje, Tkon
- Glavica Beach and Camp Nudist, Vrboska, Island of Hvar
- Jerolim, Paklinski Islands, Island of Hvar
- Kamp Mlaska, Sućuraj, Island of Hvar
- Lokrum island (beach), Dubrovnik.
- Mekićevica Beach, Hvar (150 m west of Robinson restaurant).
- Nugal Beach, between Makarska and Tučepi.
- Robinson beach, Hvar. Toplessness is common, and naturism begins 50 metres south of the restaurant.
- Sv. Petar beach, central Makarska town.
- Zecevo Beach, Island Zečevo Vrboska, Island of Hvar
- Zlatni Rat (Bol, island of Brac). Toplessness is common on the whole spit. Naturism is common on the north-western portion of the beach (on the west side, away from the tip of the spit) and there is a small naturist beach to the west, beyond the rocks. There are additional naturist beaches further west, which can be reached from the promenade via steep paths.

== Cyprus ==
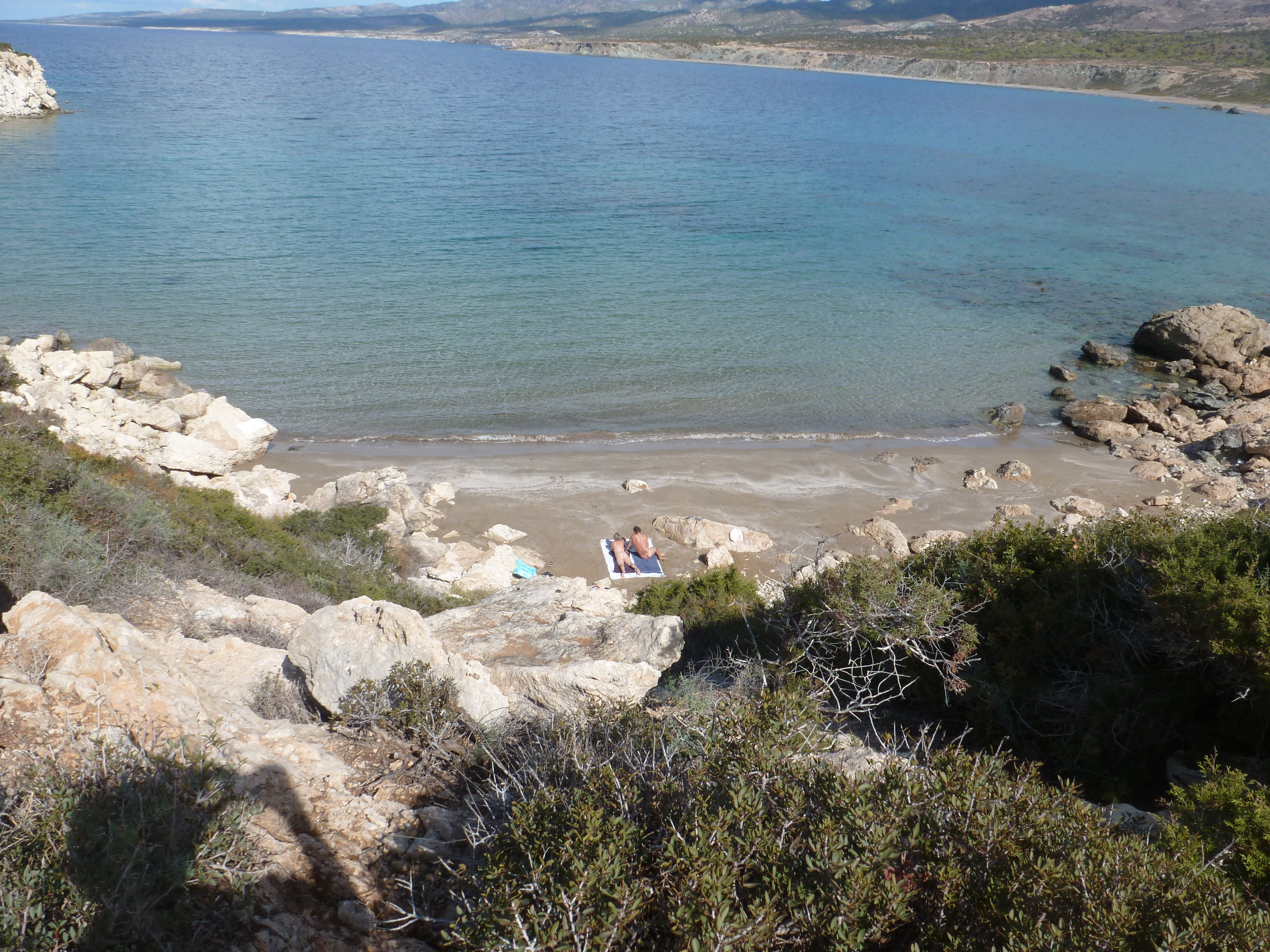
Ammoui Beach, Cyprus

There are no legal nudist beaches in Cyprus. A number of beaches, including the beach at Avdimou, have signs warning that nudism is not permitted. A community leader of Pissouri said that for decades there has been an "unspoken understanding" whereby nudism would be tolerated at an area away from the main beach at Pissouri, but not on the beach of Pissouri Bay. According to the community leader, nudists may visit the area which is on the eastern side of the bay, beyond the cliffs, as it offers some privacy.

- Ammoui Beach, Lara Beach is located in the Akamas Peninsula in the Paphos District of Cyprus. It is a long sandy beach and is quiet for its size. Nudists stay at the far end near the white cliffs.
- Paphos - Akamas - Lara Beach is the turtle beach, a sandy beach with warm water. Nudists are found there mostly during the winter as the weather is pleasant all year around.
- Paphos -Mandria - Hidden Beach located on the east side of the village is situated at the bottom of the cliffs providing shelter from wandering eyes. The beach also has multiple smaller beaches between the giant boulders perfect for private nude sunbathing
- Golden Sand Beach, Karpas, located in north east of the island. The nudist area is at the west end of the beach.

== Czech Republic ==
- There are about one hundred officially recognized naturist localities.

== Denmark ==
Since 1976 it is permissible to be nude at any beach in Denmark. There are more than 7,000 kilometres (4,300 mi) of coastline. A large number of clothing-optional beaches exist throughout the country.

The beach at the village of Husby in the Holstebro Municipality is being promoted as a Freikörperkultur (FKK) beach.

Bellevue Beach near Copenhagen has a popular nudist section.

Naturist swims are held in the Blovstrød (Allerød Municipality) indoor swimming pool on Friday evenings in Autumn.

== Estonia ==
- Narva-Jõesuu nude beach – Located near Narva-Jõesuu town, 2 km SW from the town border.
- Pärnu has an unofficial but tolerated unisex beach between the official beach and Pärnu river.
- Saaremaa has unofficial nude beach at Järve. Nudists use beach area near "Järve turismitalu" road sign. 58°11′15″N 22°16′01″E
- Tallinn has an unofficial, but tolerated naturist beach. It is situated about 3 km north-west of the ferry port, at the very northern end of the textile beach. The nude beach is west of the textile beach at Pikakari beach. A few minutes walk through the forest, around 59°28′34″N 24°43′09″E
- Tartu has an unofficial naturist lawn beach near the city one at the end of Ranna tee (on the other side of the Emajõgi river from Supilinn pond).

== Finland ==
- Tulliranta Beach near Hanko has a designated nudist section.

== France ==
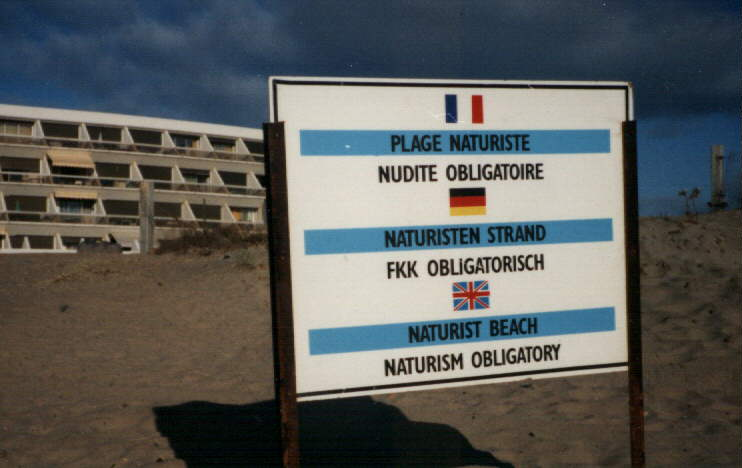
Cap d'Agde Naturist Village, French nude beach

- There are many naturist resorts on the Atlantic coast, for example CHM Montalivet, Euronat and La Jenny.
- The Mediterranean seaside town of Cap d'Agde has a large naturist village with sandy beach, several swimming pools, but also nude shopping.
- Aphrodite Village, Oasis Village, Village camping Ulysse, Eden Plage, are open 300 days per year.
- Île du Levant, an island in the Mediterranean Sea has a nudist town, Héliopolis, and a nudist beach known as Plage des Grottes.
- Leucate, which is a group of nudist hotels and resorts, in practice the group of hotels and restaurants and nudist beach make up the nudist Village of Leucate Naturist Villages, and a 1,200 metres (1,300 yd) long beach.
- Plage du Layet near Cavalaire.
- Plage de Pampelonne in Ramatuelle near Saint-Tropez
- There are beaches on many rivers, some well known, some informal: Cèze, Ardèche, Truyère
- “Naturisme & Terroirs”, Family Naturist Campsites All Over France Pallieter naturist campsite, l’Oliviere naturist farm, Les Manoques Naturist Campsite, The Domaine De Sarraute Naturist Campsite, Le Haut Chandelalar Naturist Campsite, Messidor Naturist Campsite, Le Village Du Bosc Naturist Campsite, Le Mas De La Balma Naturist Campsite.
- Naturism Magazine in France (French Federation of Naturism) Guide of the year 2021 indicating places where naturism is practiced in France (In French).

=== Alsace ===
Naturist venues in Alsace.

- Association Naturiste de Sauvegarde et d’Animation du Blauelsand (ANSAB)
- Centre Gymnique d’Alsace
- Club du Soleil Mulhouse
- Gravière du Blauelsand (Beach)
- Les Naturistes d’Alsace

=== Aquitaine ===
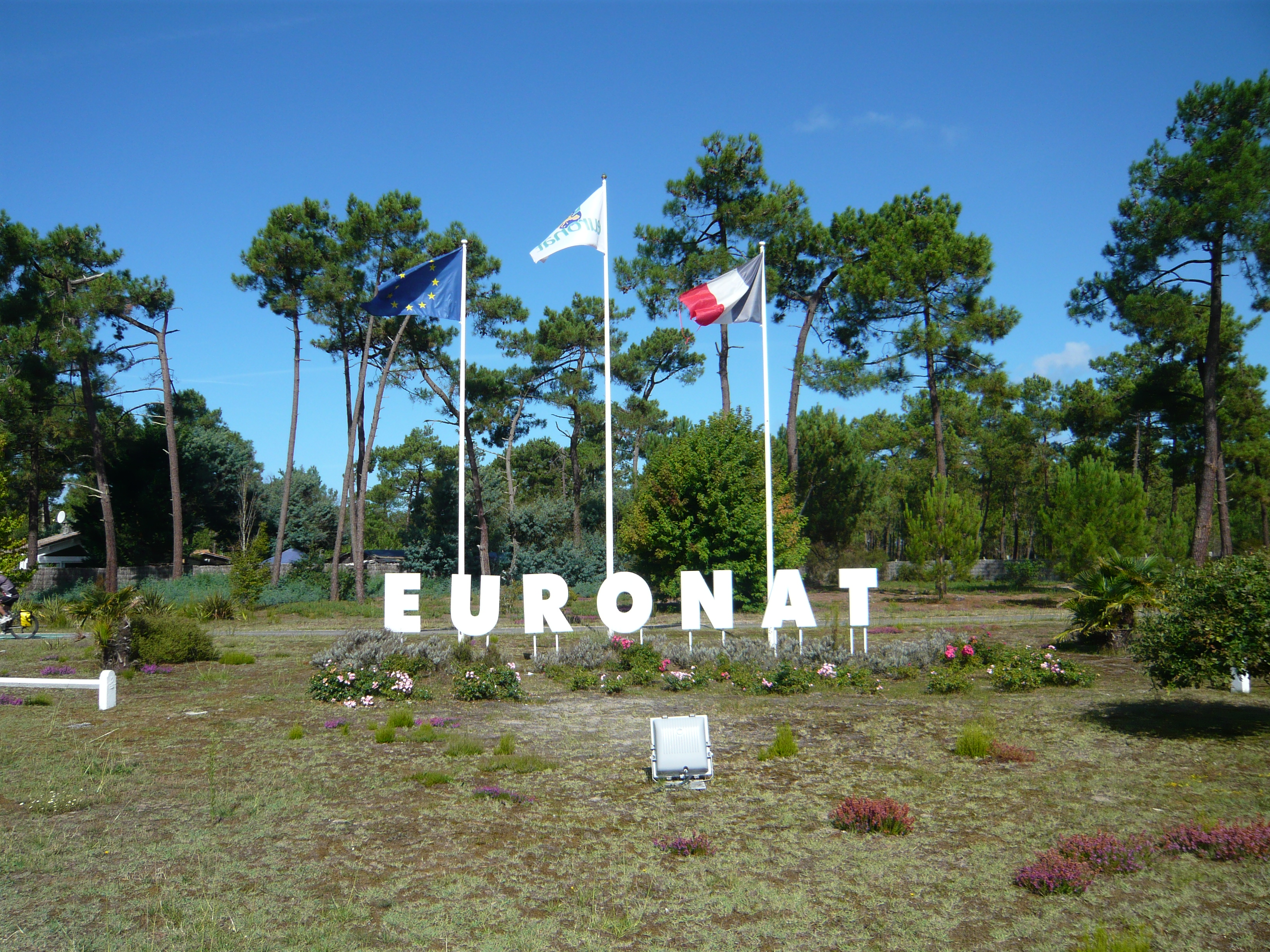
Entrance to the Euronat naturist resort in France

Naturist venues in Aquitaine.

- Arnaoutchot Arna Natu-Resort and Spa in Vielle-Saint-Girons
- Association Naturiste d’Euronat et du Sud-Ouest (ANESO)
- Camping Naturiste du Port
- Bouhebent Naturisme
- Camping Naturiste Le Coteau de l’Herm in Dordogne
- Camping Naturiste Le Couderc in Dordogne
- Centre Hélio-Marin de Montalivet
- Centre Naturiste Terme d'Astor in Dordogne
- Château Guiton
- Club du Soleil Bordeaux Côte d’Argent
- Club du Soleil Dordogne Périgord
- Club Hendaye Nature et Soleil du Pays Basque (CHENASO)
- Club Loisirs Naturiste du Centre Hélio-Marin de Montalivet
- Club Naturiste des Pays de l’Adour / Les Coges
- Domaine naturiste de Chaudeau in Saint-Géraud-de-Corps
- Euronat
- FEN Le Coteau de l'Herm in Rouffignac-Saint-Cernin
- Hossegor
- La Jenny in Le Porge
- La Lagune
- Laborde in Monflanquin
- Laulurie en Périgord
- Le Marcassin de Saint-Aubin
- Les Manoques
- Les Naturistes amis de la Côte Aquitaine (NACA)
- Plage du Métro à Tarnos (Beach)
- Montalivet
- Plage Naturiste D'ondres (Beach)
- Saint-Nicolas
- Seignosse
- Terme d’Astor
- Thermes de Salies-de-Béarn

=== Auvergne ===
Naturist venues in Auvergne.

- Amicale Des Naturistes Montluçonnais Montluçon
- Cantal Soleil Nature (Cansonat)
- Centre Aqualudique De La Loue Montluçon
- Club du Soleil de Clermont-Ferrand / La Serre de Portelas
- Club du Soleil de Lyon
- Domaine de la Taillade
- Ferme du Feyt
- La Chambre d’Alice
- Camping naturiste La Serre de Portela
- Les Fourneaux
- Nature et Amitié d’Ébreuil
- La Basse Royauté
- La Plage des Templiers (Naturist campsite in the Gorges de l'Ardèche)
- La Robertanne: Association "Club du Soleil de Saint-Étienne"
- Le Chapinan: Club du Soleil Savoie Nature. (CSSN)
- Le Courtialet: Association "Club du Soleil de Grenoble"
- Le Dorier, camping naturiste associatif
- Le Pont d'Adèle
- Le Sappey: Club du Soleil du Mont Blanc
- Les Hérissons: (Club du Soleil Les Hérissons)
- Camping Val drome Soleil
- Aux Dômes Auverg’Nats

=== Basse-Normandie ===
- Club du Soleil Normandie-Maine
- La Pointe du Banc (Beach)
- Nature et Soleil de Normandie
- Plage soleil et Naturisme (Beach)
- Pointe d’Agon (Beach)
- Saint-Germain naturisme
- Les naturistes Rouennais
- Club du Soleil de la porte Océane
- Club naturiste du Bois Mareuil
- LA POMME DORÉE Club des Naturistes de l'Eure

=== Bretagne ===
Naturist venues in Bretagne

- Association des Randonneurs Naturistes de Bretagne (ARNB)
- Association naturiste et sportive de la Côte d’Émeraude (ANSCE)
- Association Naturiste Finistérienne (Anf)
- Club du Soleil de Rennes
- Club du Soleil des Côtes-d’Armor
- Club naturiste de Bretagne Sud / La Pinède
- Club naturiste morbihanais / Camping Les Bruyères d’Arvor
- Erdeven-Kerminihy (Beach)
- Garden Gym
- Le Lourtouais (Beach)
- Les Chevrets (Beach)
- Mez An Aod ou Beg Leguer (Beach)
- Pallieter
- Piscine Foch
- Plage de Kéranouat (Beach)

=== Bourgogne ===
- Camping Naturiste Borvo 46°38′22″N 3°44′29″E
- Champagne Manoir
- Club du Soleil de Chalon-sur-Saône
- Club du Soleil de Dijon
- Club du Soleil de Mâcon-Laizé / La Breur
- Domaine de la Gagère
- L’Eau vive
- Le Gîte des Chênes
- Stade nautique d’Auxerre
- Club du Soleil de Troyes

=== Centre-Val de Loire ===
Naturist venues in Centre-Val de Loire.

- Association Joie et Santé / Les Bogues
- Aurore Plage Nature (Beach)
- Centre Aquatique
- Club des Amis du Châtaignier
- Club des Amis de La Petite Brenne
- Club du Soleil de Touraine
- Club du Soleil Berry Nivernais
- Club du Soleil du Loir-et-Cher
- Club Soleil et Loisirs de l’Indre
- La Petite Brenne
- Camping Le Moulin de la Ronde
- Piscine municipale d’Argenton-sur -Creuse

=== Champagne-Ardenne ===
Naturist venues in Champagne-Ardenne .

- Club du Soleil de Troyes
- Gymno Club De La Cressonnière Ardennaise (Gcca)
- Simplicité et Joie in Troyes

=== Corsica ===
Corsica is the fifth most popular naturist destination in France.

Naturist venues in Corsica

- Camping Rivabella in Aleria - Corse
- Camping Village Vacances Bagheera in Bravone - Corse
- Club Aqua Nature de Balagne C/O Jean-Jacques Santoni
- Club Corsicana
- Corsica Natura
- Domaine de Bagheera
- Les Eucalyptus
- Riva Bella Nature Thalasso & Spa Resort
- Village La Chiappa
- U’Furu
- San Giuseppe, Coggia (Beach)
- Grand Capo di Feno, Ajaccio (Beach)
- Ricanto et Capitello, Ajaccio (Beach)
- Portigliolo, Propriano (Beach)
- Stagnolu, Bonifacio (Beach)
- Carataggio (Tahiti), Porto-Vecchio (Beach)
- Plage de la Chiappa, Porto-Vecchio (Beach)
- Plage de Riva Bella, Linguizzetta (Beach)
- Plage de Bagheera, Linguizzetta (Beach)
- Plage de Tropica, Linguizzetta (Beach)
- Chiorusa, Linguizzetta (Beach)
- Saleccia, Santo-Pietro-di-Tenda (Beach)
- Lozari, Belgodere (Beach)
- Bodri, Corbara (Beach)
- Aregno, Algajola (Beach).

=== Franche-Comté ===
- Chalain Nature
- Club du Soleil de Belfort-Montbéliard
- Club du Soleil de Dole
- Club Naturiste de Besançon
- Lac de Chalain

=== Haute-Normandie ===
- Association Familiale des Naturistes Valériquais
- Association Naturiste du Département de l’Eure
- Camping Club de France (siège national)
- Club des Naturistes Rouennais / La Chênaie
- Club du Soleil de la Porte Océane
- Club naturiste du Bois Mareuil
- L’Escamet (Beach)
- Piscine municipale République

=== Île-de-France ===
Naturist venues in Île-de-France

- Air et Soleil
- Association des Jeunes Naturistes de France (AJNF)
- Association des Naturistes de Paris
- Association pour le Naturisme en Liberté (APNEL)
- Club du Soleil de l’Essonne / Les Bois de Valence
- Club du Soleil de Versailles
- Club du Soleil France
- Club du Soleil Nature
- Club gymnique de France (CGF)
- Fédération Française de Camping Caravaning (FFCC)
- Héliomonde, leisure naturist village in Ile-de-France.
- Club Imaginat
- Les Hespérides
- Nautena (Nautisme et Naturisme) in Paris, France
- Symbiose in Paris, France
- Camping club de France
- Club du Soleil de Creil
- Vexinue
- Naktivity

=== Languedoc-Roussillon ===
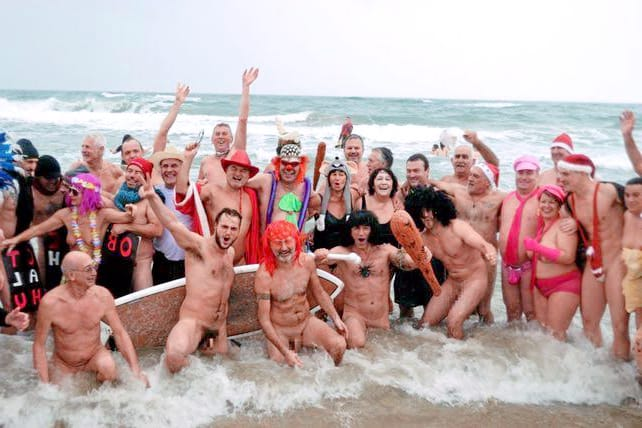
Nudity Beach in Cap d'Agde

The following are nudist venues in the Languedoc-Roussillon region.

- Aphrodite Village
- Au Paradis bleu
- Camping Château de Fereyrolles
- Camping Naturiste La Source Saint-Pierre
- Camping Naturiste Le Clapotis in La Palme
- Camping Naturiste Le Clos de Ferrand Sérignan
- Camping Naturiste La Grande Cosse
- Camping Sérignan Plage Nature in Sérignan Plage
- Centre naturiste Oltra
- CHMI La Grande Cosse
- Club du Soleil Languedoc
- Club Naturiste du Cap d’Agde (CNCA)
- Club naturiste du Ventous
- Domaine de La Genèse in Méjannes-le-Clap
- Domaine de La Sablière in Barjac
- Domaine de la Vitarelle
- Domaine de Lambeyran
- Domaine Le Clols
- GCU Ulysse
- Gymno Club Méditerranéen
- La Clapère
- La Combe de Ferrière
- La Genèse
- La Grande Cosse
- La Sablière
- Le Cap d'Agde
- Le Clapotis
- Le Mas de la Balma
- Le Mas de Lignières
- Le P’tit Bonheur
- Le Sérignan Plage Nature
- Le Ventous
- Le Village du Bosc
- Les Grifouls
- Les Mateilles (Beach)
- Les Montilles – Port-La-Nouvelle in Narbonne
- L’Espiguette (Beach)
- Leucate
- Plage Naturiste du Camping la Grande Cosse
- Piscine des Contamines
- Piscine Mental’O
- Pisse-Vache in Narbonne
- Plage La Genèse (Beach)
- Résidence Aphrodite
- Résidence Éden
- Résidence Jardin de Vénus
- Résidence Mas de la Plage
- Résidence Oasis
- Résidence Ulysse
- Résidences de la Jetée
- Sérignan-Plage
- Solidarités Naturistes
- Torreilles (Beach)
- Ulysse Nature
- Vivre à Vénus
- Vivre aux Mas de la Plage

=== Limousin ===
Naturist venues in Limousin.

- Camping Aimée Porcher
- Camping Lous Suais
- Club du Soleil de Limoges / Bos-Redon
- Club du Soleil Aunis et Saintonge
- Club du Soleil de Poitiers
- Club Naturiste des Charentes
- CS LIMOGES
- NATCO (Naturistes Corréziens)
- Creuse Nature Naturisme in Boussac - Limousin
- Domaine des Monts de Bussy in Eymoutiers - Limousin
- Domaine Naturiste Le Fayard
- Lac de Vassivière
- Le Mas d’Ayen
- Les Saules
- Natco (Naturistes Corréziens)
- Piscine Saint-Lazare

=== Lorraine ===
Naturist venues in Lorraine.

- Club du Soleil de Nancy
- Club du Soleil des Vosges
- Club naturiste de la Meuse
- Lorraine Nature de Thionville
- Piscine Ronde Thermale
- Piscine Olympique Roger Goujon
- Union Gymnique de Lorraine

=== Midi-Pyrénées ===
Naturist venues in Midi-Pyrénées.

- Camping de la Lèze
- Camping Hélio Nature L'Églantière in Castelnau-Magnoac
- Camping Naturiste Deveze in Gaudonville
- Camping Naturiste Les Aillos in Caraman - Midi-pyrénées
- Centre Naturiste Le Fiscalou Puycelsi - Midi-pyrénées
- Club du Soleil de Valeilles
- Club naturiste en Albigeois / La Couliche
- Domaine de Lalbrade in Lugagnac - Midi-pyrénées
- Domaine de Sarraute
- Le Champ de Guiral
- Le Clos Barrat
- Le Fiscalou
- Les Aillos
- Les Grands Chênes
- Les Manoques
- Millefleurs

=== Nord-Pas-de-Calais ===
Naturist venues in Nord-Pas-de-Calais.

- Association Gymnique Amicale du Boulonnais à la Somme (AGABS)
- Camping du Pont Charlet
- Centre Gymnique du Nord
- Club Originelle
- Éden Avesnois / Centre Aquadétente
- Élan Naturiste de la Côte d’Opale et sa Région (ENCOR)
- Natura International
- Piscine municipale d’Halluin
- Plage Nature (Beach and Camping)
- Plein Air Relax Club (PARC)

=== Pays de la Loire ===
Naturist venues in Pays de la Loire.

- Aquabaule
- Association Bol d’Air Naturiste (ABOLD’NAT)
- Association naturiste de la Côte d’Amour (ANCA) / Le Clos Marot
- Association naturiste vendéenne
- Choiseau (Beach)
- Club gymnique de l’Ouest (CGO) / La Chataigneraie d’Armor
- La Petite Vallée (Beach)
- La Pointe d’Arcay (Beach)
- La Terrière (Beach)
- Camping naturiste Le Colombier
- Le Petit Pont (Beach)
- Les Conches (Beach)
- Les Jaunais (Beach)
- Les Lays (Beach)
- Les Salins (Beach)
- Les Saulaies
- Loisirs Vacances Naturisme (LVN)
- Mayenne Nature
- NatAnjou
- Naturistes Sarthois
- Olonne-sur-Mer (Beach)
- Pen Bron (Beach)
- Piscine de Belle Beille
- Piscine de Coubertin
- Piscine Durantière

=== Picardie ===
- Club des Amis de Regain
- Club du Soleil de Creil
- Gymno Club de Thelle
- Plage de l’Amer Sud (Beach)
- SCN Regain

=== Poitou-Charentes ===
Naturist venues in Poitou-Charentes.

- Camping du Port
- Charente Soleil
- Club du Soleil de Poitiers / La Pardière
- Club Naturiste des Charentes
- Ferme naturiste L’Oliverie
- La Côte Sauvage : La Pointe Espagnole (Beach)
- La Giraudière (Oléron) (Beach)
- La Grande Côte : La Lède (Beach)
- La Grande Côte : Les Combôts (Beach)
- La Grande Plage (Oléron) (Beach)
- Camping Naturiste Le Petit Dauphin
- Les Saumonards (Oléron, après Boyardville)
- Nautilis centre nautique

=== Provence-Alpes-Côte d'Azur ===
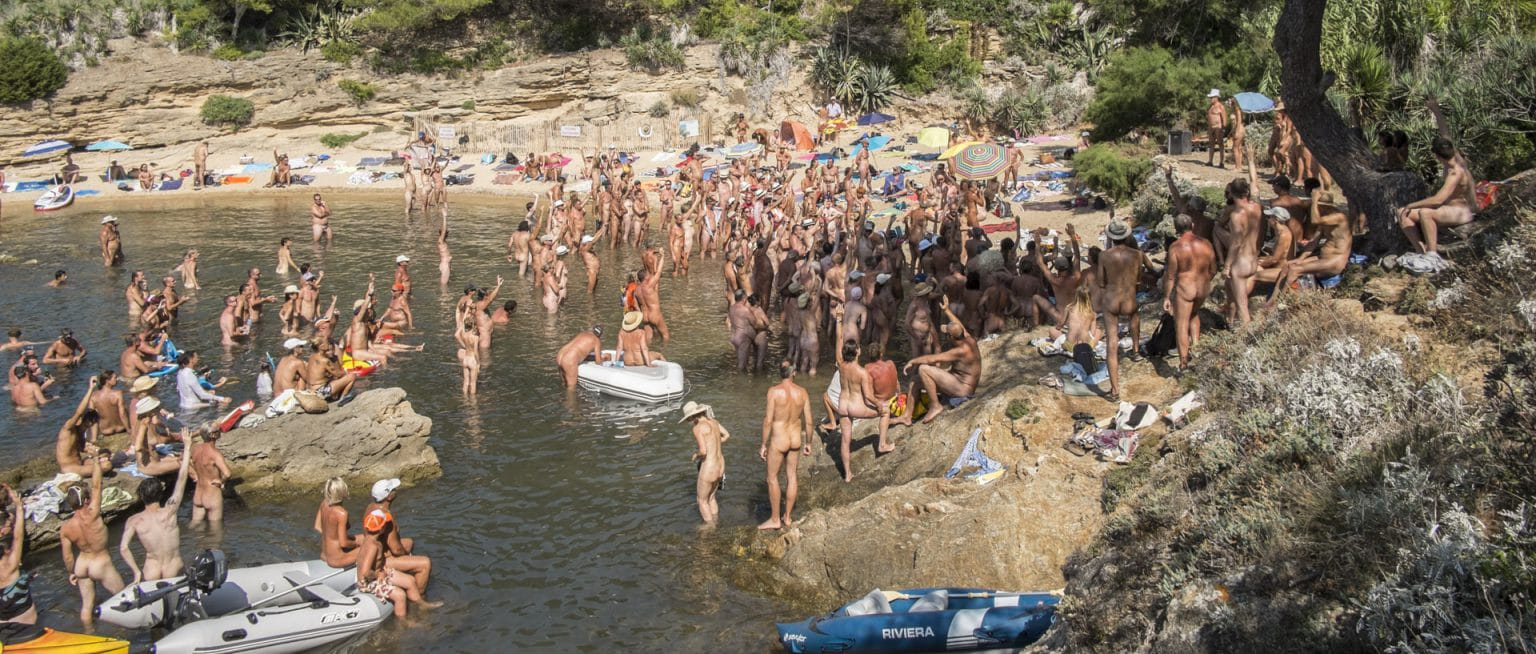
Plage des Grottes, Beach in Île du Levant, Héliopolis Nudist town, Nude people on a French nudity beach

Naturist venues in Provence-Alpes-Côte d'Azur.

- Amicale de la Plage Naturiste des Vieux Salins d’Hyères (APNVSH)
- Amoureux du Levant Naturiste (Aln)
- Association des Amis de l’Île du Levant (ADIL)
- Association Écovillage Naturiste Provence in Auriol
- Association Naturiste Phocéenne (Anp) in Marseille
- Bonnieu (Beach)
- Camargue Soleil in Arles
- Camping Verdon Provence in Esparron-de-Verdon
- Castillon de Provence
- Centre Pardigue
- Club du Soleil de Toulon
- Club gymnique de la Haute Garduère
- Club Naturiste de Bélézy Provence (CNBP)
- Domaine d’Enriou
- Domaine de Bélézy in Bédoin
- Domaine de l’Escride
- Domaine du Petit Arlane in Valensole
- Domaine Naturiste des Lauzons in Forcalquier
- Héliotel in Île du Levant
- La Batterie in Cannes (Beach)
- La Côte bleue (Beach)
- La Fourmi in Île du Levant
- La Pinède in Île du Levant
- La Tuquette
- Le Bau Rouge (Beach)
- Le Gros Pin (Beach)
- Le Haut Chandelalar
- Le Jonquet (Cap Sicié) Fabregas (Beach)
- Le Layet – Cavalière (Beach)
- Le Levant Naturiste
- Le Pradet – Plage du Monaco (Beach)
- Camping Le Vallon des Oiseaux
- Le Youkali
- Les Amis du Domaine du Jas du Sarraire
- Les Esclamandes – Plage de Fréjus / Saint-Aygulf (Beach)
- Les Grottes (Beach)
- Camping Les Lodges
- Les Pierres Blanches (Beach)
- Les Vieux Salins d’Hyères (Beach)
- Martigues Nature Soleil
- Mer et Soleil de Monaco
- Messidor
- Origan Village Théniers
- Pampelonne (Beach)
- Piémanson – Plage d’Arles (Beach)
- Piscine Tournesol
- Plage de l’Arène (Beach)
- Résidence de l’Escapade in Île du Levant
- Résidence Les Îles d’Or in Île du Levant
- Verdon Provence Esparron-de-Verdon
- Villa Marie Jeanne in Île du Levant Gay-Provence, Destination-Gay
- Nudist beach Plage des Grottes Île du Levant, an island in the Mediterranean Sea has a nudist town, Héliopolis,.
- CYCLONUE FRANCE
- Pourquoi Pas NU PROVENCE
- Les Pissarelles, Cap d'Ail (Beach)
- Plage de La Batterie, Golfe-Juan (Vallauris) (Beach)
- Pointe de l'Aiguille, Théoule-sur-Mer (Beach)
- Plage de l'Arêne, Cassis (Beach)
- Crique de Pamplemousse, Cassis (Beach)
- Pointe de Bon Voyage, Cassis (Beach)
- Pointe de la Cacau, Cassis (Beach)
- La Lèque, Marseille (Beach)
- Les Pierres Tombées (Sugiton), Marseille (Beach)
- Calanque des Queyrons, Marseille (Beach)
- Le Mont Rose, Marseille (Beach)
- Les Pierres Tombées (Côte Bleue), La Vesse (Le Rove) (Beach)
- Les Anthénors, Ensuès la Redonne (Beach)
- Plage de Bonnieu, Martigues (Beach)
- Piémanson, Salin de Giraud (Arles) (Beach)
- Plage de la Réserve, Saintes-Maries-de-la-Mer (Beach)
- Plage du Trayas, Le Trayas (St-Raphaël) (Beach)
- Les Esclamandes, Saint-Aygulf (Fréjus) (Beach)
- Le Gros Pin, Grimaud (Fréjus) (Beach)
- Le Gros Pin, Grimaud (Fréjus) (Beach)
- Pampelonne, Ramatuelle (Beach)
- Pampelonne, Ramatuelle (Beach)
- Baie de Bonporteau, L'Escalet (Ramatuelle) (Beach)
- Cap Taillat, La Croix-Valmer (Beach)
- Le Layet, Cavalière (Le Lavandou) (Beach)
- Plage des Grottes, Île du Levant (Hyères) (Beach)
- Les Vieux-Salins, Le Salins (Hyères) (Beach)
- Le Bau Rouge, Carqueiranne (Beach)
- Plage du Monaco, Le Pradet (Beach)
- Plage de la Mitre, Toulon (Beach)
- Le Jonquet, Fabrégas (La Seyne sur Mer) (Beach)

=== Rhône-Alpes ===
- Club du Soleil Alpes Léman
- Club du Soleil de Grenoble / Le Courtialet
- Club du Soleil de Lyon in Lyon
- Club du Soleil de Roanne
- Club du Soleil de Saint-Étienne / La Robertanne
- Club du Soleil de Valence
- Club du Soleil du Mont Blanc
- Club du Soleil du Nord Isère
- Club du Soleil Les Hérissons Sergy
- Club du Soleil Savoie Nature
- Club Naturiste des Gorges de l’Ardèche (Cnga)
- Domaine du Grand Bois
- Domaine du Pont d’Adèle
- Domaine Le Pont d'Adèle
- Gymno Club Rhodanien
- La Pinède
- Lac de Laffrey
- Le Chanozois 15 km of Bourg-en-Bresse
- Loisirs et Soleil de Saint Etienne / Le Dorier
- Piscine Bellevue
- Piscine Tournesol Valence le Haut
- Plage de la Mama (Beach)
- Plage des Templiers (Beach)
- Plage des Templiers in Bourg-Saint-Andréol - Rhône-alpes
- Val Drôme Soleil

=== Overseas departments ===
==== Caribbean ====
===== Guadeloupe in Antilles =====
- Plage Anse Tarare (Beach) The naturist beach of Saint-François in Guadeloupe is Anse Tarare. It is the only officially tolerated naturist beach on the island. It is located near Pointe des Châteaux.
- Plage naturiste de Sainte-Rose (Beach) other tolerated naturist beach.
- Domaine naturiste Lizardy (Nudist hotel Bungalows)

===== Martinique in Antilles =====
- Plage Petite Anse des Salines (Beach) It is the only officially tolerated naturist beach in Martinique.
- Plage Anse Trabaud (Beach) other tolerated naturist beach.
- Villa Fleurs De Canne Martinique (Nudist hotel).

===== St. Barths =====
Toplessness is common on most beaches. Nudity is encountered at:

- Gouveneur Beach (at the western end)
- Saline beach (towards the east and little further in the small bay called Petite Saline)

===== Saint Martin in Antilles =====
- Club Orient (Nudist residences, Destroyed in Hurricane Irma 2017, It has not been rebuilt to date).
- Plage Orient Bay (Beach).
- Résidence Adam & Eve (nudist hotel)
- The Jardin d'O is a couples-only clothing-optional resort located between Grand Case and Orient Bay.
- Kazanu is an adult-only clothing-optional (An adult-only Clothing optional stay).

==== Indian Ocean ====
===== Réunion Island in the Indian Ocean =====
- Plage de la Souris Chaude (Beach) The naturist beach of Réunion island. It is the only officially tolerated naturist beach on the island.
- Le Dalon Plage, Trois Bassins (nudist hotel gay-friendly).

== Germany ==
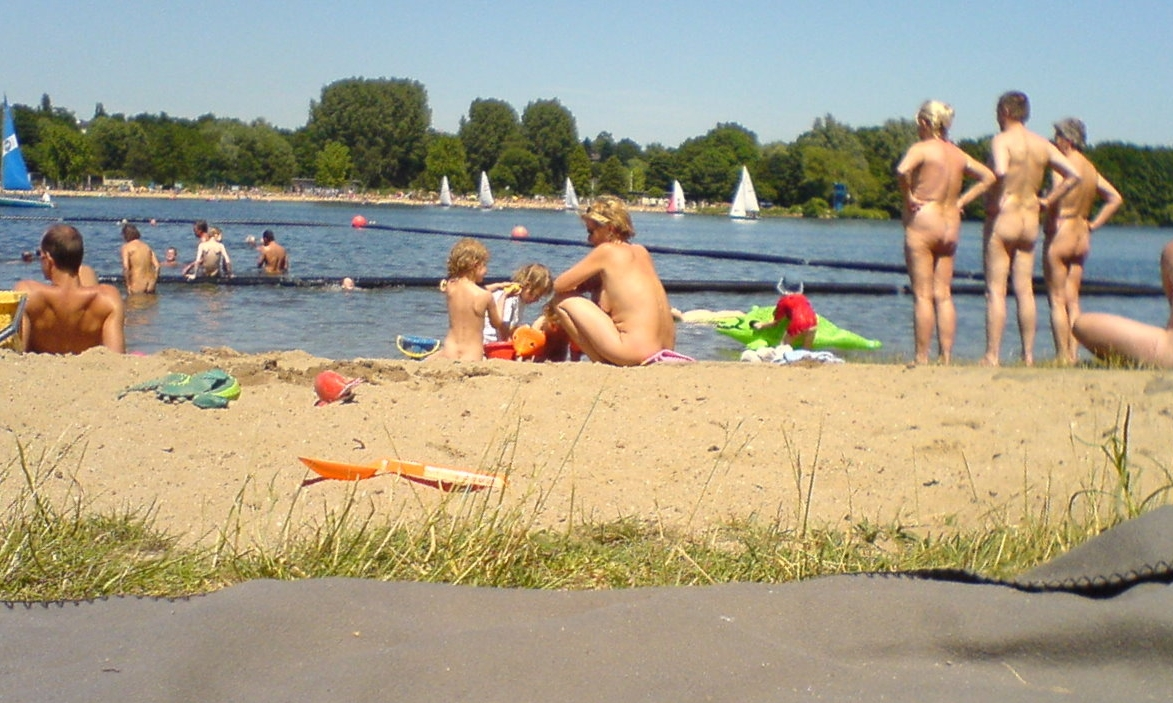
Naturist beach in Germany

Public nudity is not illegal in Germany but may be regulated by local authorities mostly because of safety and health issues, not morality. Apart from urban areas and public baths (some of which offer nude swimming days), nude bathing is common in Germany: unofficial clothing optional areas exist at most lakes and rivers and other sites, such as abandoned sand and rock quarries. Many designated Freikörperkultur (FKK – Free Body Culture) areas exist at the seaside, at lakes and in baths, especially in the former East Germany, where nudism remains more widespread than in the west. For example, Miramar (located in Weinheim), has a weekly FKK night where there is nude bathing in the entire complex - aside from the waterslides, which require a bathing suit to use. Many unregulated clothing optional (FKK) free beaches are available along the Nordsee and Baltic seashores, Rügen and other islands. The attitude is: all beaches are nude beaches until somebody complains. Families especially like to spend their leisure time in naturist areas; sauna bathing is generally practised in the nude.

The list of social nudity places in Germany includes:

- Baden-Baden is a city located near the French border. This city has many natural mineral springs and numerous clothes-free bathhouses are located there.
- Borkum
- Grömitz
- Lake Senftenberg, Oberspreewald-Lausitz, Brandenburg
- Norderney
- The Schönfeldwiese in the Englischer Garten, Munich as well as the southern part of Feldmochinger See, in the northwestern suburb, the peninsula in Lake Feringasee in the northeast and the de:Flaucher at the river Isar south of the city center of Munich.
- Strandbad Wannsee, Großer Wannsee, Wannsee, Berlin
- Sylt
- The Tiergarten, Berlin
- Travemünde
- Zeesen

== Greece ==
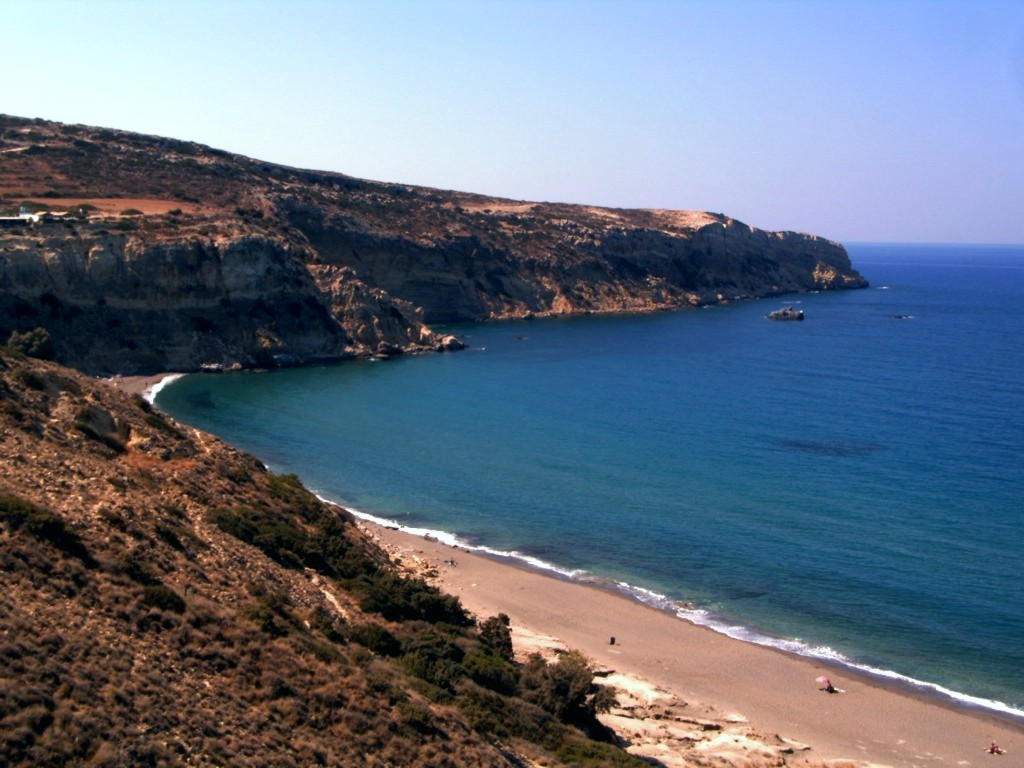
Komos Beach on the south coast of Crete, near Matala

Naturism is popular and widely practised on the Greek Islands and mainland although, strictly speaking, it is legal only in designated locations. However, on all of the islands there are unofficial nudist beaches. Toplessness is tolerated and accepted on all Greek beaches.

=== Crete ===
Beaches and resorts in Crete include:

- Diskos near Lentos
- Filaki beach, the only official nudist beach near the Vritomartis naturist resort.
- Glyka Nera (Sweet water beach) between Chora Sfakion and Loutro.
- North of Matala there is a long nude beach; the southern end of the beach is used by clothed people.
- Plakias, the southeastern part of the beach is used by naturists.
- Sougia, the eastern part of the beach is for nude bathing.

=== Other areas ===
- Kalamitsi nude beach on the peninsula of Chalkidiki in Central Macedonia.
- Katergo and Agios Nikolaos beaches on Folegandros island.
- Mantomata Beach (Note: Location of Mantomata beach 36°19′45″N 28°12′43″E) in Faliraki is the only official nudist beach on Rhodes, though there are more beaches where nudity is common, for example a part of Kallithea, Rhodes.
- Mirtiotissa beach (Paralia Mirtiotissa) on Corfu' island. A sandy beach surrounded by rocks, accessible by car. (Note: Location of Mirtiotissa beach39°35′45″N 19°47′57″E)
- Mouda beach, a great wild sandy beach south of Kefalonia island, Ionian Islands.
- Myrtos Beach, a long white pebble beach in Kefalonia.
- Paradise beach on Thasos island.
- Velanio beach on Skopelos island, Northern Sporades.
- Vlychada beach on Santorini; the southern part of the beach is used by naturists.
- Nude beaches, such as Neftina, have also been reported on the Greek island of Lemnos in the northeastern Aegean.

== Hungary ==
- Ányás,
- Délegyháza, Naturista Oázis Camping lake no. 5
- Kiskundorozsma, Sziksósfürdö (a.k.a. "Sziki")

== Iceland ==
Public nudity is not common. However, there are a number of hot springs across the island that are either free of charge or voluntary contribution based where nudity can be practised.

- Brennisteinsalda Laugasvæði
- Grjótagjá cave, next to Mývatn
- Guðrúnarlaug hot spring
- Hellulaug
- Hoffell Hot Tubs
- Hrunalaug (Hruni hot springs), Sólheimar, Iceland
- Jarðböðin við Mývatn
- Kualaug hot spring, Haukadalsvegur, Iceland
- Pollurinn hot springs
- Reykjadalur Hot Spring Trailhead, if you go to the lower pools downstream you can be naked and secluded from other hikers.
- Seljavellir Geothermal Pool

== Ireland ==
- Corballis, Donabate, County Dublin.
- Curracloe strand is used by naturists and has been proposed as an official naturist beach.
- Hawk Cliff/Whiterock Beach, Dalkey, County Dublin, is the first official nudist beach in Ireland. It opened in April 2018.
- Roundstone, County Galway.
- Sallymount Bay Beach near Brittas Bay, (Note: Location of Sallymount Bay Beach, Ireland 52°50′45″N 006°05′32″W) County Wicklow.
- Silver Strand Beach, Barna, County Galway.
- West Cork, County Cork.

== Italy ==
Female toplessness has been officially legalized (in a nonsexual context) in all public beaches and swimming pools throughout the country (unless otherwise specified by region, province or municipality by-laws) on 20 March 2000, when the Supreme Court of Cassation (through sentence No. 3557) has determined that the exposure of the nude female breast, after several decades, is now considered a "commonly accepted behavior", and therefore, has "entered into the social costume".

=== Abruzzo ===
- Official authorized nude-beach "Le Morge", in Torino di Sangro. (Note: location of the beach42°12′58″N 14°34′50″E)

=== Calabria ===
- Nudist beach of Pizzo Greco Naturist Camping, in Isola di Capo Rizzuto. (Note: location of the Pizzo Greco nudist beach 38°55′19″N 17°07′27″E)

=== Campania ===
- Official nude beach "Spiaggia del Troncone" (Troncone beach), in Marina di Camerota. State road SS 562, coming from Palinuro towards Marina di Camerota before entering tunnel. Located at 40.006826, 15.340612

The beach is protected by a rock wall, containing a recess with natural shade.

=== Emilia-Romagna ===
- Lido di Dante in Ravenna. Located at 44°23′20″N 12°18′00″E
- Oasi di Zello, thermal oasis near Monterenzio (Metropolitan City of Bologna).

=== Friuli-Venezia Giulia ===
- Cava Casali beach near Sistiana and Duino Trieste – km. 137 state road 14.
- Costa dei Barbari beach near Sistiana and Duino Trieste – km. 139 state road 14.
- Filtri beach near Sistiana and Grignano Trieste – km. 143 state road 14, difficult to reach.

=== Lazio ===
- Arenauta beach near Gaeta– km. 24,5 state road 213.
- Black sand beach (Spiaggia delle sabbie nere) is a beach on the coast South of the Santa Severa Castle. It has historically been frequented by naturists, and since 2021 it has been officially authorized for the practice of naturism.
- Lake Martignano, a small lake near Falconeto and Anguillara Sabazia. Entrance from the Anguillarese road, beach located at 42°06′30″N 12°19′30″E. The side to the right of the main beach, very far from the entrance, is reserved to nudism (avoid bringing music).
- Oasi di Capocotta, to the southwest, on the Tyrrhenian Sea, an official nudist beach on the coast between Ostia and Torvaianica.

=== Liguria ===
- Chiavari beach (an unofficial, but tolerated naturist beach, at western end of the textile beach).
- Guvano beach near Corniglia – The beach is accessible, from the railway station, via a disused railway tunnel.

=== Lombardy ===
- La Rocca nude beach in Manerba del Garda located at 45.552°N 10.578°E nudism from 1956. This is an unofficial Lake Garda nudist beach, and there are frequent police checks to fine those who are naked.

=== Piedmont ===
- Official nudist beach near Varallo Sesia.

=== Puglia ===
- Official nudist beach near Taranto, at Castellaneta Marina. It is called Termitosa beach and it has been authorized in 2024. The beach is sandy and the waters are shallow for many meters. There are no facilities nearby, it is very close to a small local railway station, the Castellaneta Marina railway station. (Note: location of the beach40°28′51″N 16°58′03″E)

=== Sardinia ===
- The municipality of Bari Sardo announced the possible future authorisation for nudism of part of the beach nearby, called Mindeddu beach.
- Capo Falcone near Stintino.
- Dunas de Piscinas, part of Costa verde, close to Arbus, has the biggest authorised nudist-beach in Europe, with roughly 800 meters of sand and dunes. It is a wild corner of Sardinia, with only one big hotel nearby (Note: location of the Piscinas nudist beach 39°32′09″N 8°26′42″E)
- Is Benas beach, on the Sardinian western coast, close to Oristano. It is a long sandy beach, surrounded by pine trees. This beach is rich in colorful shells. It has been authorized for naturism since 2022 . (Note: location of the Is Benas naturist beach 40°02′54″N 8°26′45″E)
- Marina di Arbus, Costa Verde. The rough west coast has lonely beaches and coves for sunbathing. The area is less developed for tourists, so you can enjoy nature.
- Part of the Porto Ferro beach, near Alghero and Sassari, is authorised for naturist bathing (Note: location of the Porto Ferro nudist beach 40°41′22″N 8°12′00″E)
- A secluded beach between Terra Mala and Geremeas is under authorization by the municipality of Quartu Sant'Elena.
- Hundreds of small, secluded beaches can occasionally become nudist corners. Traditional places are the beaches Cala di Volpe, Liscia di Vacca, to the north of Pitrizza Hotel and Piccolo Pevero beach, the far side to the right after the rocks.

=== Sicily ===
Many beaches in Sicily are topless, and there are also naturist beaches.

- The Baglio Maragani Country House has a dedicated naturist beach, available for the B&B customers or for daily visits (a fee is required)
- Bulala, Gela (CL), is an official naturist beach, authorized in 2016. It is a wide sandy beach, and at the moment no services are available. (Note: location of the Bulala beach 37°02′06″N 14°18′01″E)
- Capo Feto beach in Mazara del Vallo
- Casello 41 beach in Selinunte
- Eloro–Marianelli beach within Vendicari nature reserve, in the municipality of Noto (SR). Suitable for naturist bathers and popular within the gay community.
- A small part of the beach at Marinello natural preserve between Oliveri and Patti (ME) has been unofficially attended by naturists for many years, especially in the low season.
- San Saba beach in Messina, on the Tyrrenian coast about 20 km from the city center, has been an official naturist beach since 2022.
- Torre Salsa, close to Siculiana, is inside a WWF protected area. On the eastern end of the beach, close to the white cliffs, there is an unofficial naturist wide sandy beach, mostly frequented by couples and families. (Note: location of the naturist part of the beach 37°21′17″N 13°21′27″E)

=== Tuscany ===
- Acquarilli, Capoliveri on Elba island
- Fetovaia, Marina di Campo on Elba island
- Spiaggia delle Tombe (Campo nell'Elba, Elba island), beach authorized for naturism
- Scogliera delle Piscine, Marina di Campo, Elba Island
- Campo Canata, Lacona, Elba island
- Scogliera del Bunker (bunker cliff), between the Felciaio beach and the Lido di Capoliveri on Elba island
- Scogliera del Sentiero (cliff of the trail), between the beaches of Barabarca and Zuccale, Capoliveri, on Elba island
- In Scheggianico, in the municipality of Firenzuola (Firenze), along the Diaterna river, a typical river beach in a mountain environment, historically frequented by naturists, supervised by the Diaterna Group.
- La Lecciona, in Torre del Lago Puccini (Viareggio), a beach authorized for naturist practices.
- Marina di Bibbona (Livorno) in the southernmost part of the beach
- Punta Combara naturist beach, in Livorno, south of the Calignaia Bridge.
- Punta del Miglio naturist beach (Livorno), north of the Calignania Bridge.
- Nido dell'Aquila in San Vincenzo (Livorno) (Note: location of the beach 43°02′06″N 10°31′35″E)
- In Bagni di Petriolo (between Grosseto and Siena) there are two free thermal areas, one textile area fed by virgin water, while the thermal area fed from the overlying spa is frequented almost exclusively by nudists.
- Some locations on the Farma torrent (on the border between Grosseto and Siena), upstream of Bagni di Petriolo, are destinations for naturists.
- Spiaggia delle Marze (beach of the slips), in the northernmost beach of Marina di Grosseto (Grosseto), beyond the last bathing establishment and close to the historic Fort Le Marze, which is frequented by naturists with great discretion.
- I Tronchi (the trunks) or Spiaggia delle Capanne (beach of the huts), south of Principina a Mare (Grosseto), with a fair number of naturists.
- In Marina di Alberese (Grosseto) naturism has always been accepted on all its beaches. Less frequently there are naturists on the northern beaches, while the greatest number of naturists can be found on the Beach of Collelungo and on the adjacent Ultima Spiaggia (Last Beach)
- Spiaggia La Feniglia (Porto Ercole), immersed in greenery and surrounded by shrubs and dunes, perfect for nature lovers. It is located in the Protected Natural Reserve of Duna Feniglia.
- A nudist beach is in Capalbio, inside the Burano Lake State Reserve, WWF Oasis

=== Veneto ===
- Alberoni beach, Lido di Venezia, Venice.
- Baia delle sirene at Punta S. Vigilio near the town of Garda (VR).
- Costa sabbiosa Lazzaretto, Verona
- Spiaggia del Mort Nudist Beach on Isola del Mort, near Jesolo.

== Latvia ==
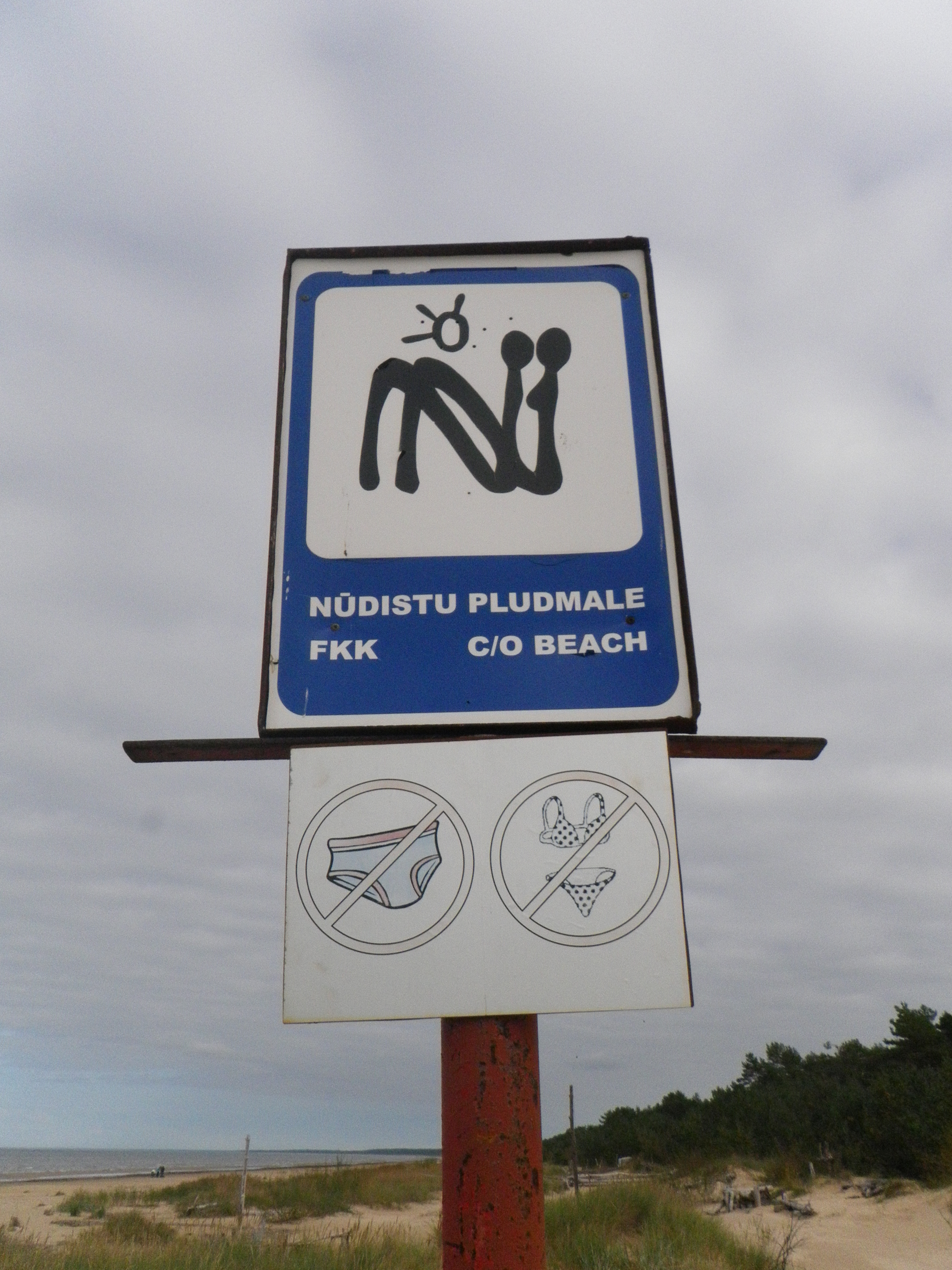
Vecāķi nude beach, Rīga

Latvian naturist beaches are overseen by the Latvian Naturist Association. Beach list has been completed using official sources, as well as local naturist communities.

- Jūrmala official naturist beach located in the Lielupe district, a few hundred meters from the Lielupe river mouth. A rather small and crowded beach, close to Riga and rather easily reachable by train. The naturist beach boundaries are clearly marked with official signage.
- Vecāķi official naturist beach in Rīga. A historical naturist beach within close proximity from public transport and paid parking on street. In 2024 it was named one of the best Naturist Beaches in the World, ranking in the 23rd place.
- Saulkrasti official naturist beach in Lilaste, near Inčupe. Historically one of the longest nudist beaches in Europe. Local council is trying to reduce the size of the beach, but it still remains approximately 1 kilometre (2/3 mile) long, covered in white sand. Reaching the beach requires a calm 20min walk through the woods. Official signage was put up in 2024.
- Liepāja official naturist beach. Also quite small, situated about 3 km south of Liepaja. Green signs mark the beginning and the end of the beach. It has removable toilet during the summer.
- Ventspils city has an official naturist beach.

== Lithuania ==
Nudist beaches in Lithuania are overseen by local communities. Nida's nudist beach is frequently featured in rankings of world's best nudist beaches.

Official sign	Official nudist beaches	City/Municipality	Officially opened
	Alytus nudist beach (Note: Location of the Alytus nudist beach 54°22′16″N 24°05′35″E)	Alytus	2023
	Elektrėnai nudist beach (Note: Location of the Elektrėnai nudist beach 54°43′49″N 24°41′14″E)	Elektrėnai	2024
	Giruliai nudist beach (Note: Location of the Giruliai nudist beach 55°46′26″N 21°04′32″E)	Klaipėda	2005
	Juodkrantė nudist beach (Note: Location of the Juodkrantė nudist beach 55°31′58″N 21°05′50″E)	Neringa	2021
	Marijampolė nudist beach (Note: Location of the Marijampolė nudist beach 54°31′16″N 23°20′54″E)	Marijampolė	2021
	Nida nudist beach (Note: Location of the Nida nudist beach 55°18′01″N 20°58′22″E)	Neringa	2008
	Pajūris nudist beach (Note: Location of the Pajūris nudist beach 55°51′57″N 21°03′28″E)	Palanga	2022
	Panevėžys nudist beach (Note: Location of the Panevėžys nudist beach 55°44′15″N 24°23′59″E)	Panevėžys	2024
	Pervalka nudist beach (Note: Location of the Pervalka nudist beach 55°25′10″N 21°03′19″E)	Neringa	2022
	Preila nudist beach (Note: Location of the Preila nudist beach 55°22′33″N 21°01′46″E)	Neringa	2022
	Smiltynė nudist beach (Note: Location of the Smiltynė nudist beach 55°41′21″N 21°06′04″E)	Klaipėda	2005
	Šventoji nudist beach (Note: Location of the Šventoji nudist beach 56°00′42″N 21°04′21″E)	Palanga	2016
	Valakampiai nudist beach (Note: Location of the Valakampiai nudist beach 54°44′44″N 25°17′42″E)	Vilnius	2020
	Vėlykštis nudist beach (Note: Location of the Vėlykštis nudist beach 55°19′11″N 26°12′53″E)	Ignalina District Municipality	2022

Unofficial nudist beaches	City/Municipality
Akmena nudist beach (Note: Location of the Akmena nudist beach 54°39′37″N 24°54′16″E)	Trakai
Karklė nudist beach (Note: Location of the Karklė nudist beach 55°49′07″N 21°03′53″E)	Klaipėda District Municipality
Nemirseta nudist beach (Note: Location of the Nemirseta nudist beach 55°53′16″N 21°03′13″E)	Palanga
Nemunas nudist beach (Note: Location of the Nemunas nudist beach 54°54′22″N 23°48′38″E)	Kaunas District Municipality

== Luxembourg ==
Naturist venues in Luxembourg..

- l'association Sports et Loisirs Naturistes, Luxembourg (SLNL).
- Thermes naturistes du Luxembourg Les Thermes.
- Thermes naturistes du Luxembourg Mondorf Domaine Thermal.

=== Canton of Diekirch ===
- Camping Bleesbruck (Bleesbruck)

=== Canton of Wiltz ===
- De Reenert (Wiltz)
- Plage de Burfelt (Beach)

== Montenegro ==
- Ada Bojana, the biggest nudist beach in the country.
- Camp Full Monte, A clothing optional, off-grid, eco campsite near the Montenegro/Croatia border crossing, run by an English couple.
- Crvena Glavica beach, Sveti Stefan
- Hotel Albatros in Ulcinj has two beaches, a textile beach, and a nudist beach.
- Njivice, a village on the south-western shore of the Bay of Herceg Novi (Boka Kotorska bay) the nudist beach is located on Hotel Riviera's beach
- Ratac, is outside Bar in the direction of Budva, near Sutomore

== Netherlands ==
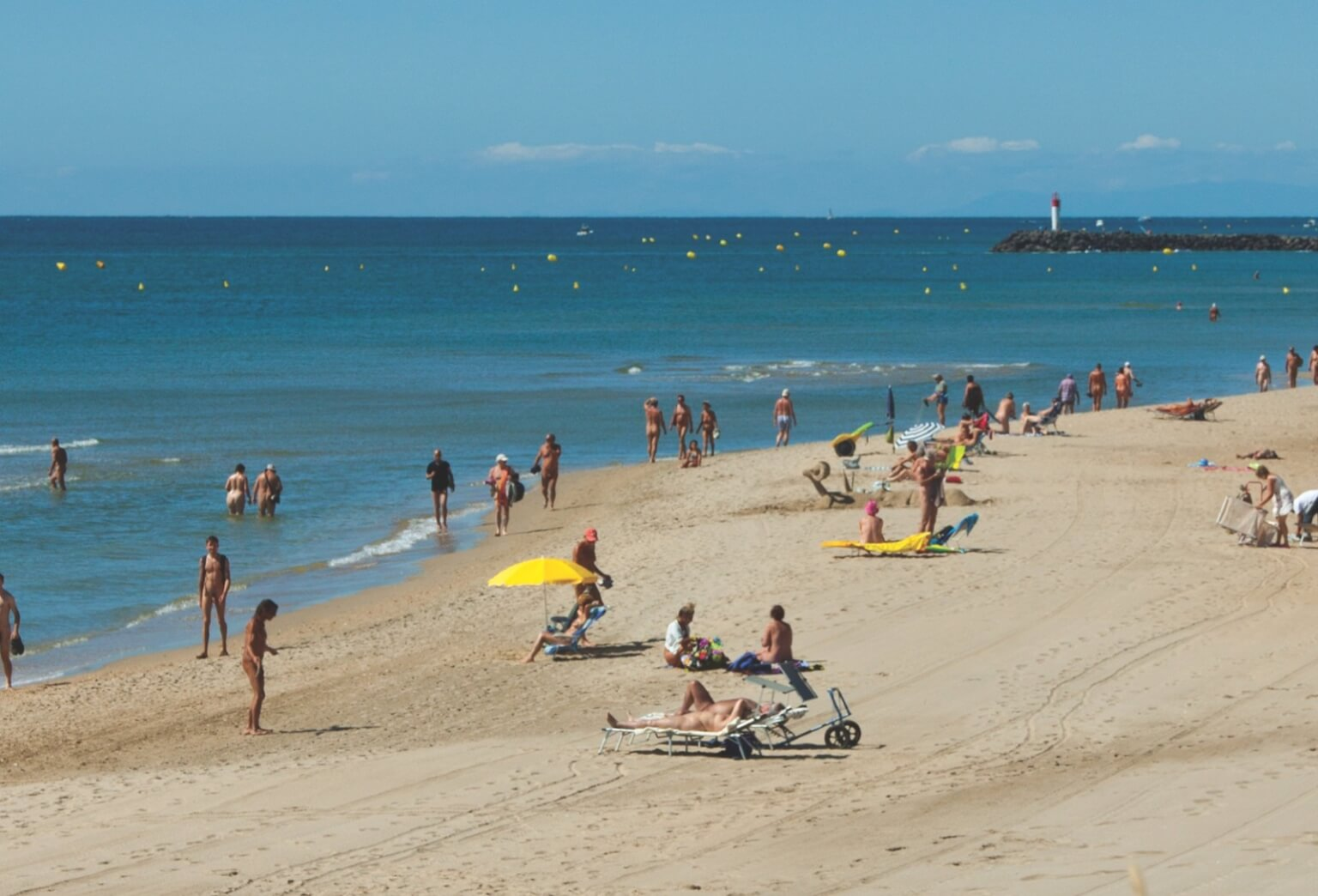
Nudist beach Oranjezon, Naturist beach in The Netherlands

Public saunas in the Netherlands are always mixed gender and nudity is the norm when using these. In the Netherlands tanning top free is legal on almost all beaches. Municipalities with a beach (usually including quiet parts) tend to have a nudist beach; even if the municipality does not like it, it designates a quiet part as such in order to be able to forbid nudity on the rest of the beach. A complete list of nude beaches in the Netherlands can be found on the Dutch-language website naaktstrandje.nl.

- Almere, Zilverstrand
- Amsterdamse Bos, Zonneweide (from 1 April to 30 September)
- Bussloo, longest nude beach in the Netherlands
- Bloemendaal aan Zee, nude beach at the north part of the beach
- Callantsoog, sandy beach 1.5 kilometres (0.93 mi) to the south - the oldest official nude beach in the country, dating from 1973
- Grote Plas in Delft, northeast side
- The Hague, Zuiderstrand, approx. 300 metres (980 ft) of sandy beach
- IJmuiden, nude beach at the south part of the beach
- Kijkduin, The Hague, two beaches
- Lake Gaasperplas near Amsterdam access Gaasperplas metro station.
- Noordwijk, North past sand dunes and World War II era bunkers
- Scheveningen, The Hague, sandy beach 1 km to the north
- Veluwse Bron wellness resort
- Vrouwenpolder, sandy beach.
- Zandvoort, sandy beach 2 kilometres (1.2 mi) to the south

=== Drenthe ===
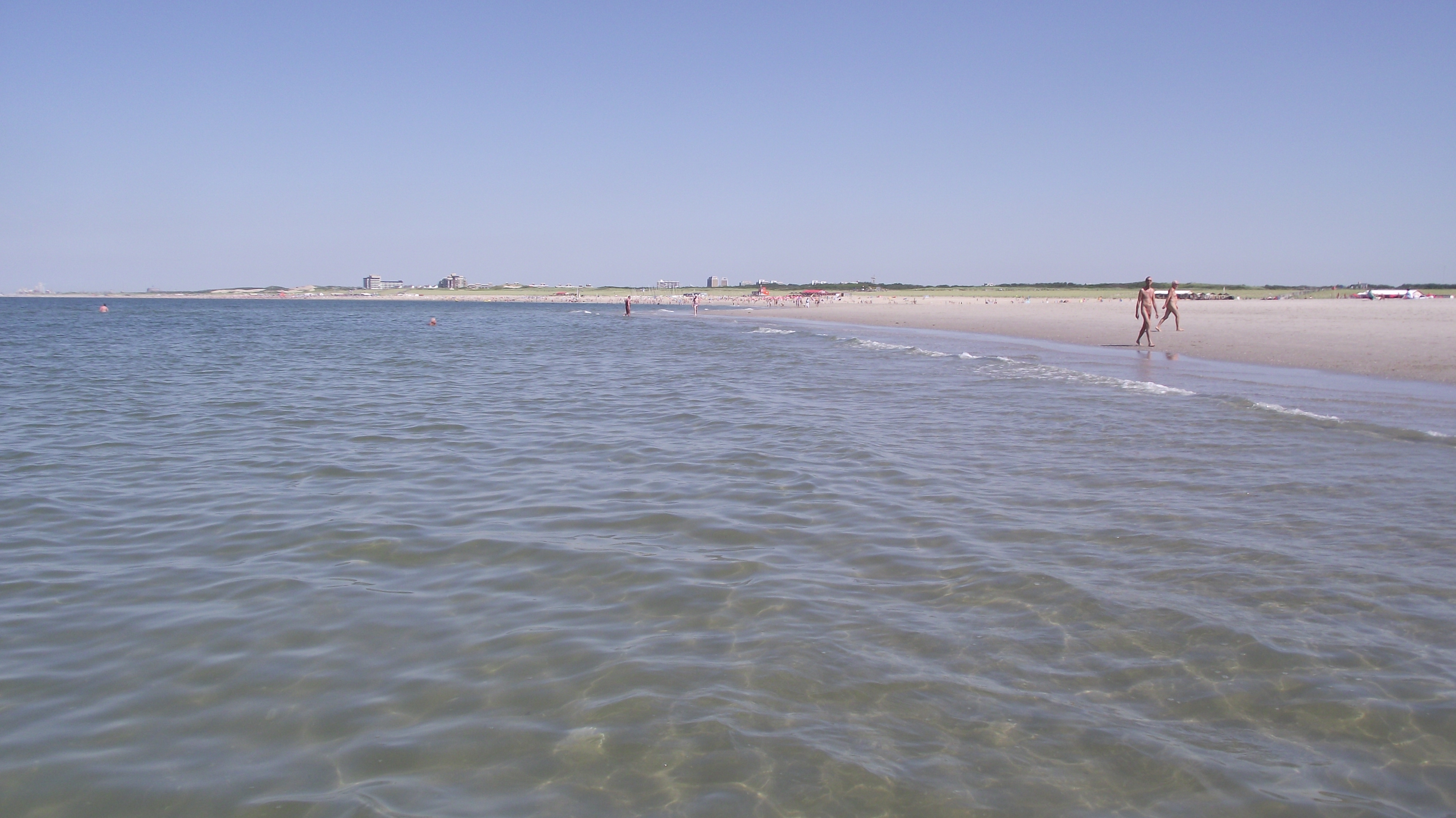
Zandmotor, naturist beach in The Netherlands

- Naturistencamping De Mierenhoop
- Naturistencamping Bargerhoek

=== Groningen ===
- Naturistencamping Bargerhoek

=== Friesland ===
- Naturistencamping Kuinderloo (vereniging Lotus)
- Naturistencamping De Appelhof

=== Overijssel ===
- Naturistencamping Balderhaar
- Naturistencamping De Krösenberg
- Naturistencamping NON Aamsveen
- Naturistencamping Ostana

=== Flevoland ===
- Naturistencamping Chamavi
- Naturistencamping De Vrijgaard

=== Gelderland ===
- Naturistencamping Gelre
- Naturistencamping De Maatn
- Naturistencamping De Scharf

=== Utrecht ===
- Naturistencamping De Birk
- Naturistencamping De Wilgenborgh
- De Vier Elementen
- Naturistenterrein Gravingen
- Maarsseveense Plassen

=== Noord-Holland ===
- Amsterdamse Lichtbond - De Molen (Ankeveen)
- De Vrije Vogels (Midwoud)
- Geminat - De Groote Keijns (Schagerbrug)
- Zon en Leven - Starnmeer (Starnmeer)

=== Zuid-Holland ===
- DNSV Goed Af - De Ammoniet (Dordrecht)
- Hellevoetsluis - De Brongaard (Hellevoetsluis)
- Navah - Abtswoudse Hoeve (Delft)
- Zon en Leven - Berkenwoude (Berkenwoude)
- Zuidhollandse Lichtbond - De Bessenhof (Reeuwijk)

=== Gelderland ===
- Gelre (Eerbeek)
- Zon en Leven - De Maat (Ravenswaaij)
- Zon en Leven - De Scharf (Varssel)

=== Limburg ===
- Atlanta (Geleen)
- NV Zuid - De Waterhoeven (Neeritter)
- Paluda (Weert)
- Vrij-Uit - De Ossendijk (Merselo)

=== Noord-Brabant ===
- Athena (Ossendrecht)
- De Grens - Parelmoer (De Moer)
- De Peelrand (Zeeland)
- Hart van Brabant (Tilburg)
- Heliantus (Nistelrode)
- Hertogstad - 't Vinkel (Rosmalen)
- Mens en Natuur - De Markeplaat (Zevenbergen)
- Zon en Leven - De Posthoek (Rucphen)
- Zon en Leven - Kuikseind (Middelbeers)
- Zonnelust - De Vaarselhof (Someren)

=== Zeeland ===
- Naturistencamping De Schoone Waardin (Ritthem)

== Norway ==
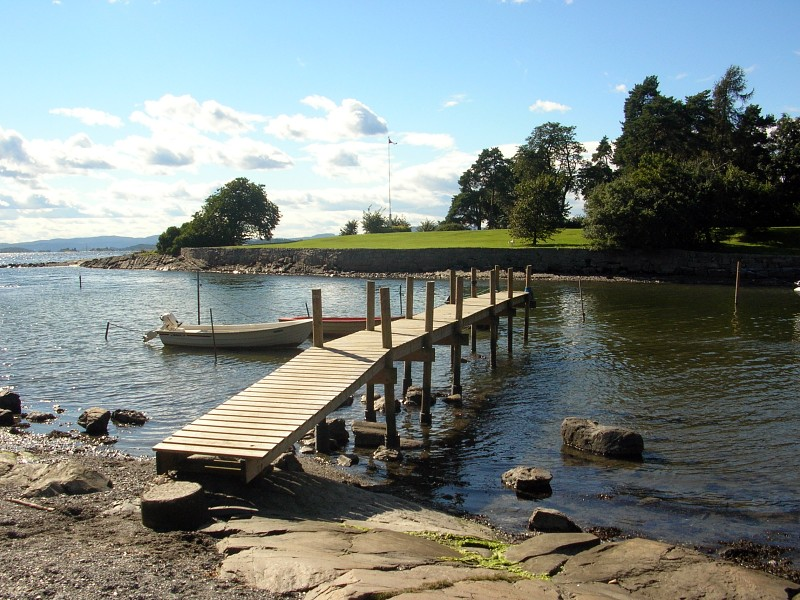
The beach at Huk

- In and around Oslo
  - Huk on the Bygdøy peninsula
  - the south east side of the islands Langøyene
  - Kalvøya in Bærum Municipality
  - Svartkulp near Sognsvann
  - Svartskog in Bunnefjorden.
  - The Well Spa, 15 km south of Oslo
- In and around Bergen
  - Kollevågen on the island of Askøy in Askøy Municipality
  - Rishamn in Bergen Municipality
- Sjøhaug Naturist Centre on Jeløya in Moss Municipality

== Poland ==
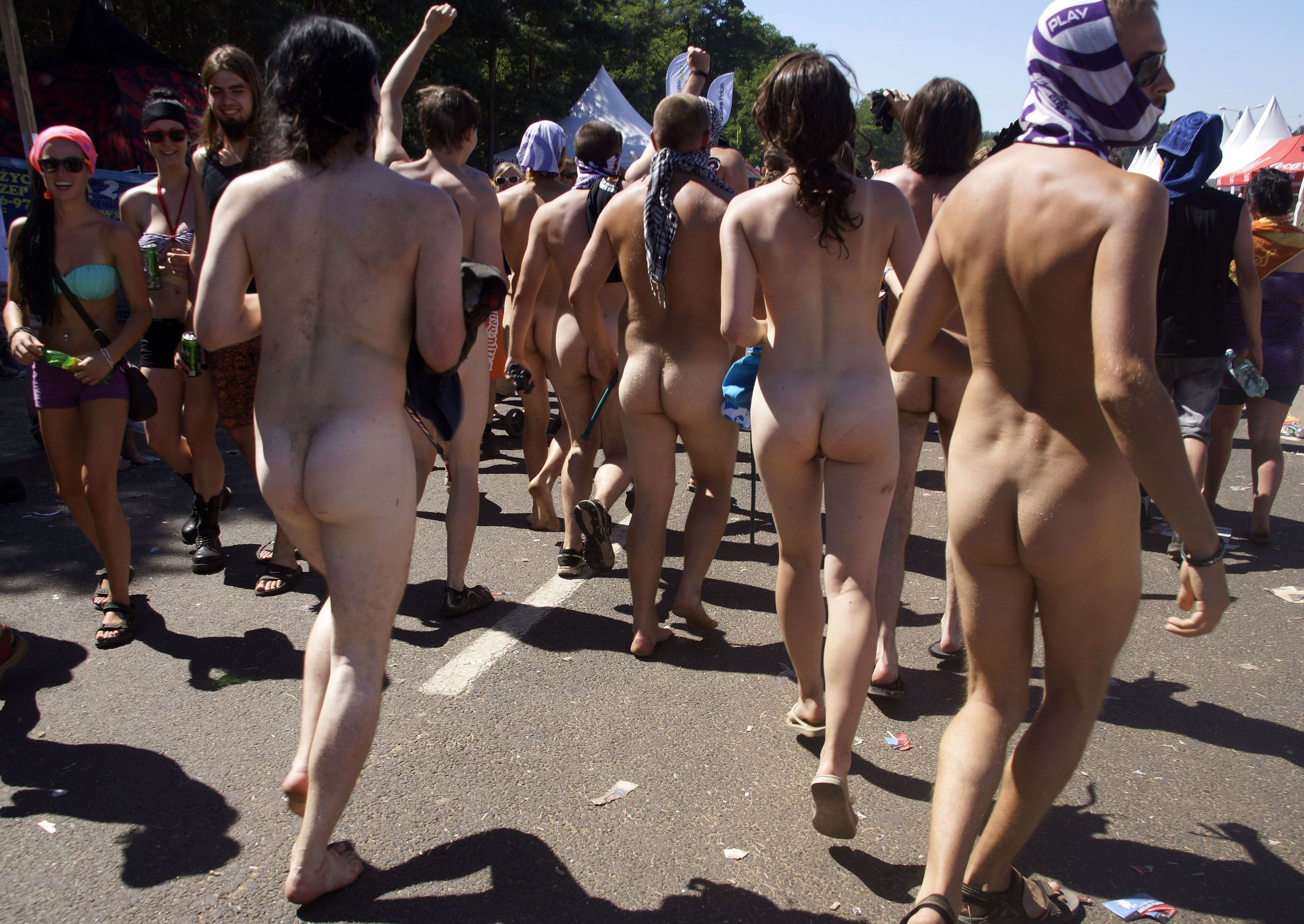
Woodstock Festival 2013 in Poland

Coastal nudist beaches	City/Gmina
Dębki	Gmina Krokowa
Pogorzelica	Pogorzelica

== Portugal ==
The Portuguese Naturism Federation "Federação Portuguesa De Naturismo" encompasses nudist beaches, clubs, and hotels.

- Barreta Island, Faro
- Cabanas Velhas beach near Lagos, Portugal, Algarve
- Duna Alta beach near Porto
- Ilha de Tavira in Algarve
- Praia da Adiça (Note: Location of Praia da Adiça 38°33′16″N 9°11′19″W) Costa da Caparica
- Praia da Afurada, Ferragudo
- Praia da Barreta Faro Algarve
- Praia da Bela Vista near Lisbon
- Praia da Costinha (Praia Naturista)
- Praia da Bordeira in Carrapateira (full nudity is acceptable beyond the popular area)
- Praia das Furnas, Odemira
- Praia das Pedras Negras in Marinha Grande, Leiria
- Praia de Adegas in Odeceixe, Algarve
- Praia de Trafal Quarteira Algarve
- Praia do Malhão Odemira, Alentejo
- Praia do Meco in Sesimbra near Lisbon
- Praia do Rei Cortiço near Obidos
- Praia do Salto near Porto Covo, Alentejo
- Praia dos Alteirinhos, Zambujeira do Mar
- Praia dos Pinheiros, Lagos, Algarve
- Praia Grande, Silves, Algarve
- Rio Alto Beach in Póvoa de Varzim, near Porto
- Ursa Beach, the westernmost beach in Mainland Europe near Cabo da Roca, Sintra

=== Grande Lisboa ===
- SPN - Sociedade Portuguesa de Naturalogia

=== Região do Centro ===
- CNC - Clube Naturista do Centro
- ANPaV - Associação Pensamentos ao Vento
- Praia da Costinha (Praia Naturista)

=== Região do Algarve ===
- CNA - Clube Naturista do Algarve

== Romania ==
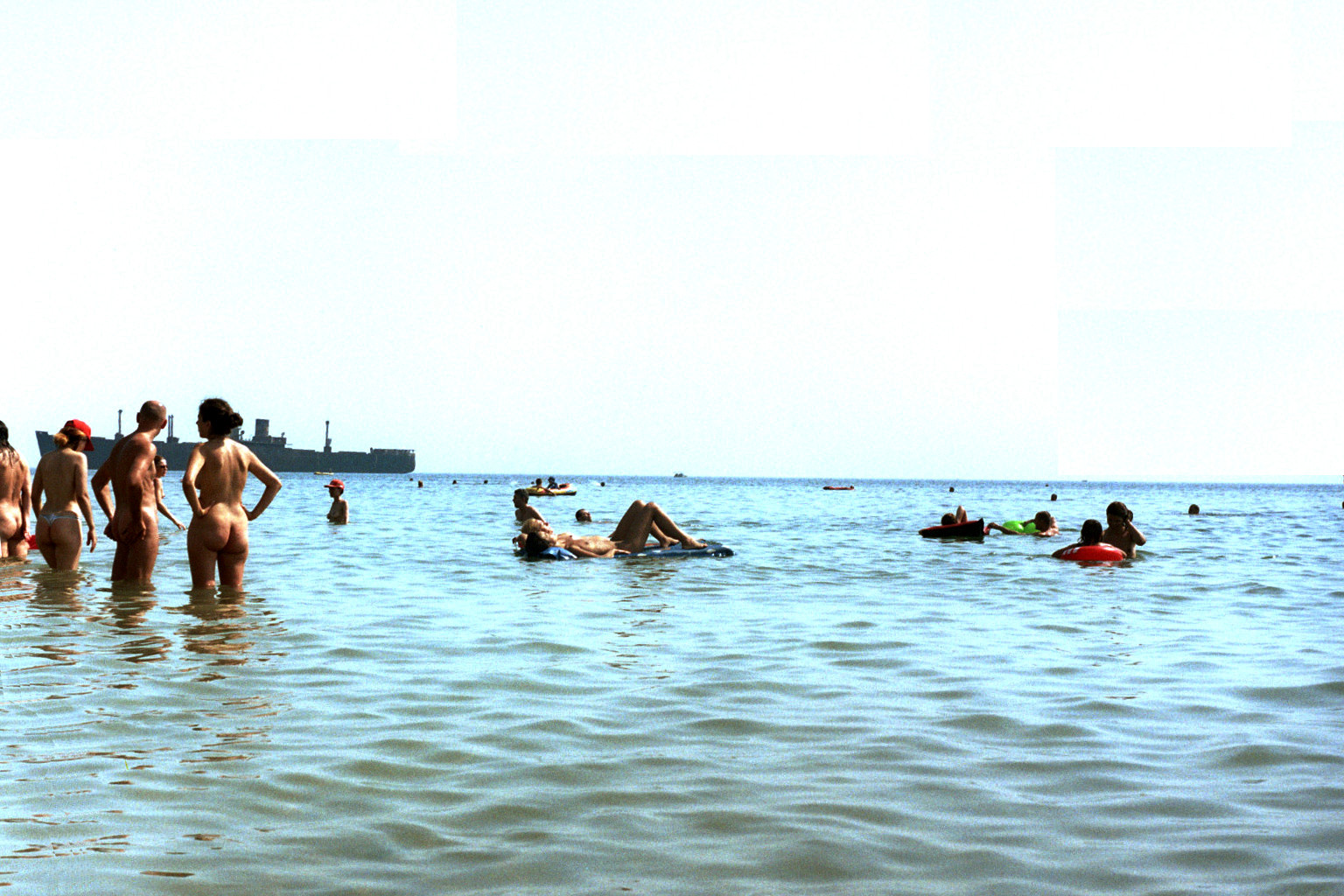
Bathers on the nudist beach at Costinești, with the wreck of the cargo ship MV E Evangelia in the background

Naturism is practiced in Romania, especially on the Black Sea coast, in areas known to the naturist community, but not officially developed. Among the most frequented are the "La Hamace" sector, between Eforie Nord and Eforie Sud, the portion of the French Gulf in Costinești, as well as the traditional areas of Vama Veche and 2 Mai.

The wild beaches of the Danube Delta (especially Corbu, Vadu and Tuzla) are favored by those seeking seclusion, but the complete lack of facilities and their unofficial status mean that the practice of naturism still depends on local tolerance.

== Russia ==
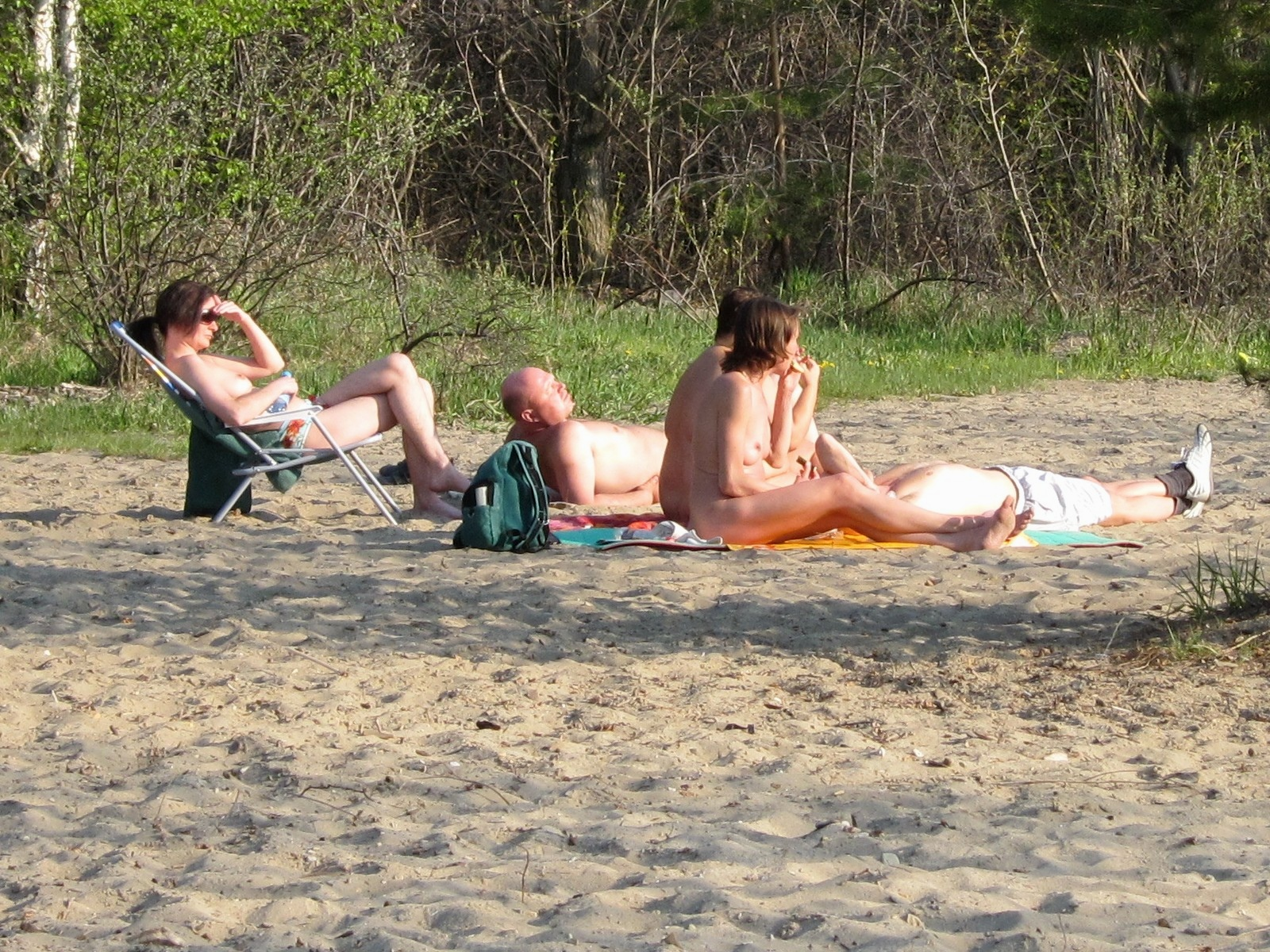
Unofficial nude beach at the Novosibirsk Reservoir, near Akademgorodok

- Divnomorskoe
- The Dunes Beach near Sestroretsk (north-west of St. Petersburg)
- Flyus Beach west of Yekaterinburg
- Loo (Sochi)
- Serebryanyi Bor (Moscow)
- Shershni (behind City beach of the Chelyabinsk)

== Serbia ==
- Kamenjar near Novi Sad has a nudist beach on the Danube
- Peskara near Zrenjanin, west part
- West part of Ada Ciganlija in Belgrade

== Slovakia ==
Social nudity places in Slovakia are listed on the website of the Asociácia Slovenských Naturistov (Association of Slovak Naturists), a member of the International Naturist Federation.

- Bajč
- Batizovce
- Bešeňová thermal park
- Bukovec (Košice) 48°42'1.97"N 21°9'38.50"E
- Čunovo
- Geča (Košice)
- Harčáš (Komárno)
- Liptovská Mara
- Nové Košariská
- Nové Mesto nad Váhom - Zelená Voda
- Ratnovská zátoka
- Rusovce
- Senec - štrkovisko u Slnečných jazier
- Šútovo
- Zlaté Piesky

== Slovenia ==
- Atlantis Water Park (Ljubljana)
- Banovci Spa (Banovci)
- Camp Dragočajna (Dragočajna)
- Camp Smlednik (Smlednik)
- Društvo Naturistov Mali Raj (Dolenje Polje)
- The Golden Club Tivoli (Ljubljana)
- Naturist Camp Mali Raj (Note: location of Mali Raj 45°46′18″N 15°03′06″E)
- Terme Lendava (Lendava)

== Spain ==
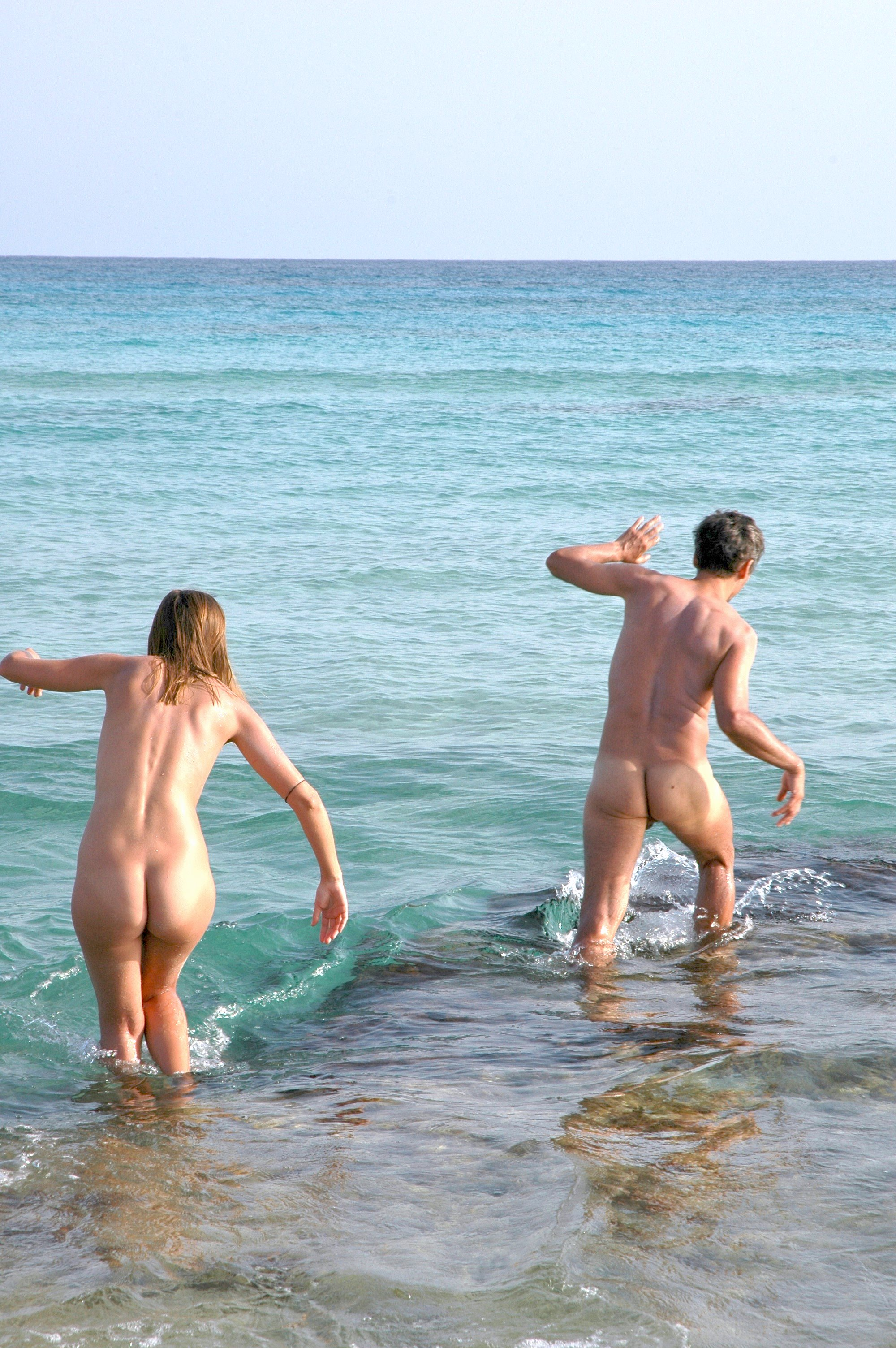
Swimmers enter the water at Formentera, 2007.

Public nudity on the beach is, in general, legal in Spain, however some local municipalities do outlaw nudity on beaches that are within city limits. The city of Cádiz is one example.

For nudity enthusiasts, Spain offers various options for nude sunbathing. In addition to the long sandy beaches in the vicinity of large cities, topless sunbathing is possible on all beaches, even in front of smaller villages.

Following a request by the Association for the Development of Naturism (ADN) an email was sent by the city of Madrid's sports department to the 21 district heads explaining that municipal pools, if they see fit, have authorization to organize a "Bathing Suit-Free Day", or an "Optional Bathing Suit Day", some time in the 2016 summer.

Female toplessness was officially legalized at the public pools of the municipalities of Galdakao and L'Ametlla del Vallès in March 2016 and June 2018, respectively.

=== Canary Islands ===
- On the island of Gran Canaria the following are some of the beaches where nudism is practised:
  - Aguadulce
- Charco del Palo on the island Lanzarote
  - El Confital
  - Guayedra
  - GüiGüi
- La Caleta on the two wild beaches (one sand, one rocky), over the cliffs to the north of the town on the island of Tenerife
  - Maspalomas
  - Medio Almud
  - Montaña de Arena
  - Tiritaña

=== Mainland (Peninsula and Balearic Islands) ===
There are hundreds of public nudist beaches in mainland Spain, all over the coast line, and some more inland. This is only a selection:

- Bolnuevo and El Portús, in Región de Murcia.
- El Fonoll in Catalonia
- Formentera (Balearic Islands)
- Mar Bella beach is the primary clothing optional beach for the city of Barcelona.
- Praia de Figueiras also known as "Praia dos Alemáns" on the Cíes Islands in Galicia.
- Vera Playa and Cabo de Gata beaches in Almería (province)

Although nudism is not illegal, some note that being nude on quieter or known clothing-optional beaches is less likely to cause bother to beachgoers.

== Sweden ==
In Sweden, it's common for saunas to be mixed gender and nudity is the norm there.

- Bohuslän:
  - Kattholmen: Unofficial nude beach at Saltö in Strömstad municipality.
  - Korsholmen: Unofficial nude beach on Koster in Strömstad municipality.* Gothenburg area:
  - Amundön: Official nude beach on the rocks of an island south of Gothenburg, between Askim and Billdal. (Note: Location of Amundön beach 57°35′15″N 11°54′8″E)
- Scania:
  - Solhejdans: Naturist camping site (Note: Location of Solhejdans Naturist camping 55°26′00″N 12°51′29″E)
  - Svanrevet: Official nudist beach on the Falsterbonäset peninsular located north of the marina of Skanör, just outside the town of Skanör med Falsterbo (Note: Location of Svanrevet beach 55°25′32″N 12°50′22″E)
- Stockholm area:
  - Ågesta Nude Beach: Official nude beach on Magelungen, maintained by NF EOS, the Scandinavian Naturalist Federation. Located about 10 km south of central Stockholm. (Note: Location of Ågesta Nude Beach 59°13′37″N 18°05′52″E)
  - Långholmen: Unofficial ("spontaneous") nude beach, located on the western end of Långholmen island. (Note: Location of Långholmen beach 59°19′17″N 18°00′56″E)
  - Källtorp Nude Beach: Unofficial ("spontaneous") nude beach, located about 6 km southeast of central Stockholm, on the southeastern end of Källtorp lake. (Note: Location of Källtorp Nude Beach 59°17′17″N 18°10′38″E) The beach is rocky and there are no public conveniences.
  - PGs Udde Nude Beach: Unofficial ("spontaneous") nude beach, located about 5 km southeast of central Stockholm, on the northern end of Källtorp lake (Note: Location of PGs Udde Nude Beach 59°17′39″N 18°09′33″E)
  - Saltsjöbadens friluftsbad: Public bath with two nude swimming outdoor sections, one for women and one for men. Located in Saltsjöbaden in Nacka Municipality.
  - Kärsön, unofficial clothing optional site in the southernmost part of the island with cliffs nearby the Drottningholm Royal Castle about 5 km northeast from stockholm city centre.
- Västerbotten:
  - Dragonudden: Official nudist beach in Umeå located in Stöcksjö just south of Umeå
  - Skibbikudden: Official nudist beach in Sorsele located just north of Sorsele

== Switzerland ==
Public nudity is generally legal in the entire country with the notable exception of the Canton of Appenzell Innerrhoden where public nudity, including naked hiking, carries a fine of up to 200 Swiss francs. Nude hiking is mainly popular in the sparsely populated alpine regions among nudists, less so in the low lands. Naturist ressorts, some of which are listed below, are rare or require membership. Nude bathing in public facilities is rarely allowed, with the notable exception of public saunas, which share the Scandinavian culture.

=== Canton of Genève ===
- Genève Naturisme

=== Canton of Neuchâtel ===
- Centre Naturiste Thielle

=== Canton of Vaud ===
- Camping Club Leman

=== Canton of Solothurn ===
- Heliosport

=== Canton of Zurich ===
- Natürlich Sitzberg
- Naspo
- Naturistengelände SonnenBad Schönhalde
- Rehwinkel

== United Kingdom ==
Public nudity is legal in England and Wales unless the intent is to cause "harassment, alarm or distress". However, many of the public are unaware of this and public nudity other than in an accepted venue may provoke a negative reaction. In 2019 the Crown Prosecution Service published a clarification to help police officers assess whether the law was being broken in cases of public nudity. In response the College of Policing created a decision aid for its officers.

Though nudity is legal everywhere the following is a list of sites where nudity is not queried by the general public.

=== England ===
==== Cornwall ====
- Carbeil Naturist Holiday Park
- Carlyon Bay – Polgaver Beach
- Downderry, (Note: Location of natrist beach near Downderry 50°21′37″N 4°20′29″W) South East Cornwall
- Flexbury Beach – Bude
- Gunwalloe (Note: Location of Gunwalloe naturist beach 50°03′46″N 5°17′13″W)
- Pedn Vounder Beach, Porthcurno
- Perranporth – Perran Beach
- Porth Kidney (Lelant)
- Porthluney Cove (part of the Caerhays Castle estate)
- Porthmeor beach near St Ives, Cornwall
- Porthzennor Cove near Zennor Head
- The Strangles
- Vault Beach near Gorran Haven

==== Devon ====
- Acorns Naturist Retreat, a naturist resort near Tiverton, Devon
- Weston Mouth, near Sidmouth, South Devon

==== Dorset ====
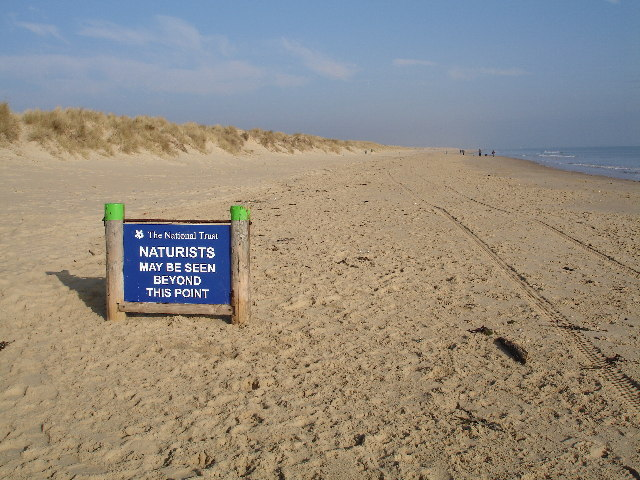
Studland Bay naturist beach, Dorset

- Ringstead Bay, Weymouth, Dorset
- Rivendell, a landed naturist club in Dorset (Note: Location of Rivendell 50°51′29″N 1°55′17″W)
- Studland Bay, Dorset - most famous UK nudist beach, now officially approved (after years of controversy) by landowner the National Trust

==== Hertfordshire ====
- British Naturism:Sun-Folk Society - naturist club near St Albans, Hertfordshire
- Diogenes Naturist Club near Maple Cross in Hertfordshire.
- Fiveacres Country Club, a naturist club in Bricket Wood, Hertfordshire.
- Spielplatz, Hertfordshire naturist resort accommodation, caravan and camping pitches near St Albans, Hertfordshire
- Watford naturist swimming club. A weekly naturist swimming session held at Watford Leisure Centre.

==== Other counties ====
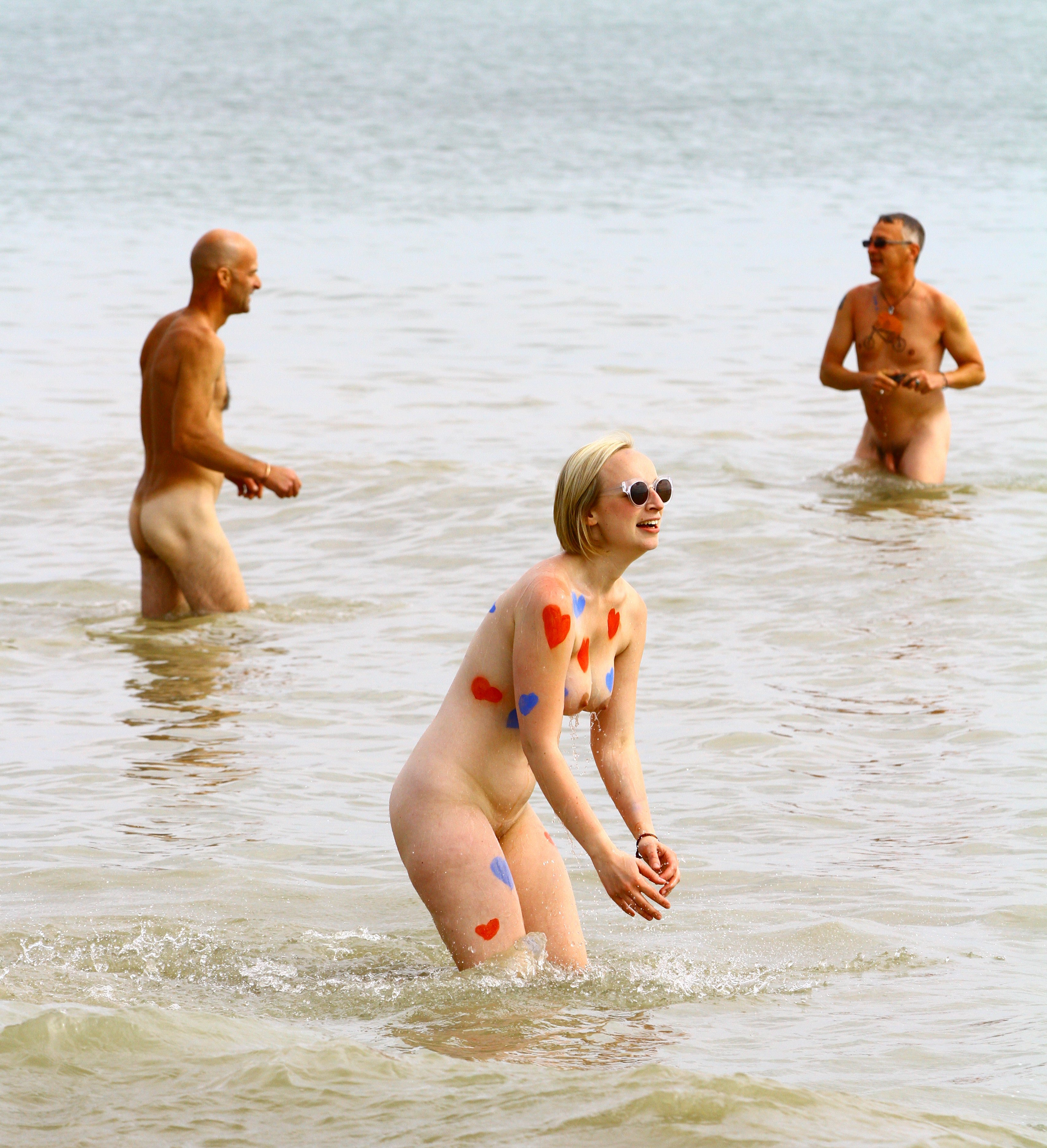
Skinny dipping in Brighton after the World Naked Bike Ride

- Ashdene Naturist Club, between Brighouse and Elland, West Yorkshire
- Birling Gap, between Eastbourne and Seaford, East Sussex
- Duke's Mound Beach (Note: Location of Duke's Mound Beach 50°48′53″N 0°06′59″W) in Brighton, East Sussex.
- Eastney Beach, Portsmouth, Hampshire
- Fairlight Glen, near Hastings, East Sussex
- Highgate Ponds, Hampstead Heath, London
- Hill Head Beach, (Note: Location nudist section of Hill Head Beach 50°49′21″N 1°15′19″W) Stubbington, Hampshire (below cliffs, quarter mile west of beach huts near Titchfield Haven)
- Holkham Beach, Norfolk
- Lakeside Farm Lincolnshire, naturist resort low cost accommodation, caravan and camping pitches near Skegness
- Leysdown East Beach, Isle of Sheppey, North Kent
- Morecambe Bay Naturist Club, ten miles north of Lancaster and less than a mile from Morecambe Bay
- Newnham Riverbank club, Cambridge, Cambridgeshire & the adjoining field
- St Osyth, near Clacton-on-Sea, Essex
- Western Sunfolk near Monmouth

=== Wales ===
- Cefn Sidan
- Kenfig Burrows
- Marros Sands
- Morfa Dyffryn, between Barmouth and Harlech, Gwynedd
- Newborough Warren beach
- Tything Barn, Pembrokeshire, West Wales
- Whiteford Sands

=== Scotland ===
- Ardeer, North Ayrshire, Firth of Clyde
- Isle of Arran, Firth of Clyde

== Sources ==
- Bousfield, Jonathan; Richardson, Dan (2002). Bulgaria. Rough Guides. ISBN 978-1-85828-882-6.
- McLellan, Josie (2011). Love in the Time of Communism: Intimacy and Sexuality in the GDR. Cambridge University Press. ISBN 978-0-521-89891-1.
