= Naturism in Portugal =

Lifestyle of living without clothing in Portugal

Organised naturism in Portugal existed from around 1920, but was suppressed until 25 April 1974. The Federação Portuguesa de Naturismo, or Portuguese Naturist Federation (FPN) was founded on March 1st, 1977, at a meeting in Lisbon. The oldest and most representative club in the Portuguese Naturist Federation is the Clube Naturista do Centro, founded on 20 November 1988.

== History ==
Naturism in Portugal had its first historical record around 1920, linked to Portuguese Naturist Society, of which the anarcho-syndicalist José Peralta was a prominent member. Social nudity was already being practiced on the beaches of Costa de Caparica. With the development of the dictatorial regime, the naturist movement was limited to vegetarian and alternative medicines, since nudity was banned, and associated with the crime of "indecency". Only after the end of the dictatorial regime on 25 April 1974, the activities linked to the practice of nudity were resumed.

The FPN – “Federação Portuguesa de Naturismo” (Portuguese Naturist Federation) – was founded on 1 March 1977 at a meeting in Lisbon.

After its foundation the FPN applied to join INF/FNI-International Naturist Federation, which was then represented in Portugal by the Portuguese Vegetarian Association, which succeeded “Sociedade Portuguesa de Naturalogia” in this task. The FPN was admitted to the International Federation in October 1977 and attended its World Congress, in the following year, already entitled with a right to vote.

FPN immediately started to establish contacts at the highest level, focusing in the development of legal practice in Portugal. For this purpose, a meeting was held the day after its founding with the then-Secretary of State for tourism .

In its continuous struggle for the recognition of naturism, in 1988, only a little more than a decade of various contacts, campaigns, advances and setbacks, the FPN managed to see the first Naturist Law in Portugal discussed and approved at the Portuguese Parliament.

FPN is the only accredited federation in Portugal for the issuing of the "naturist identity card", useful and necessary to all who wish to join, with advantages in "naturist world" and in the diversity of their national and international offer.

== Facilities ==
The Portuguese Naturist Federation became the coordinating entity of the naturist activity in Portugal since 1998, federating several clubs and associations, maintaining specialty cores and organizing some activities aimed preferably at its federated members, without forgetting the essential role of promoting a naturist practice in order to develop the physical and mental health of the human being, in particular, through natural means, favoring its integration in nature.

Over the past 44 years, the FPN has achieved important "goals" that constitute a reference landmarks for all naturists. Some examples are: the laws 92/88, 29/94 and 53/10, the recognized official beaches of Meco, Bela Vista, Ilha de Tavira (Barril), Salto, Adegas, Alteirinhos and Deserta, the opening of the first naturist activity in a council swimming pool and in a health club, and the support given to the development of infrastructures of tourist accommodation, like the campsites "Monte Barão" and "Quinta do Maral" and "Terra Nua".

== See also ==
- List of beaches in Portugal
- List of social nudity places in Europe
- Naturism
