= Pleschinger See =

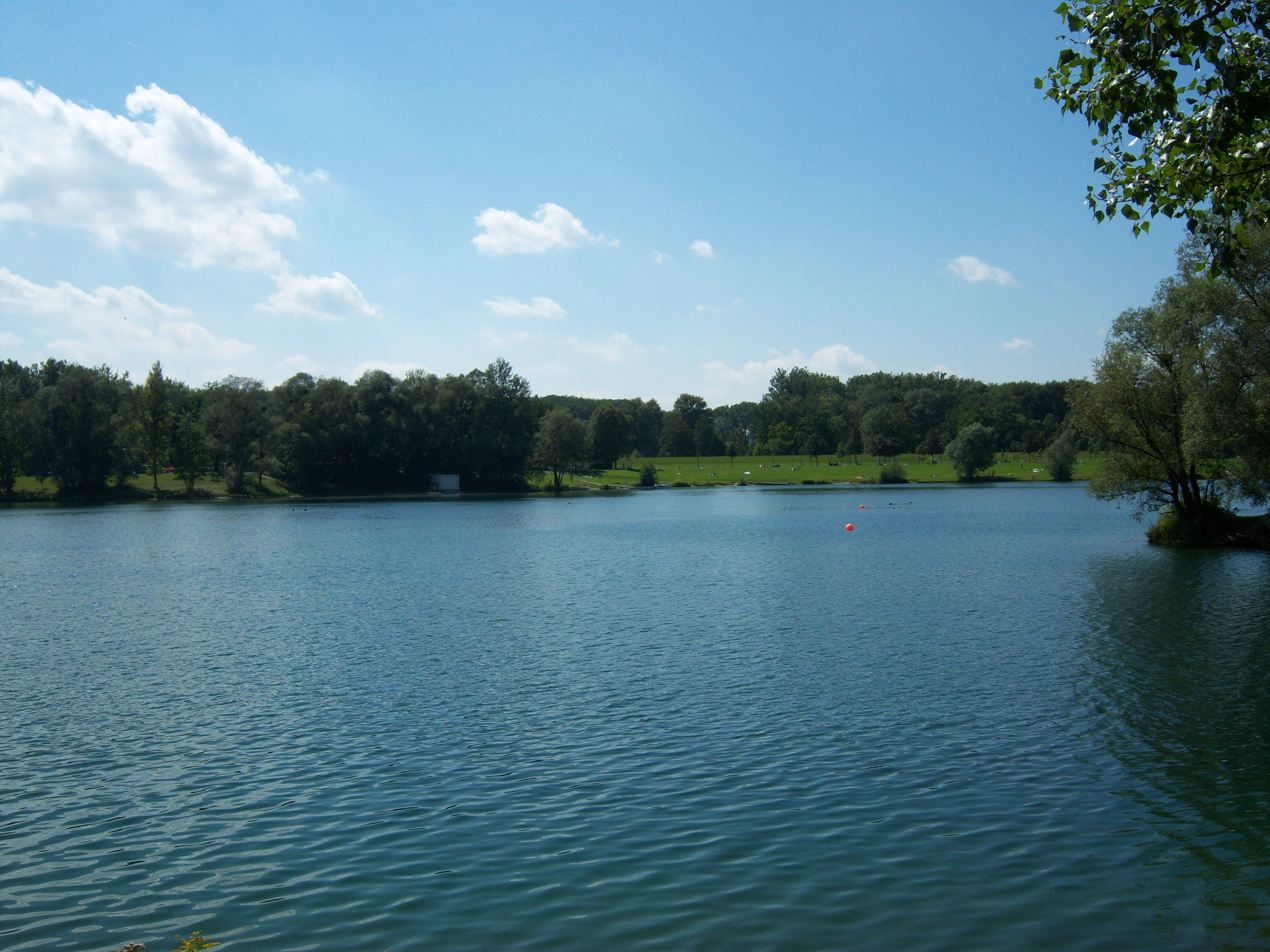

- Location within Austria
- Location: Steyregg, Urfahr-Umgebung District, Upper Austria, Austria
- Coordinates: 48°19′09″N 14°19′57″E
- Type: Lake

Pleschinger See is a lake of Upper Austria.

The Pleschinger See is a recreational area located in the northwest of the municipality Steyregg, Upper Austria. It encompasses the lake, the green belt with various parking lots, restaurants and takeaways, as well as playgrounds, camping and a small garden since 2004. For nudists, there is a separate nudist area since 29 May 1982 at the lake. Due to its location directly adjacent to the city border to Linz it is often used by the people of Linz.
