= Weikerlsee =

Two lakes in Upper Austria

- Big Weikerlsee
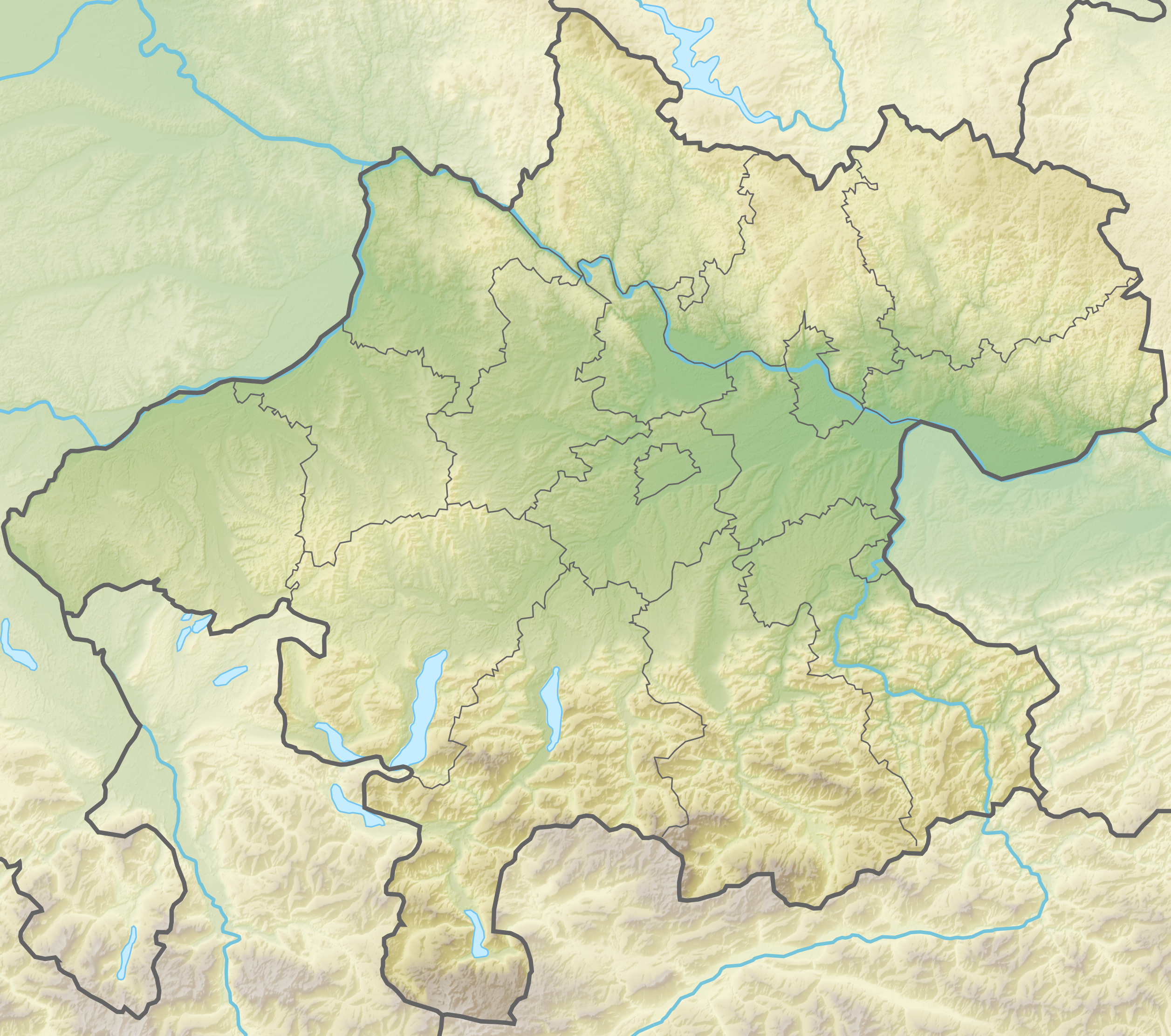
- Location within Upper Austria
- Location: Austria
- Coordinates: 48°15′52″N 14°22′15″E

Small Weikerlsee
- Small Weikerlsee
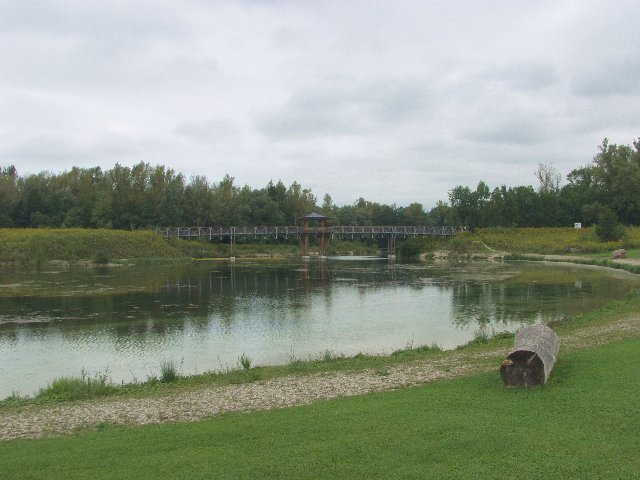
- Small Weikerlsee on a autumnal morning

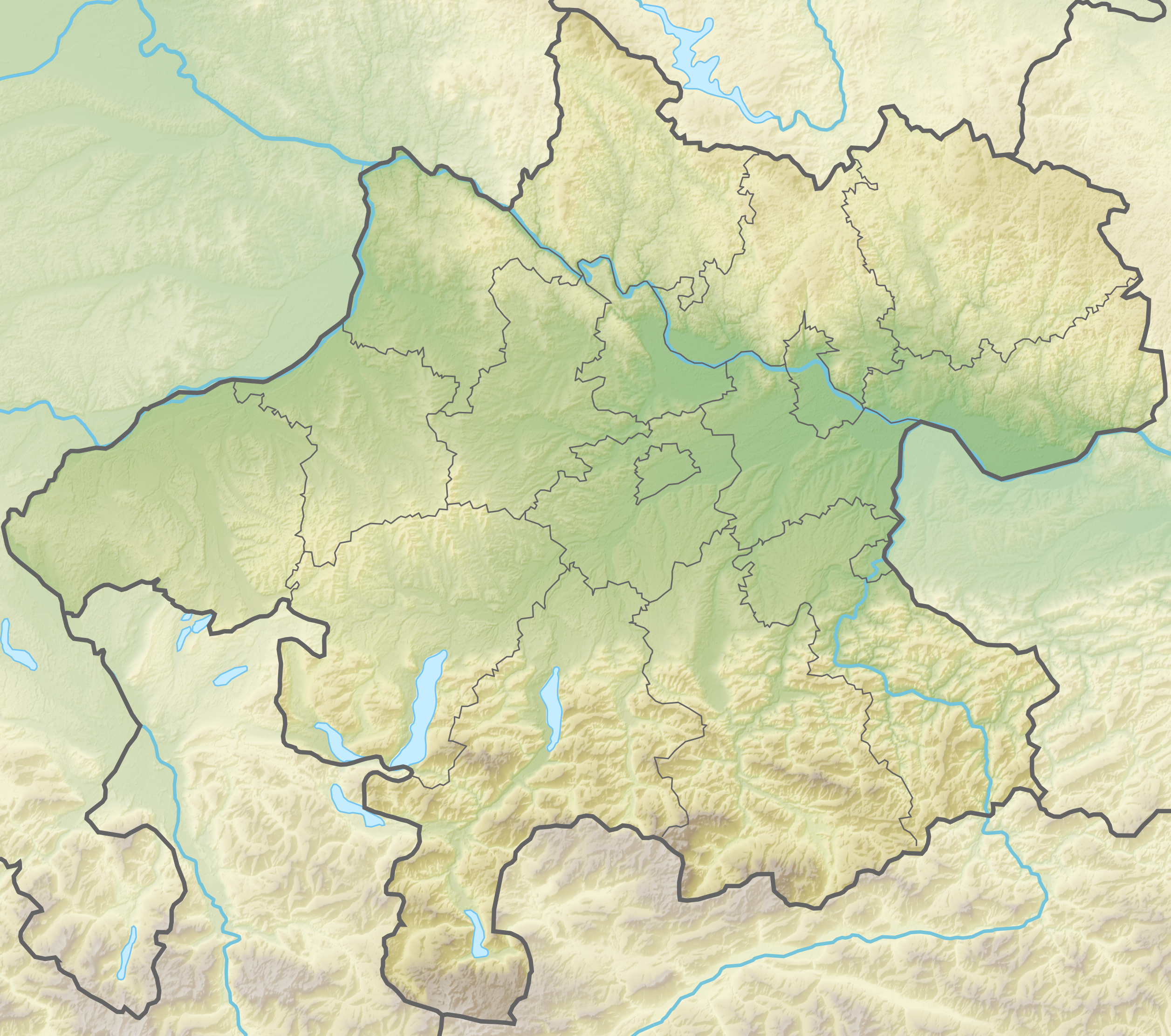
- Location within Upper Austria
- Location: Austria
- Coordinates: 48.264°N 14.361°E

Weikerlsee is a pair of recreational lakes just south of the confluence of the Traun and the Danube in the urban district of Ebelsberg in Austria. It includes the bathing lake, a green belt, some parking spaces, toilets, a snack bar and a nudist area on the north bank of the smaller of the two lakes. A canal joins the smaller and the larger lakes. To the south of the Larger Weiklsee are the rainwater drainage basins for the Linz sewage network.

== Recreational use ==
The two lakes have a combined water surface of 21 hectares (52 acres). The larger lake is 7 metres (23 ft) lower than the smaller lake.

The smaller lake was enlarged at the beginning of the 21st century. A bridge with a viewing platform separates the northern nudist area from the southern textile beach. On the south bank is a snack bar with toilets. Bathing is strictly forbidden in the larger lake because it is a nature reserve. Both lakes have a low water temperature due to the groundwater sources.
