= Saltö =

Island in Blekinge, Sweden

Coordinates: 56.166667°N 15.566667°E

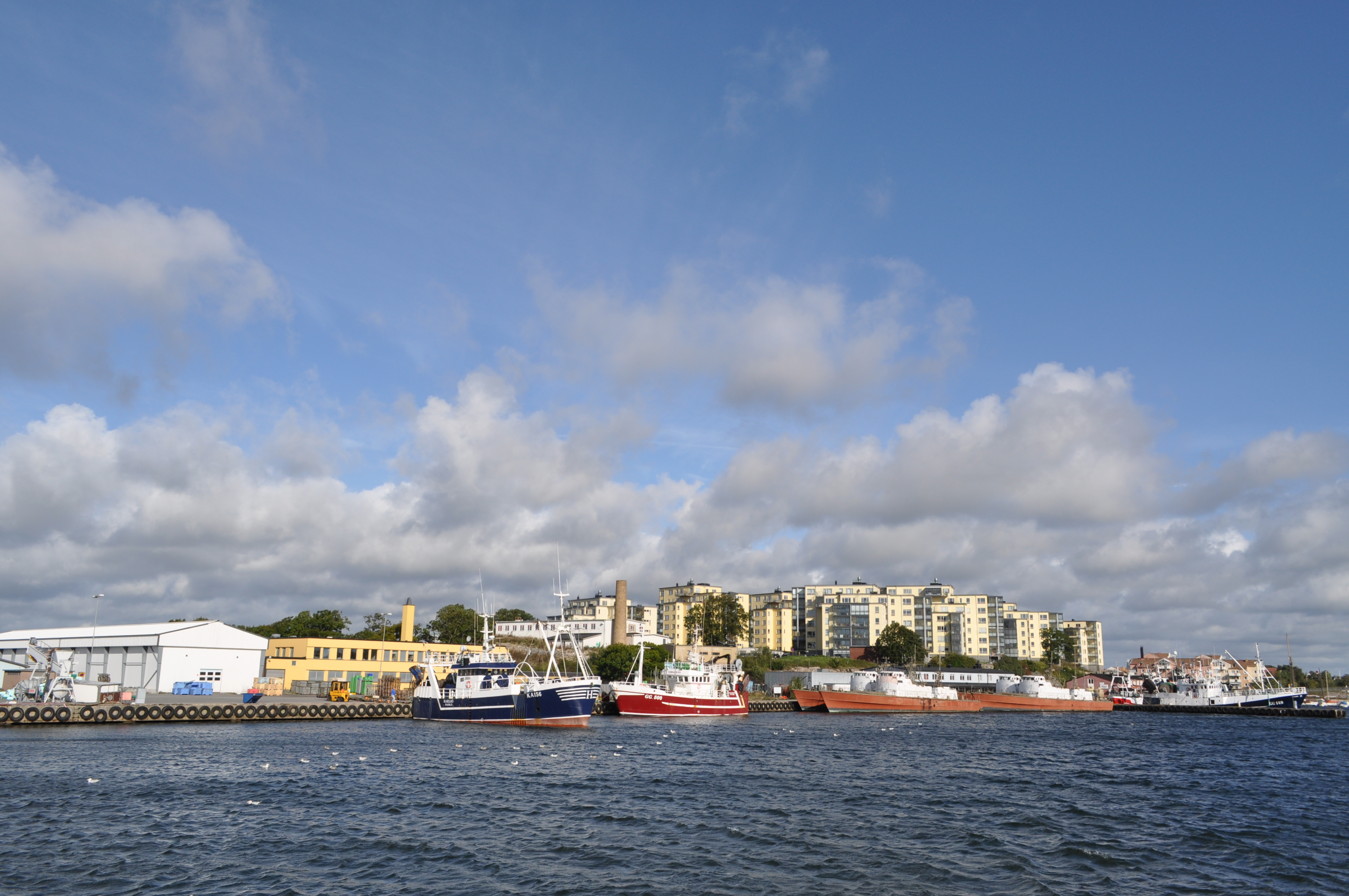
Island Saltö with the fishing-harbour, Karlskroma

Saltö is an island in the eastern part of the Blekinge archipelago in Blekinge Län, southern Sweden. The city of Karlskrona is spread over 30 islands, one of which is Saltö. Dragsöviken is the sound between Saltö and Dragsö.
