= Rishavn =

Beach in Vestland county, Norway

Rishavn Rishamn (unofficial)
- Beach
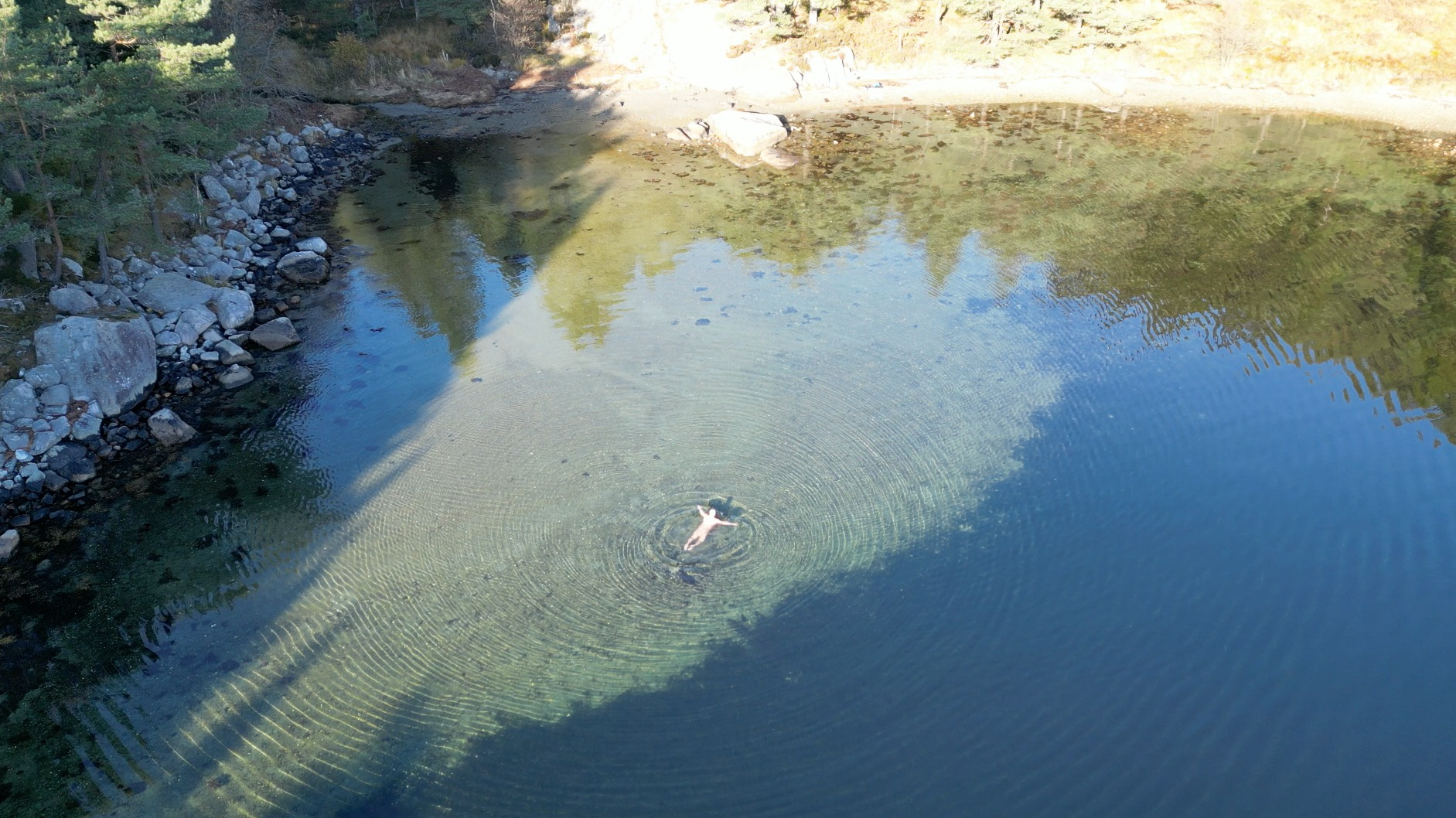
- View of the beach.
- Interactive map of Rishavn
- Coordinates: 60.21479°N 5.28511°E
- Location: Vestland, Norway
- Offshore water bodies: Lysefjorden

Rishavn is a beach in Bergen Municipality in Vestland county, Norway. The beach is located on the Korsneset peninsula just outside the village of Krokeide in the borough of Fana, about 25 kilometres (16 mi) south of the centre of the city of Bergen. The beach is mostly used by naturists.
