= SUN BEAM (tournament) =

Beach ultimate frisbee tournament

SUN BEAM tournament official logo

SUN BEAM – is Lithuanian beach ultimate tournament organized in coastal city Klaipėda beach - Smiltynė. Currently it is the biggest beach Ultimate tournament among the Baltic States. The first tournament was played in 2011. Tournament annually takes place at middle of July in unique stretch of land - "Curonian Spit", which is UNESCO heritage site.

Event gathers the most ultimate teams from Baltic States (Lithuania, Latvia, Estonia), Belarus, Poland, Russia, Finland.

== Description ==
SUN BEAM tournament is being played according to official beach (5 on 5) ultimate tournament rules.

Tournament system: robin round games that advances to playoffs.

- Open and Mixed divisions
- Time cap: 45 minutes
- Point cap: 13 points

== Results ==
Year	Division	Game for 1st place			Game for 3rd place			SOTG
Year	Division	Gold	Result	Silver	Bronze	Result	4th place	SOTG
2011	Open	Skraidantys drambliai (Lithuania)	15–8	Taškas (Lithuania)	Briliantais sninga (Lithuania)	12–10	Marių Meškos (Lithuania)	ZERO (Lithuania)
2011	Mixed	Sexylegs (Estonia)	16–6	Mixtūra (Lithuania)	The Ideal Condition/RSU (Latvia)	8–7	Greens (Belarus)	Sexylegs (Estonia)
2012	Open	Marių Meškos (Lithuania)	13–9	Skraidantys drambliai (Lithuania)	Taškas (Lithuania)	12–5	Man patik ziedi (Latvia)	Man patik ziedi (Latvia)
2012	Mixed	Vorai (Lithuania)	12–5	i-Free (Russia)	Ultimate Decision (Latvia)	9–8	Marių Meškos (Lithuania)	The Monsters (United Kingdom)
2013	Open	Skraidantys drambliai (Lithuania)	12–11	Outlawz Ultimate (Latvia)	6qdn (Finland)	13–12	Goldfingers (Germany)	6qdn (Finland)
2013	Mixed	Marių Meškos (Lithuania)	14–7	Vorai (Lithuania)	Ultimate Decision (Latvia)	13–9	Double Z (Lithuania)	Marių Meškos (Lithuania)
2014	Open	Marių Meškos (Lithuania)	11–8	Skraidantys drambliai (Lithuania)	Velniai (Lithuania)	9–8	KossMix (Lithuania)	KossMix (Lithuania)
2014	Mixed	Marių Meškos (Lithuania)	12–8	Vorai (Lithuania)	Zawierucha (Poland)	6–3	Phoenix (Belarus)	Marių Meškos (Lithuania)
2015	Open	Salaspils WT (Latvia)	13–6	Skraidantys drambliai (Lithuania)	Dundee (Scotland)	11–9	Sirocco Ultimate (Latvia)	Dundee (Scotland)
2015	Mixed	Vorai (Lithuania)	10–7	Salaspils Jr. (Latvia)	Marių Meškos (Lithuania)	12–3	KossMix (Lithuania)	Ultimate Decision (Latvia)
2016	Open	Skyline (Netherlands)	11–7	Ultimaniacs (Latvia)	Das Nich Team (Switzerland)	11–8	Skraidantys drambliai (Lithuania)	Babel (Europe)
2016	Mixed	Salaspils FK (Latvia)	11–9	Vorai (Lithuania)	Sirocco Ultimate (Latvia)	13–10	Drop That Smile (Lithuania)	Salaspils FK (Latvia)
2017	Open	Skraidantys drambliai (Lithuania)	13–9	Ulmost Dead (Latvia)	Marių Meškos (Lithuania)	13–2	Auksinės lapės (Lithuania)	Marių Meškos (Lithuania)
2017	Mixed	Saku Ultimate (Estonia)	13–11	Vorai (Lithuania)	Sirocco Ultimate (Latvia)	13–5	Pils pie Venta (Latvia)	Sirocco Breeze (Latvia)
2018	Mixed	Salaspils FK (Latvia)	8–4	Vorai (Lithuania)	Ultimate Saku (Estonia)	8–4	Ventspils FK (Latvia)	Fulham Flyers Sand (England)
2019	Mixed	Ventspils Frisbee Club (Latvia)	8–6	Frequent Flyers (Europe)	Witches and Muggles (Ukraine)	8–7	Ultimate Saku (Estonia)	Frequent Flyers (Europe)
