= Swan Lake (disambiguation) =

Swan Lake is a ballet by Russian composer Pyotr Ilyich Tchaikovsky.

Swan Lake may also refer to:

== Arts ==
=== Ballet ===
- Swan Lake (1895), Imperial Ballet in St. Petersburg, Russia; the version on which many companies base their stagings, both choreographically and musically
- Swan Lake (Balanchine), a 1951 one-act ballet produced by George Balanchine
- Swan Lake (Bourne), a 1995 ballet produced by Matthew Bourne

=== Film ===
- Swan Lake (1981 film), an animated film directed by Hirokazu Fuse

=== Music ===
- Swan Lake (band), a Canadian indie supergroup
- "Swan Lake" (The Cats song), a 1968 hit by The Cats
- Swan Lake, alternate title for "Death Disco", a 1979 song by Public Image Ltd.

== Places ==
=== Canada ===
- Swan Lake 29, a First Nations reserve in Kenora District, Ontario
- Swan Lake (Manitoba), a lake in Division No. 19, Manitoba
- Swan Lake, Manitoba, a community in the Rural Municipality of Lorne
- Swan Lake (Okanagan), a lake in the Southern Interior of British Columbia
- Swan Lake (Saanich), a district municipality on Vancouver Island in British Columbia
- Swan Lake (Timiskaming District), a lake in Lee and Maisonville Townships
- Swan Lake Provincial Park, a provincial park in British Columbia
- Mont du Lac des Cygnes (Swan Lake Mountain), a mountain in Charlevoix, Quebec

=== United States ===
==== Lakes and wetlands ====
- Swan Lake (Alaska), in the town of Sitka
- Swan Lake, a lake in Crittenden County, Arkansas
- Swan Lake, a lake in Cross County, Arkansas
- Swan Lake, four different lakes in Desha County, Arkansas
- Swan Lake, a lake in Jefferson County, Arkansas
- Swan Lake, a lake in Lafayette County, Arkansas
- Swan Lake, a lake in Lonoke County, Arkansas
- Swan Lake, a lake in Mississippi County, Arkansas
- Little Swan Lake, Warren County, Illinois
- Swan Lake (Carroll County, Iowa)
- Swan Lake (Emmet County, Iowa)
- Swan Lake (Kentucky), Ballard County
- Swan Lake (Maine), Waldo County
- Swan Lake (Nicollet County, Minnesota)
- Swan Lake (Montana), Bigfork, Montana
- Swan Lake National Wildlife Refuge, Chariton County, Missouri
- Swan Lake Nature Study Area, Lemmon Valley, Nevada
- Swan Lake (New York), the source of the Swan River on Long Island
- Swan Lake/Iris Gardens, Sumter, South Carolina
- Swan Lake (South Dakota), Turner County
- A few other lakes in South Dakota

==== Inhabited places ====
- Swan Lake, Mississippi, an unincorporated community in Tallahatchie County, Mississippi, United States
- Swan Lake, Montana, an unincorporated community in Lake County, Montana, United States
- Swan Lake, New York, a hamlet in Sullivan County
- Swan Lake, Tulsa, a historic district in Tulsa, Oklahoma
- Swan Lake Township, Emmet County, Iowa
- Swan Lake Township, Stevens County, Minnesota

=== Other places ===
- Swan Lake, in Yerevan, Armenia
- Swan Lake (New Zealand)
- Swan Lake (Singapore), Singapore Botanic Gardens
- Swan Lake Station (天鹅湖站, Tian'e Hu zhan), a station on the Linhe–Ceke railway in Inner Mongolia
- Schwansen, in Schleswig-Holstein, Germany
- Swan Lake, Curonian Spit National Park (Russia)

== See also ==
- Barbie of Swan Lake, a 2003 CGI animated film
- Swan Lake, 1989 children's book by Mark Helprin
- Swan Lake, 1999 manga book by Higuchi Tachibana
- Swan Princess (disambiguation)
  - The Swan Princess, a 1994 animated film based on the ballet Swan Lake
- Swanlake, Idaho, an unincorporated community in Bannock County, Idaho, U.S.
