= Bulrush (disambiguation) =

Bulrush or bullrush is a common name for any of several wetland plants, mostly in the sedge family, Cyperaceae.

Bulrush may also refer to:

- HMS Bullrush (K307), former name of HMCS Mimico (K485)
- Bullrush (game), a variation of the tag and running game British Bulldog
- "Bull-Rush", a song by Paul Weller from the 1992 album Paul Weller
- Bullrush, one of eleven Reedling keelboats
- Bullrush, a technique by mixed martial artist Bob Sapp

== See also ==
- Ark of bulrushes, in which the infant Moses was found
- Task Force Bullrush, a task force led by the 15th Marine Expeditionary Unit in Iraq in 2006 and 2007
- Bulrush Lake (disambiguation)
