= Curonian Spit National Park =

Curonian Spit National Park might refer to one of the national parks on the Curonian Spit:

- Curonian Spit National Park (Lithuania) in the north
- Curonian Spit National Park (Russia) in the south
