= Swan Lake (New Zealand) =

Lake in the Northland Region of New Zealand

Northern Swan Lake
- Location within Northland Region Location within New Zealand
- Location: Northland Region, North Island
- Coordinates: 34°44′55″S 173°00′00″E
- Basin countries: New Zealand

Southern Swan Lake
- Location within Northland Region Location within New Zealand
- Location: Northland Region, North Island
- Coordinates: 34°54′23″S 173°08′50″E
- Basin countries: New Zealand

Swan Lake is the name of two lakes in the Northland Region of New Zealand.

The northern Swan Lake is located at 34°44′55″S 173°00′00″E on the northern Aupouri Peninsula west of Ngataki in an area of low-lying land which is also the location of Lake Half and Bulrush Lake.

The southern Swan Lake is located at 34°54′23″S 173°08′50″E on the southern Aupouri Peninsula northwest of Rangaunu Harbour and west of Waihuahua Swamp.

== See also ==
- List of lakes in New Zealand
