= Curonian weathervane =

Weathervane in Lithuania

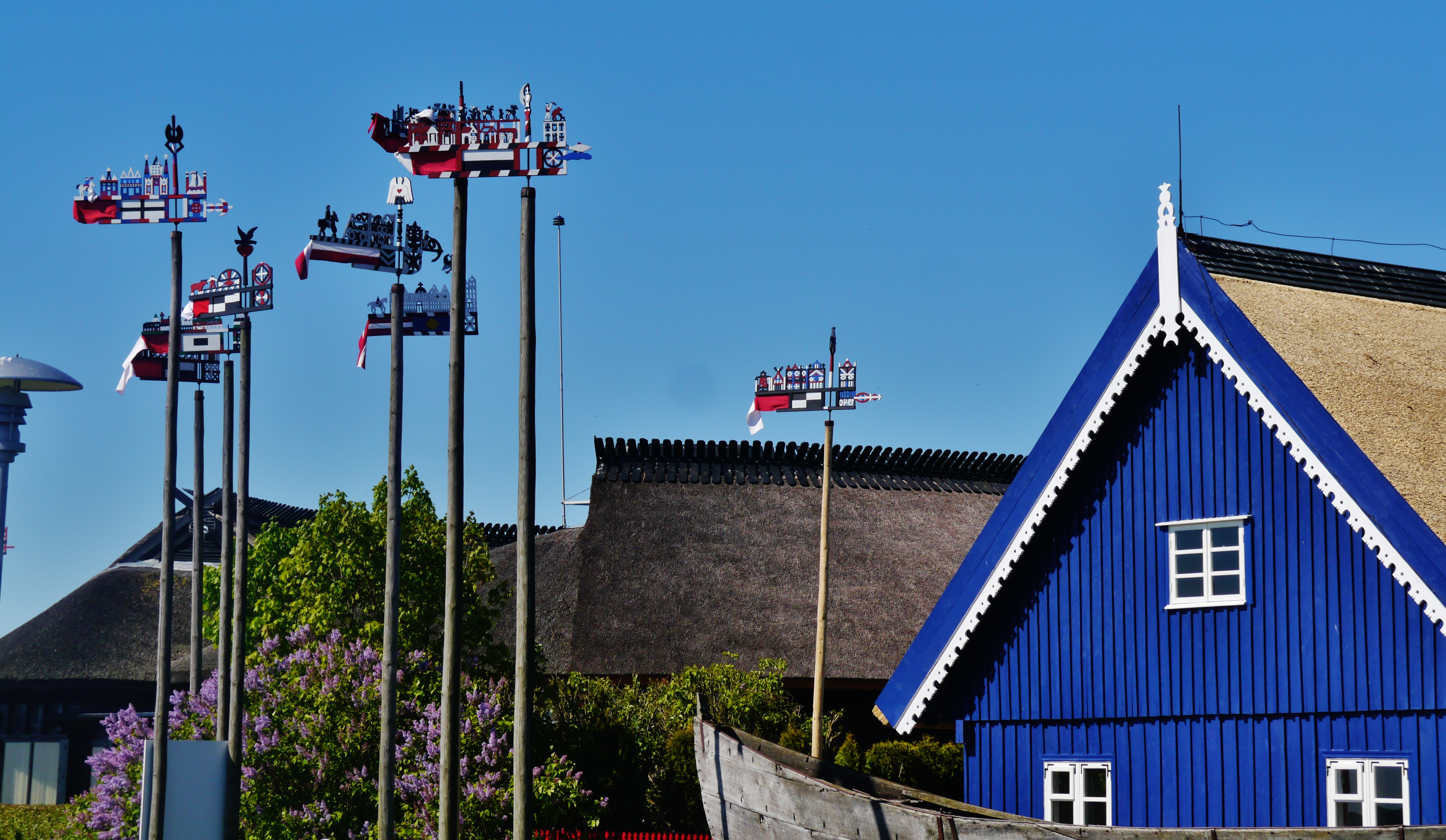
Curonian Lagoon Boat's Weathervanes in Nida, Lithuania

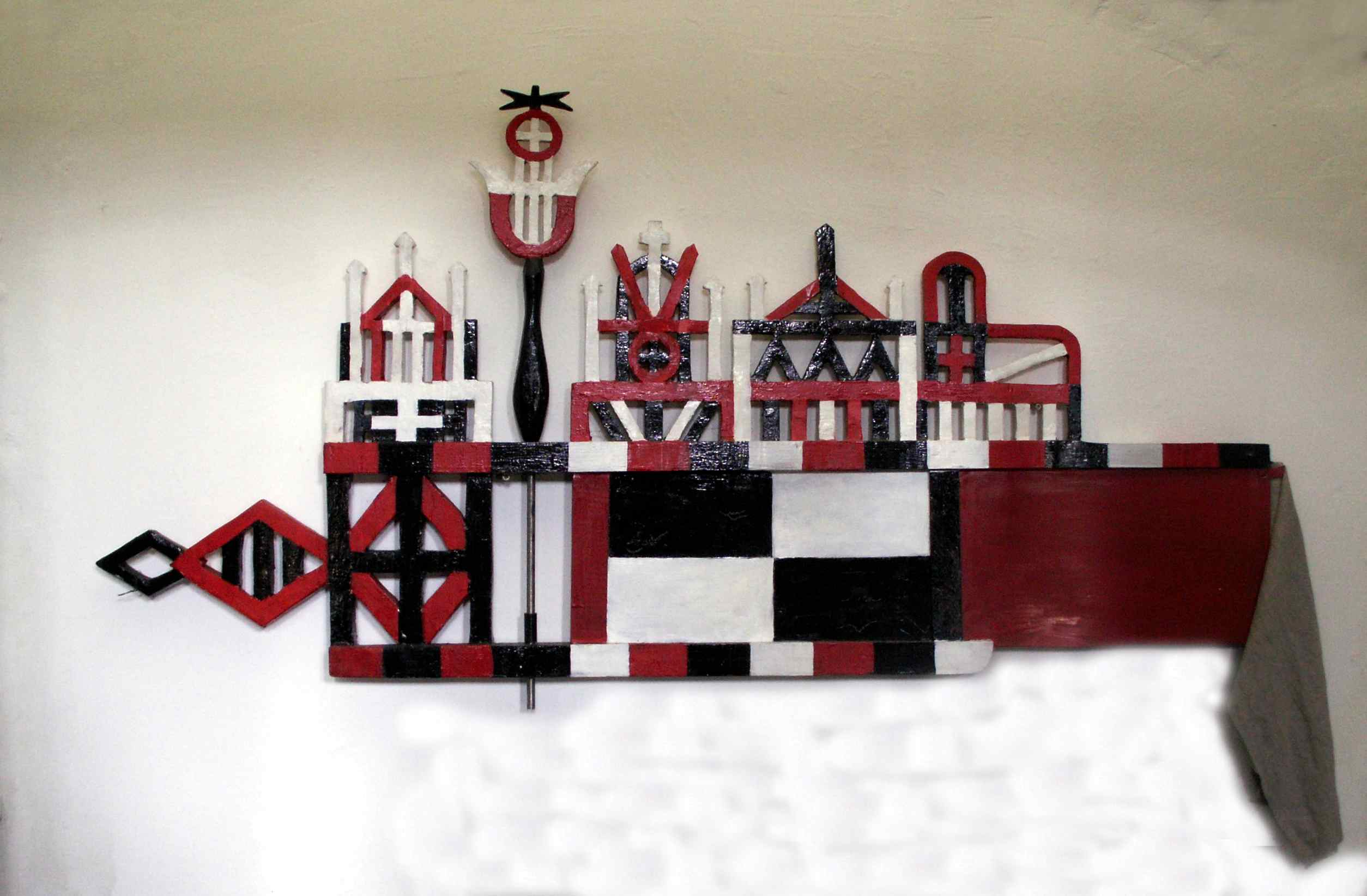
Close-up view of Nida's Weathervane

The Curonian weathervane is a unique decoration of boats, created by fishermen of the Curonian Lagoon in Lithuania. The weather vanes have been used for identifications, as well as decoration and indication of the direction of wind.

== History ==
In 1844 the Fishery Inspection of the Kingdom of Prussia – starting from the chief royal fishing inspector of the Curonian Lagoon Ernst Wilhelm Beerbohm (1786–1865) – regulated fishery by allowing sailing-boats to fish only in their assigned territories in order to fight poachers. Beerbohm, who lived in Muižė manor near the Ventė Cape, is considered to be the pioneer of weathervanes.

Different weathervanes allowed for boats of different fishermen to be distinguished from a distance, and were thus painted in contrasting colors. Different geometric signs marked individual villages of Curonian Spit. Black and white weathervanes marked villages of the Curonian Spit, red and white weathervanes marked villages from the eastern coast of Lithuania Minor, and yellow and blue weathervanes marked villages from the southern coast of Lithuania Minor. Red and white colored flags was attached at the end of each weathervane.

The first weathervanes were made out of tin or wood, with oak or ash-tree traditionally used for the overall frame, and linden or willow for open-cut carvings. The size (114– 116 cm long without a flag and 40–45 cm height) and material of a weathervane has remained largely the same since then.

Around 1890 fishermen began decorating their colored weathervanes more elaborately. The frameworks of the weathervanes were decorated with images of buildings (such as lighthouses, fishermen’s houses, and churches) and allegorical or religious symbols (such as ships, human and animal figures, crosses, hearts, anchors, and rising suns). These highly decorated weathervanes showcased not only the village of the owner, but also his social standing.

== Modern day ==
After the First World War the weathervanes lost their purpose as identification signs, since much of the territory of the Lithuania Minor was incorporated into the Republic of Lithuania. However, the weathervanes remained a sign of identity for people from the coastal villages of Curonian Lagoon. They are used to decorate modern replicas of historical ships, surroundings, and are sold as souvenirs for tourists.

The weathervane from the Northern Curonian Spit is used in the coat of arms of Neringa city. Traditional weathervane is also used for the logo of Curonian Spit National Park (Lithuania).

In 2019 The making of Curonian Lagoon boats’ weathervanes were inscribed into The Intangible Cultural Heritage Inventory of Lithuania as a form of folk art, traditional craftsmanship or agricultural activities.

== Gallery ==
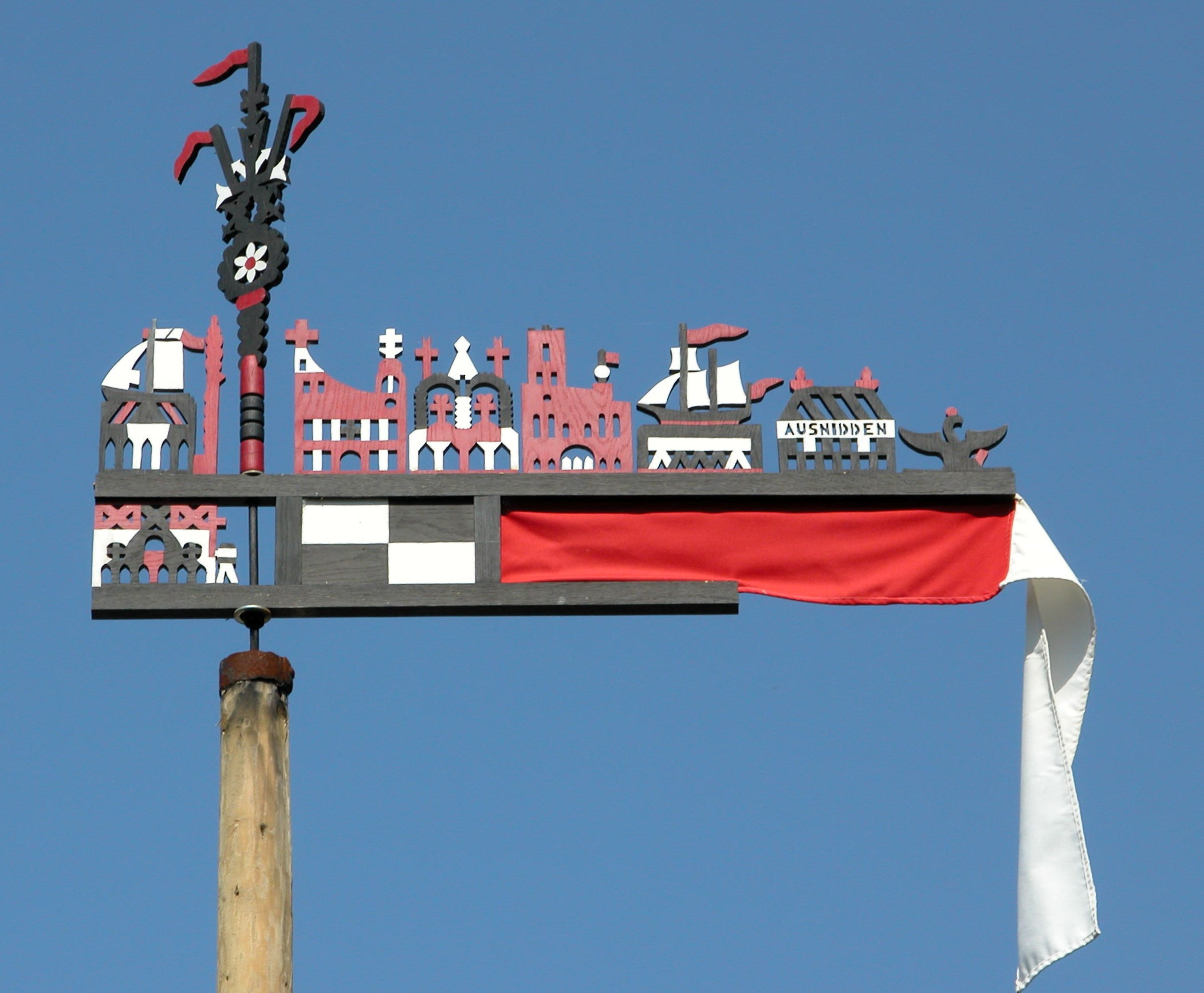
Modern weathervane of Curonian Spit

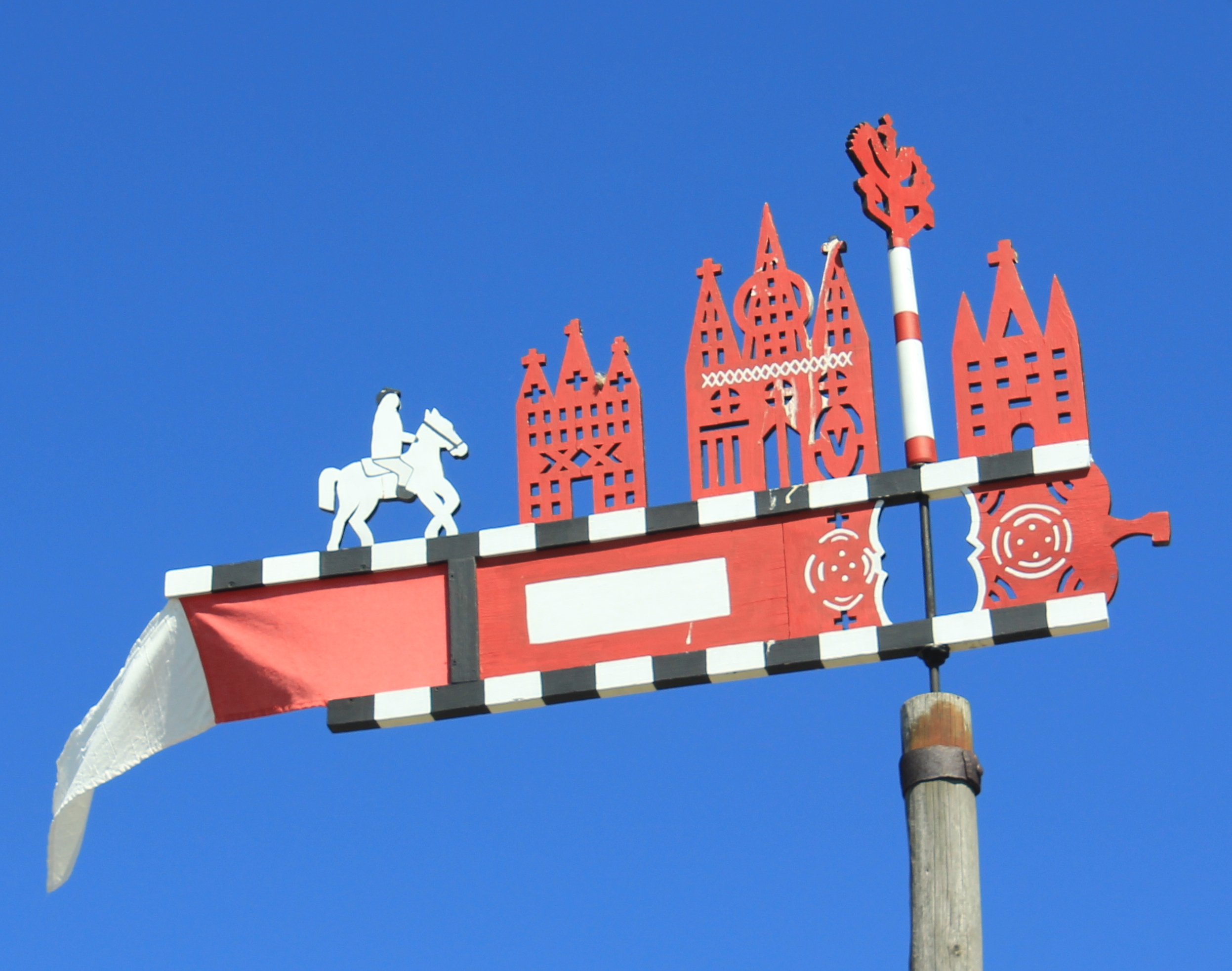
Traditional weathervane in Nida

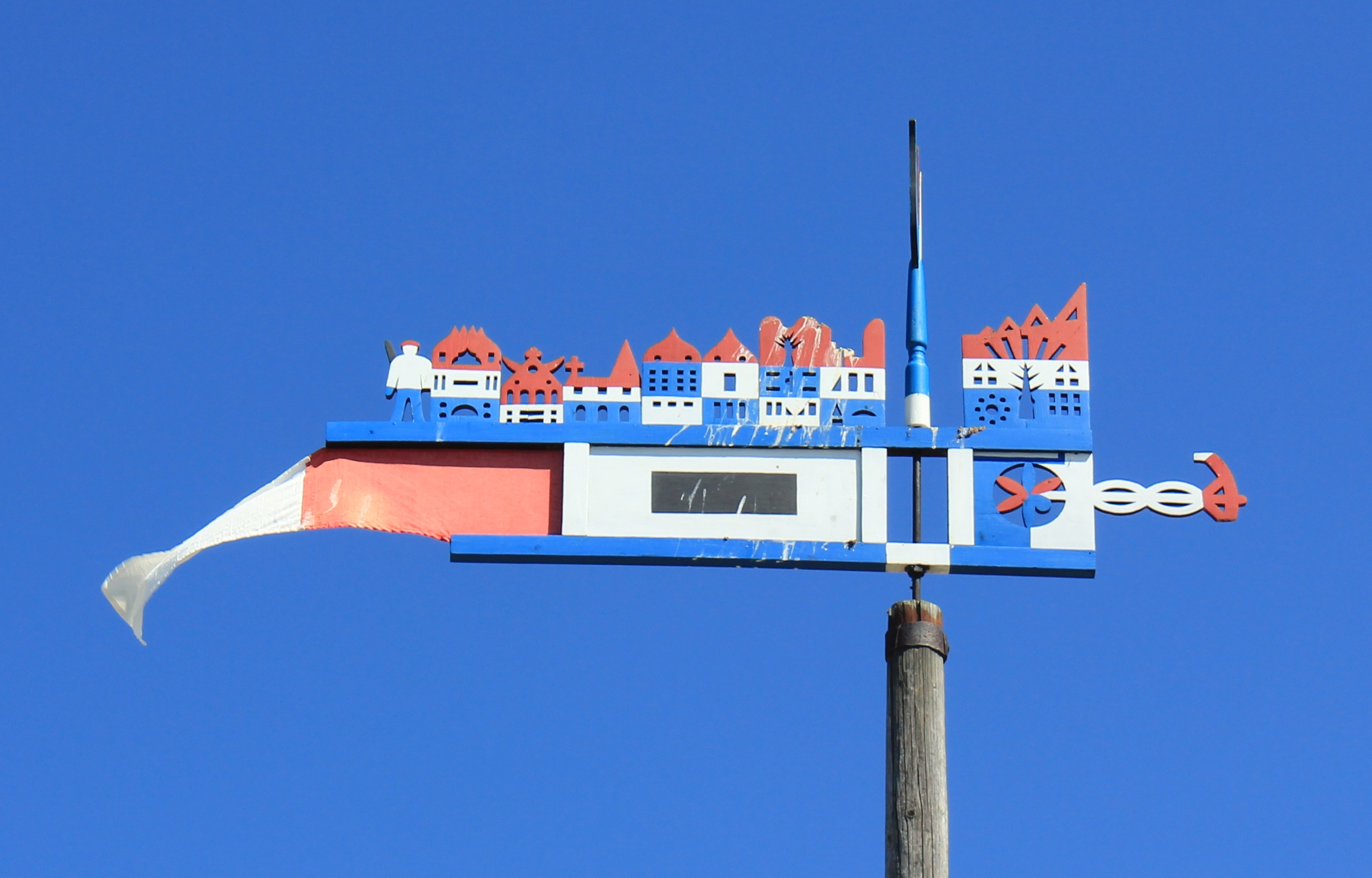
Traditional weathervane in Nida

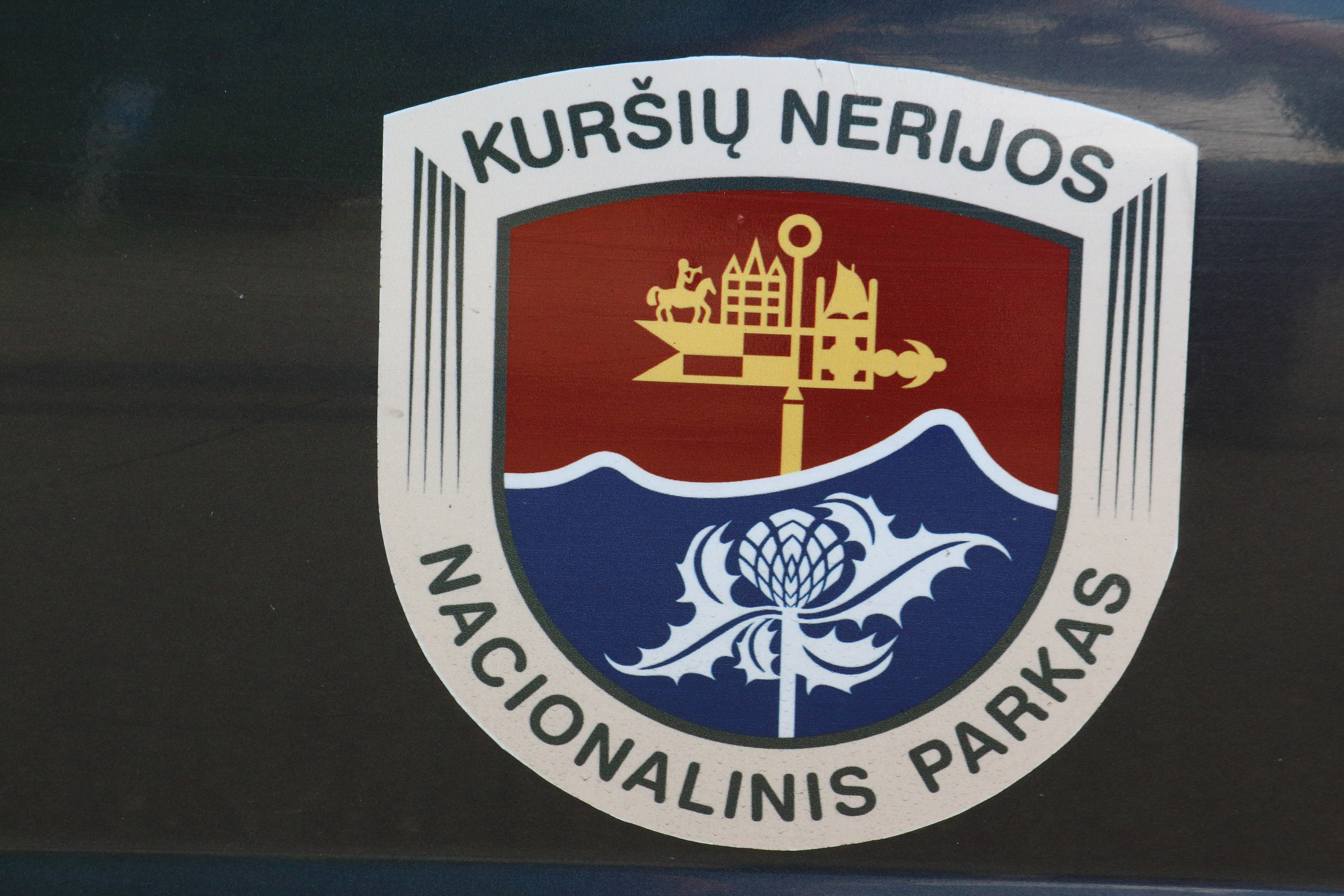
The logo of Curonian Spit National Park (Lithuania)

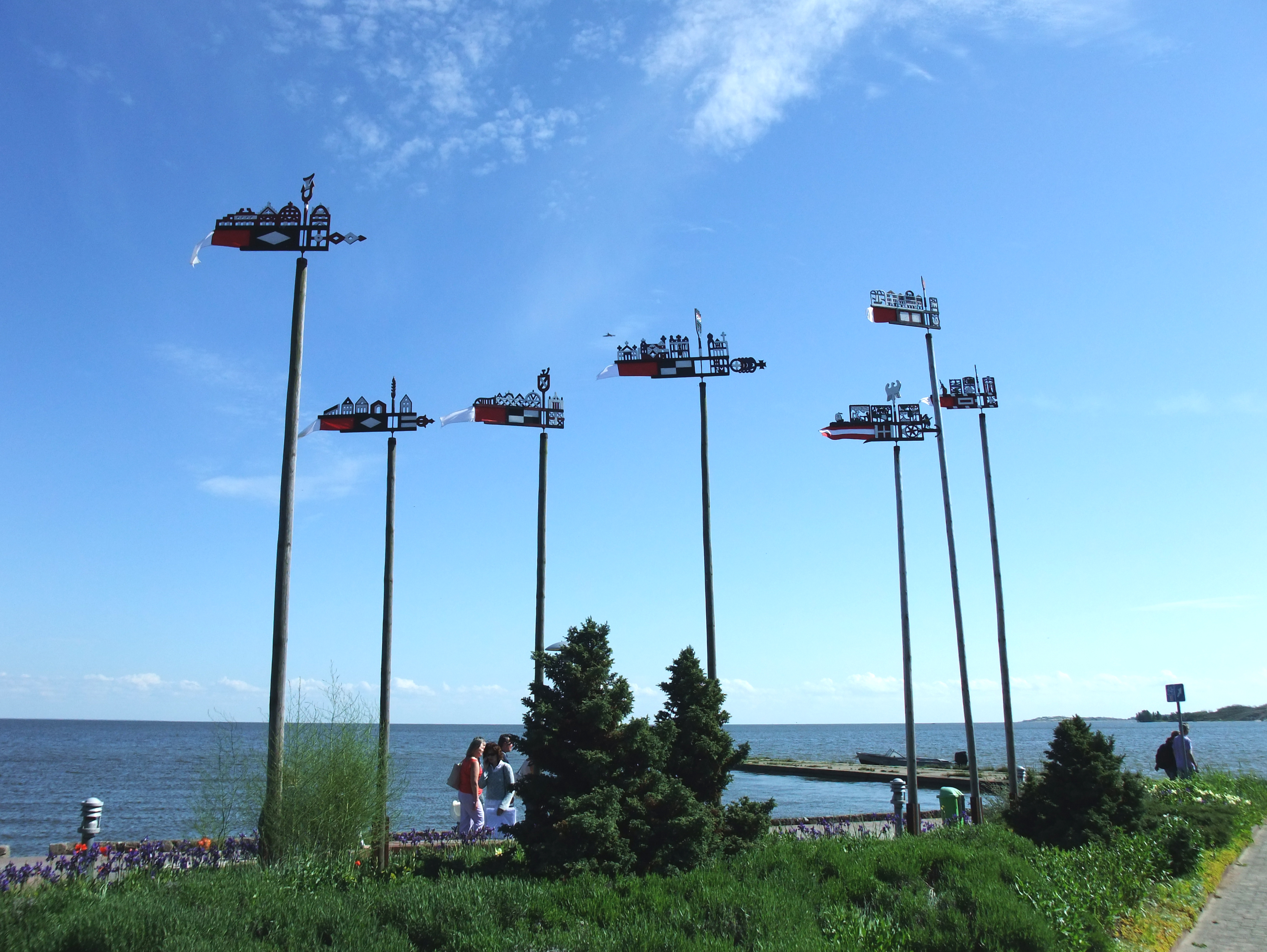
Traditional weathervanes decorate the surroundings of Nida

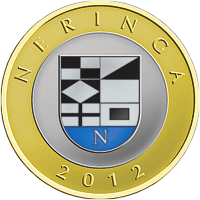
Coat of arms of Neringa city, commemorated on 2 litai coin in 2012

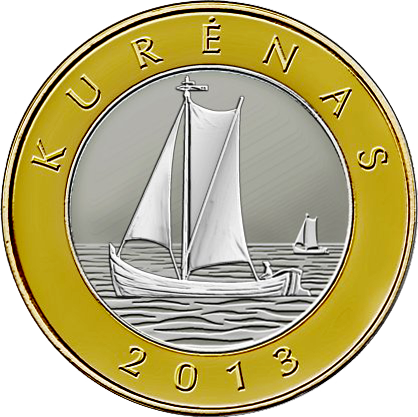
Traditional boat of Curonian Lagoon with weathervane, commemorated on 2 litai coin in 2013

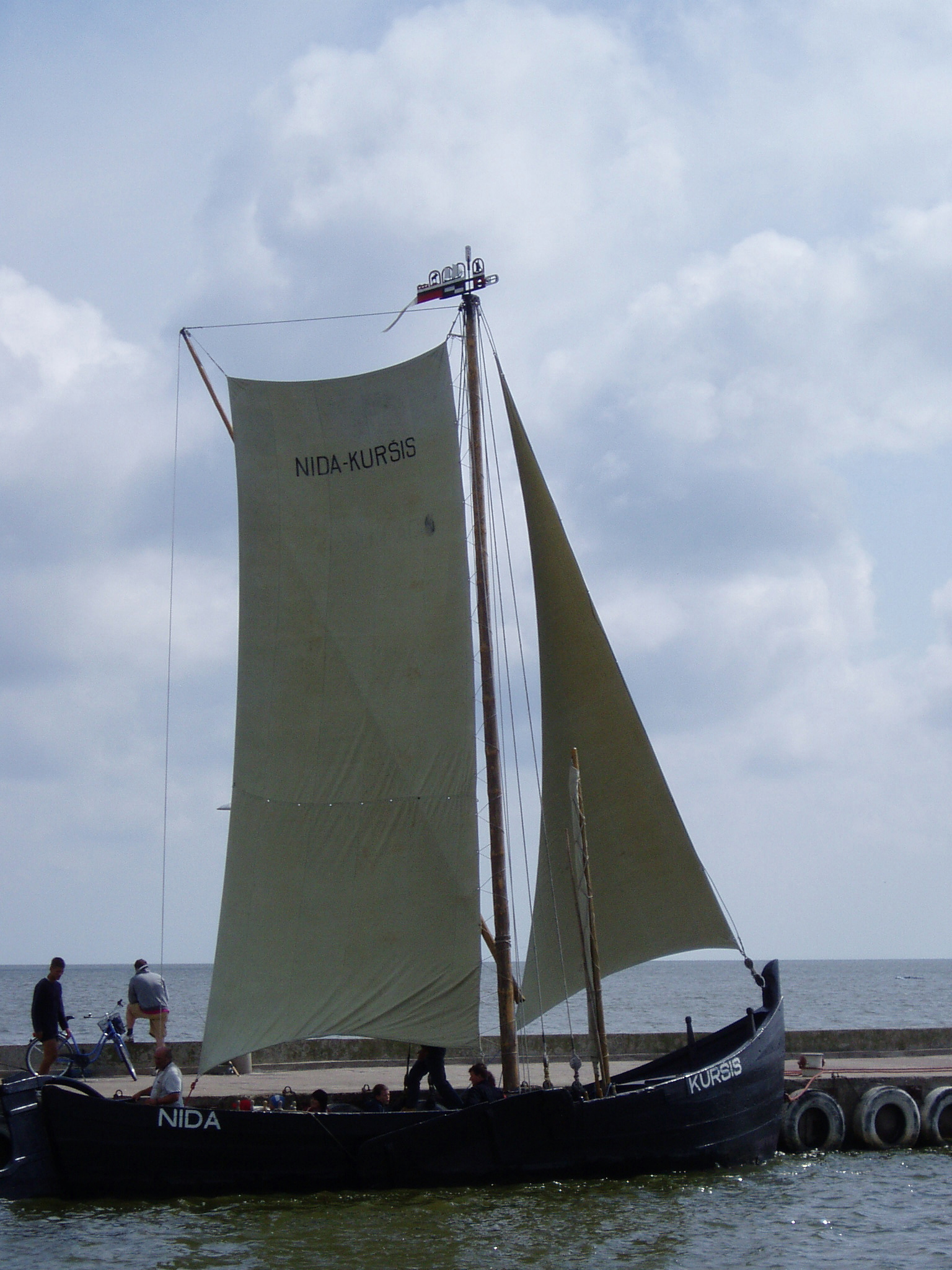
Kurenkahn boat in Curonian Lagoon, Nida, Lithuania

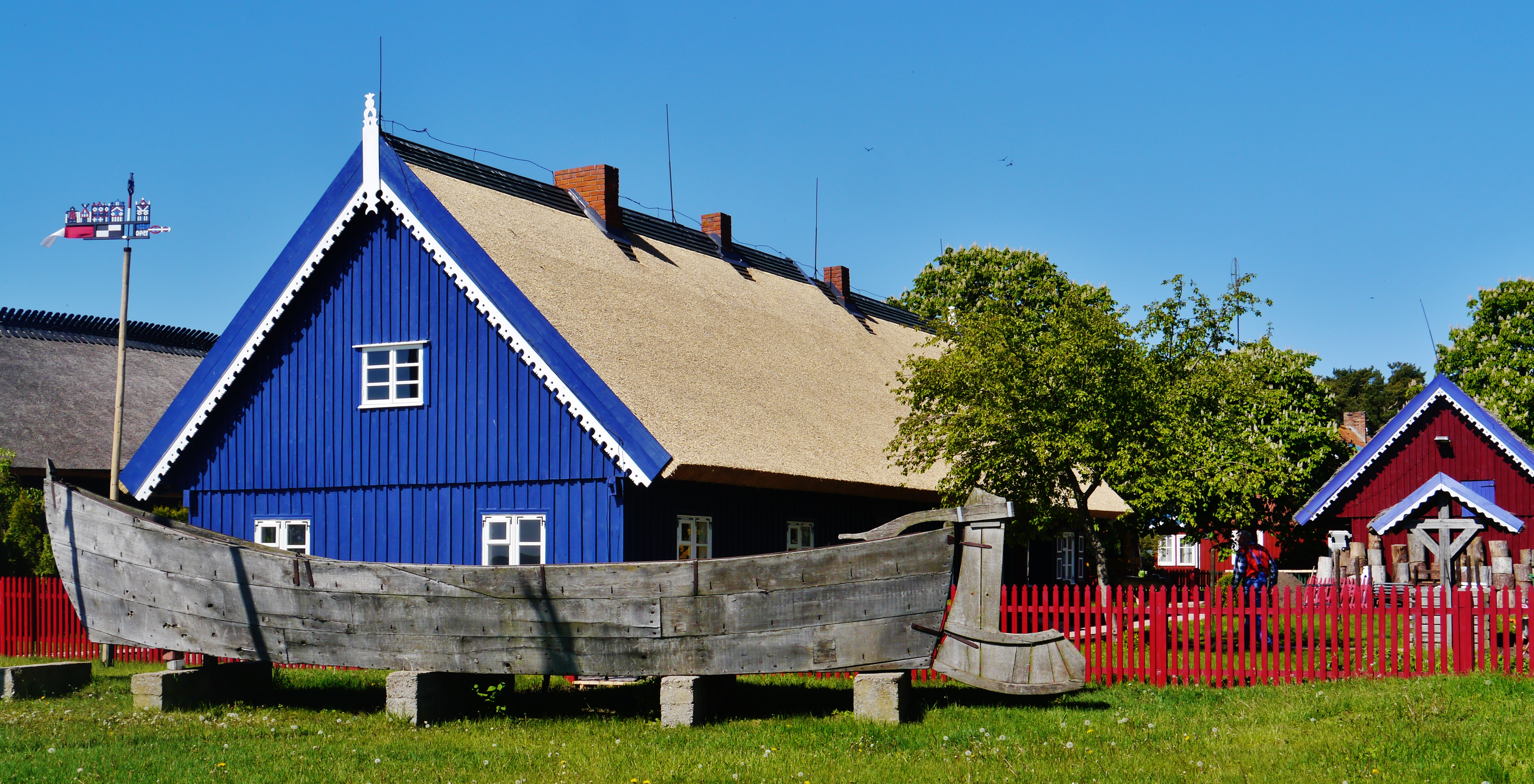
Wooden houses at Nida, Curonian Spit, Lithuania, decorated with traditional weathervane
