= Swan Princess =

Swan Princess may refer to:

- the main character from the ballet Swan Lake
- The Swan Princess, a 1994 American animated musical fantasy film
  - The Swan Princess (film series), the franchise it spawned
  - The Swan Princess (soundtrack), its soundtrack
- Swan Princess (horse), a British racehorse
- The Swan Princess (painting), a 1900 painting by Mikhail Vrubel

== See also ==
- Swan Lake (disambiguation)
