= Bulrush Lake =

Bulrush Lake may refer to:

in Canada

- Bulrush Lake (Saskatchewan), in Saskatchewan

in New Zealand

- Bulrush Lake (Northland)
