= Curonian Spit =

Sand dune spit on the Baltic

UNESCO World Heritage Site
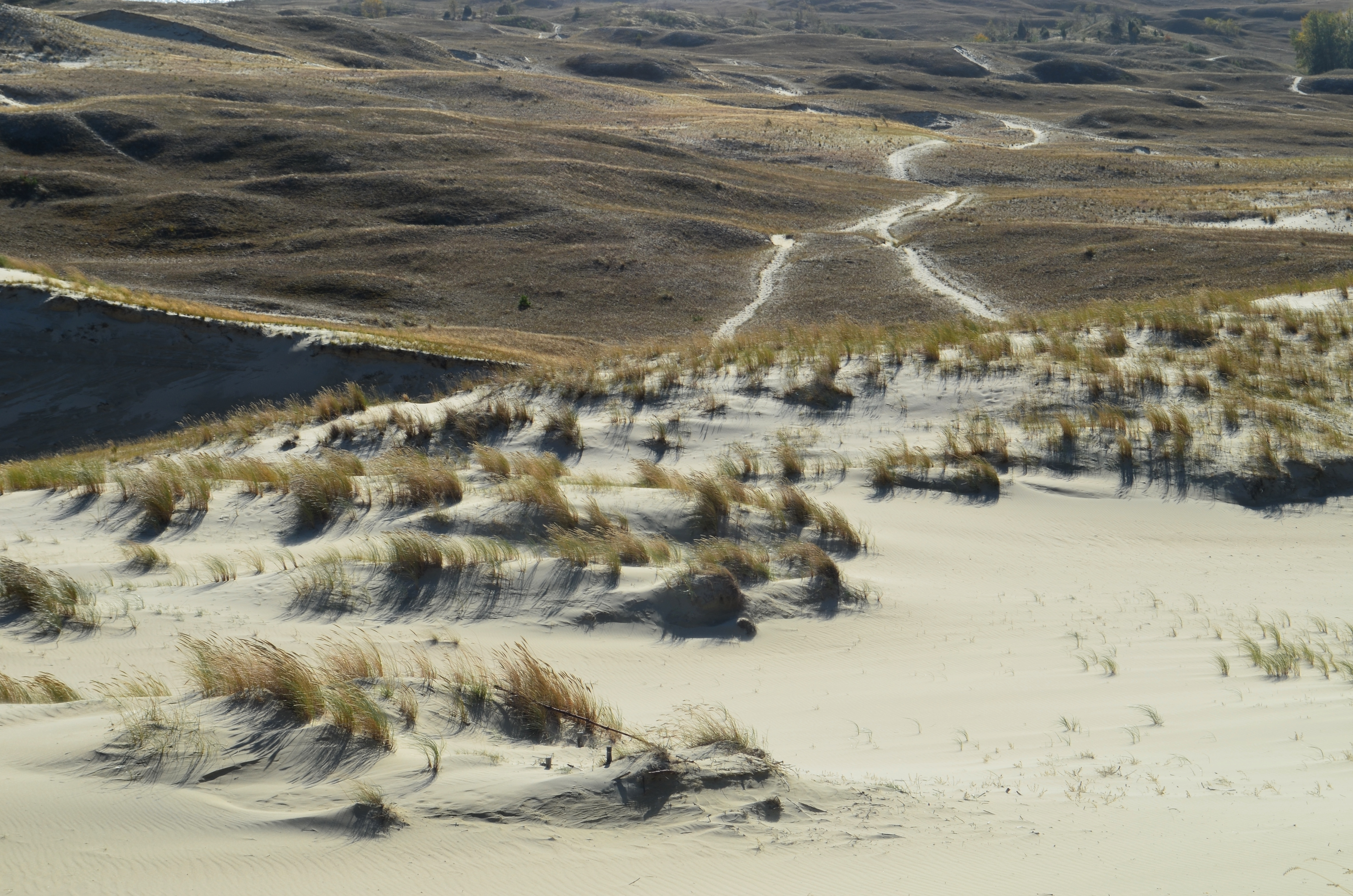
- The Valley of Death looking from the Parnidis Dune in Neringa Municipality, Lithuania, in October 2022.

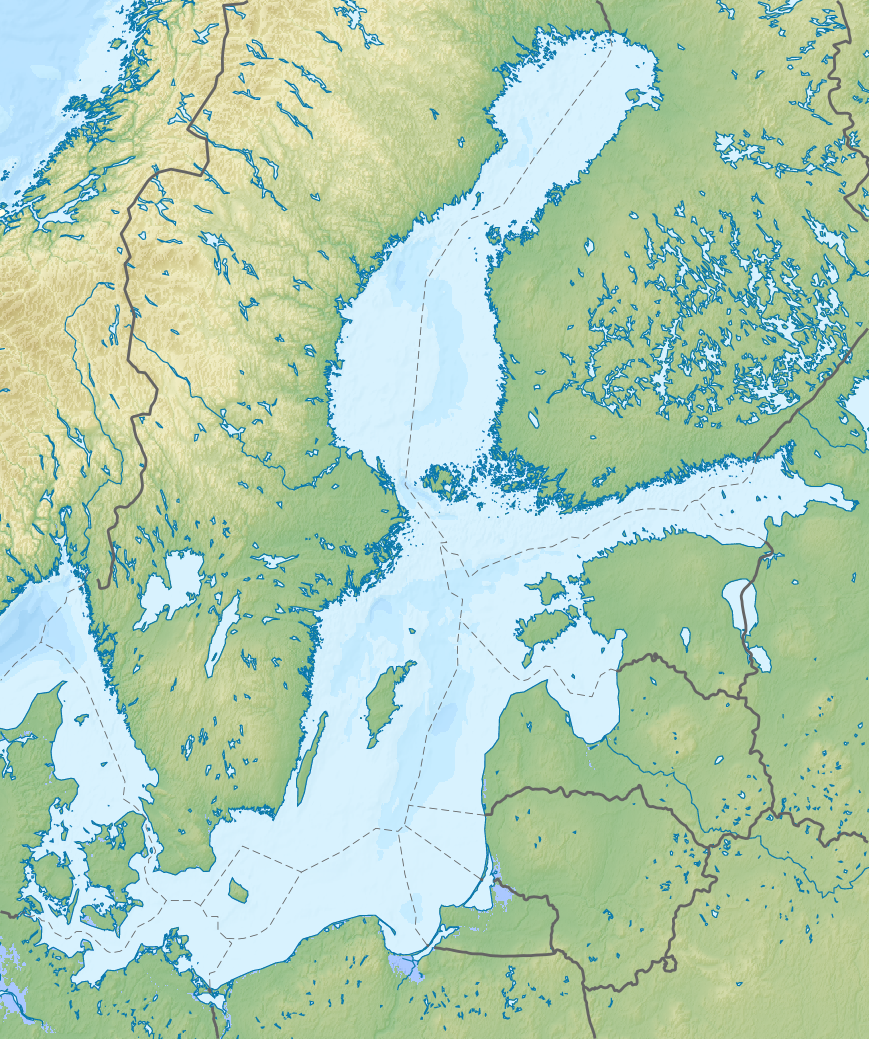
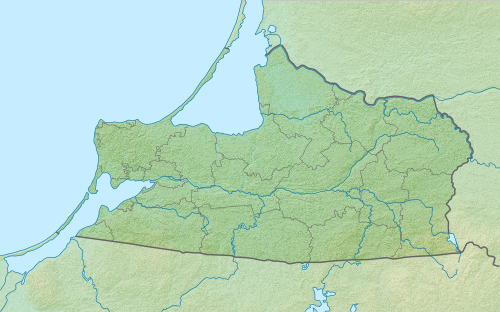
- Location within Baltic Sea Location within Kaliningrad Oblast Location within Lithuania
- Location: Klaipėda County, Lithuania Zelenogradsky District, Kaliningrad Oblast, Russia
- Criteria: Cultural: v
- Reference: 994
- Inscription: 2000 (24th Session)
- Area: 33,021 ha (81,600 acres)
- Coordinates: 55°16′28″N 20°58′15″E

The Curonian Spit, sometimes called Courish Split (Lithuanian: Kuršių nerija; Russian: Ку́ршская коса́ / Kurshskaya kosa, German: Kurische Nehrung), is a 98-kilometre-long (61 mi), thin, curved sand-dune spit that separates the Curonian Lagoon from the Baltic Sea. It is a UNESCO World Heritage Site shared by Lithuania and Russia. Its southern portion lies within Kaliningrad Oblast of Russia, and its northern within southwestern Klaipėda County of Lithuania.

== Geography ==
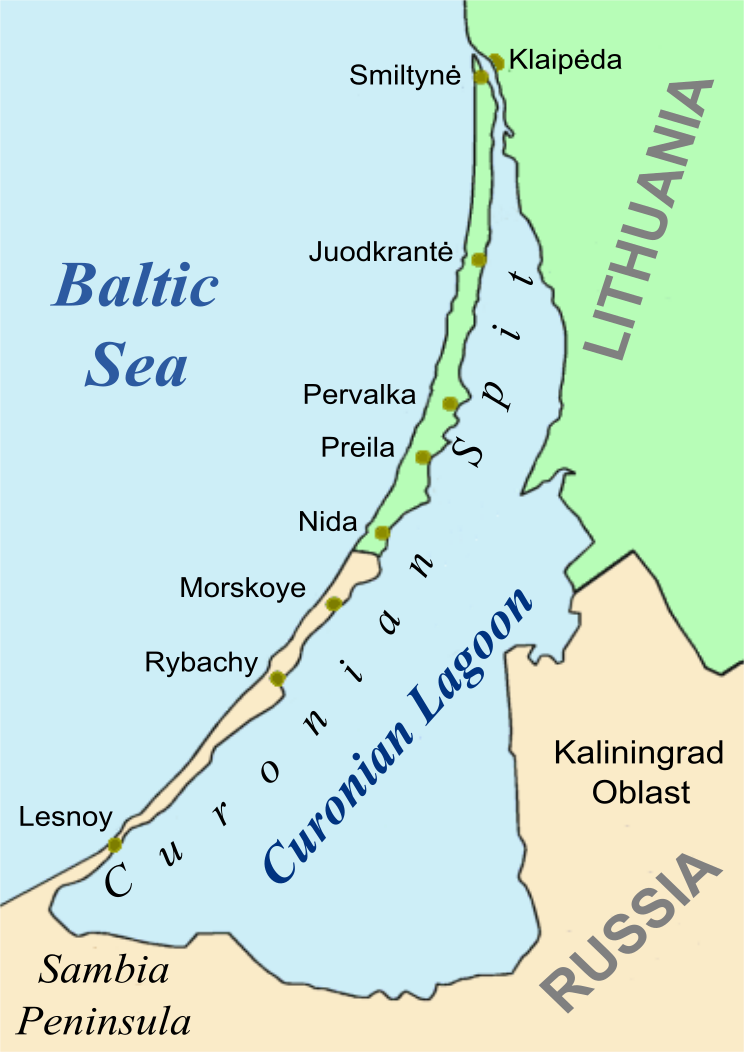
Curonian Spit and Lagoon

The Curonian Spit stretches from the Sambia Peninsula on the south to its northern tip next to a narrow strait, across which is the port city of Klaipėda on the Lithuanian mainland. The northern 52-kilometre-long (32 mi) stretch of the Curonian Spit peninsula lies in Klaipėda County, Lithuania, while the rest is part of Kaliningrad Oblast, Russia. The width of the spit varies from a minimum of 400 m (1,300 ft) in Russia (near the village of Lesnoy) to a maximum of 3,800 m (12,500 ft; 2.4 mi) in Lithuania (just north of Nida).

== Geologic history ==
The Curonian Spit was formed about 3rd millennium BC. A glacial moraine served as its foundation; winds and sea currents later contributed enough sand to raise and keep the formation above sea level.

The existence of this narrow shoal is inherently threatened by the natural processes that govern shoreline features. It depends on a dynamic balance between sand transport and deposition. Geologically it is an ephemeral coast element. The most likely development is that the shallow bay inside the Curonian Spit will eventually fill up with sediment, thus creating new land.

== Human history ==
=== Mythology ===
According to folk etymology for the name of Neringa Municipality, there was a giantess girl named Neringa, who formed the Curonian Spit and helped fishermen.

=== Medieval period ===
From c. 800 to 1016, the Spit was the location of Kaup, a major pagan trading centre which has not yet been excavated. The Teutonic Knights occupied the area in the 13th century, building their castles at Memel (1252), Neuhausen (1283), and at Rossitten (1372). In 1454, King Casimir IV Jagiellon incorporated the region into the Kingdom of Poland upon the request of the anti-Teutonic Prussian Confederation. After the subsequent Thirteen Years' War (1454–1466) the Teutonic Order regained authority over the spit as a fief of the Polish Crown. The spit may have been the home of the last living speakers of now-extinct Old Prussian, one of the Baltic languages.

=== Kursenieki habitation ===
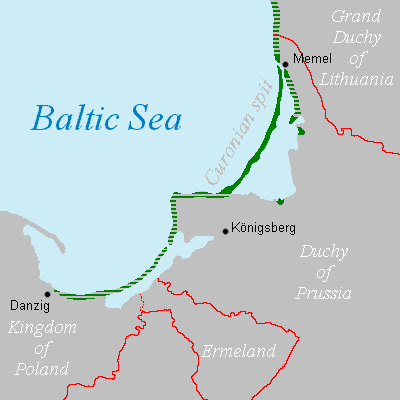
Kursenieki populated area in 1649

Significant human impacts on the area began in the 16th century. From the 18th century, it was part of the Kingdom of Prussia. Deforestation of the spit due to overgrazing, timber harvesting, and building of boats for the Battle of Gross-Jägersdorf in 1757 led to the dunes taking over the spit and burying entire villages. Alarmed by these problems, the Prussian government sponsored large-scale revegetation and reforestation efforts, which started in 1825. Owing to these efforts, much of the spit is now covered with forests.

In the 19th century the Curonian Spit was inhabited primarily by Kursenieki, with a significant German minority in the south and a Lithuanian minority in the north. The population of Kursenieki eventually dwindled due to assimilation and other reasons; it is close to non-existent these days.

=== Artists' colony ===
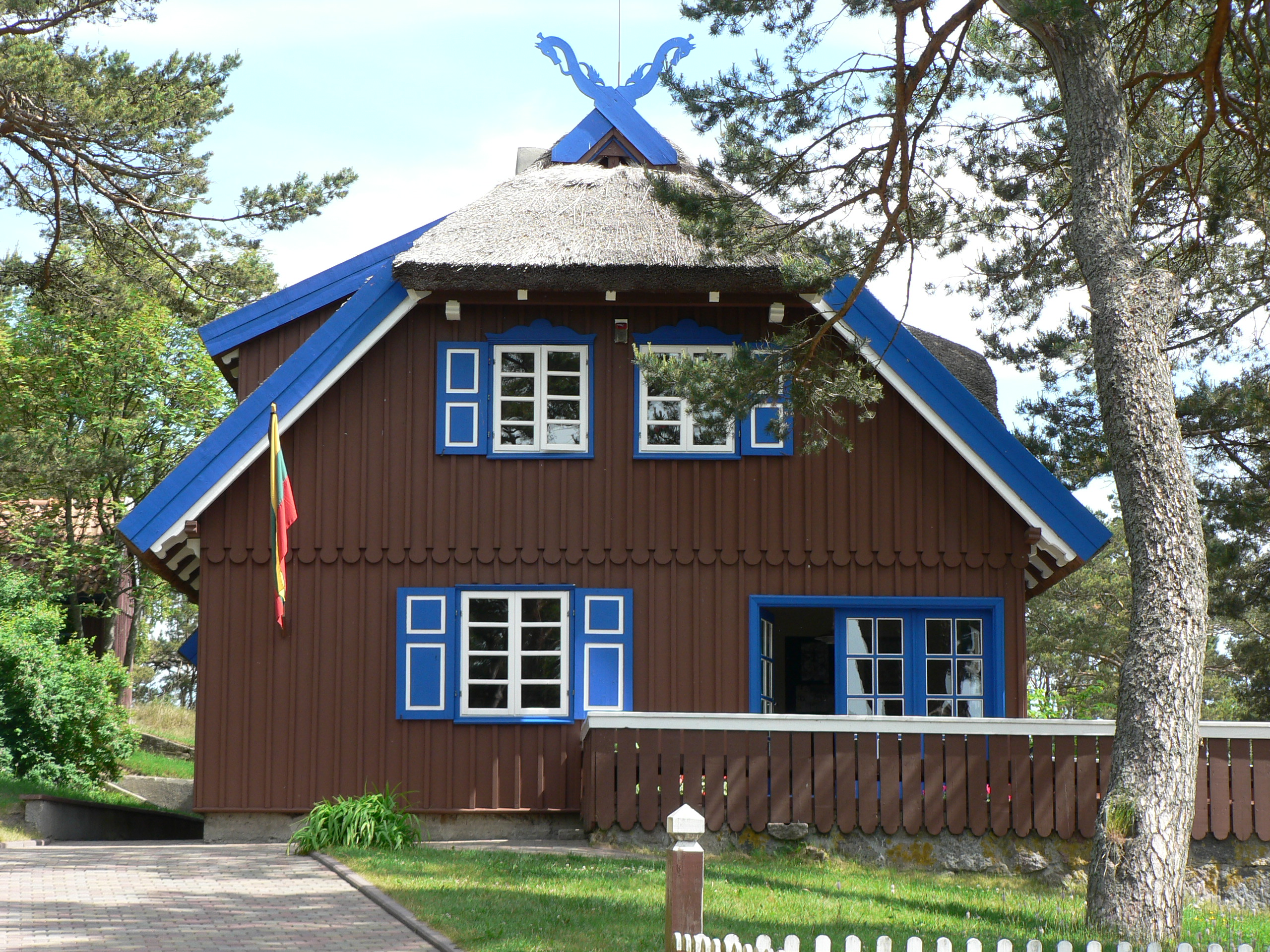
Thomas Mann's summer home

From the late 19th century, the dune landscape around Nidden (Nida) became popular with landscape and animal painters from the Kunstakademie Königsberg arts school. The local inn of Herman Blode was the nucleus of the expressionist artists' colony (Künstlerkolonie Nidden). Lovis Corinth stayed here in 1890, followed by artists such as Max Pechstein, Alfred Lichtwark, Karl Schmidt-Rottluff, and Alfred Partikel. Painters from Königsberg such as Julius Freymuth visited the area, as did poets like Ernst Wiechert and Carl Zuckmayer. Other guests included Ernst Kirchner, and Franz Domscheit.

=== 20th century ===
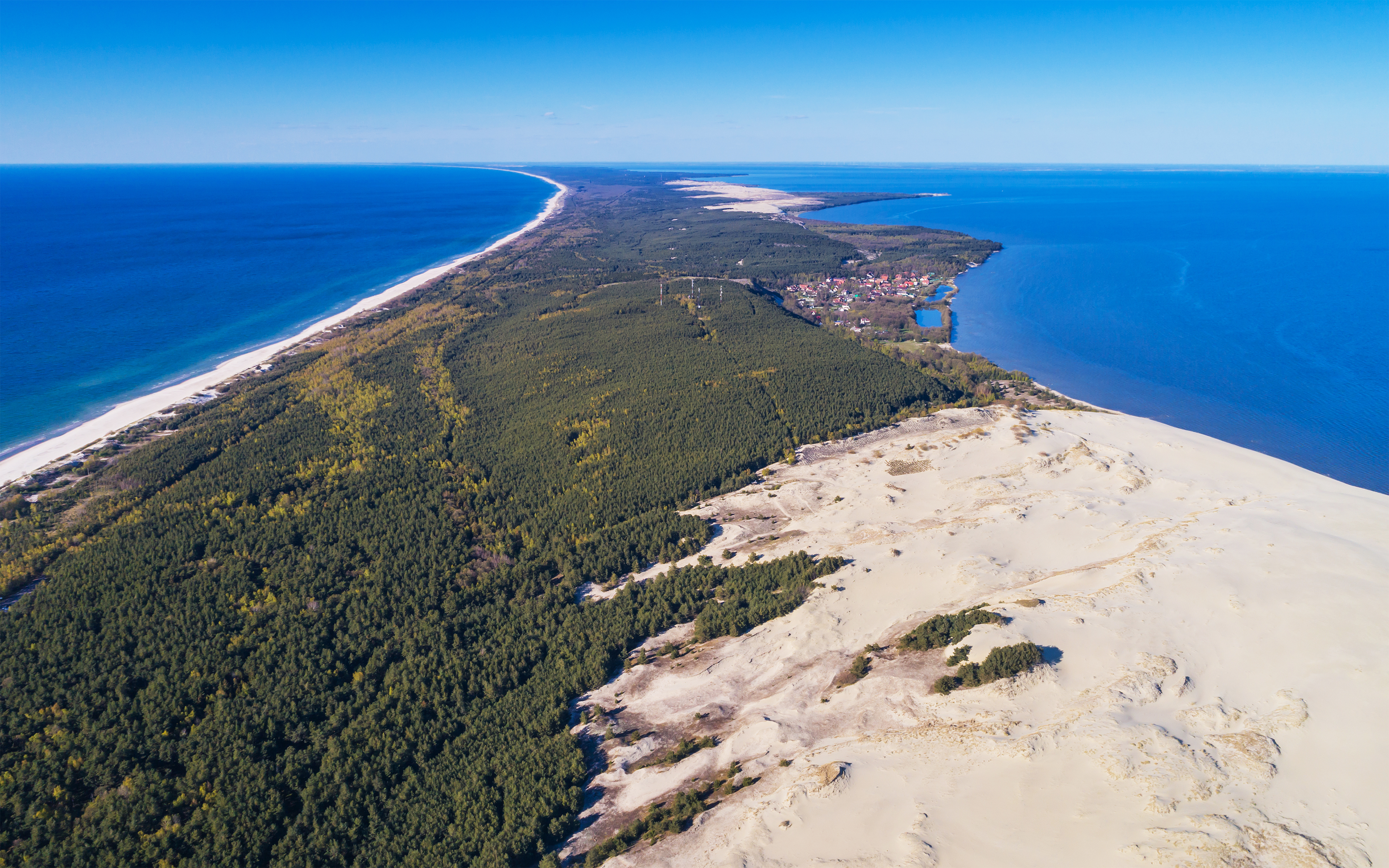
Curonian Spit in Kaliningrad Oblast, Russia

From 1901 to 1946 the village of Rossitten, now Rybachy, became the site of the Rossitten Bird Observatory, founded by German ornithologist Johannes Thienemann there because of the Spit's importance as a bird migration corridor.

After World War I, Nidden, together with the northern half of the Curonian Spit became part of the Klaipėda Region according to the 1919 Treaty of Versailles and was annexed by Lithuania in 1923. Officially renamed Nida, the village nevertheless remained a German-majority settlement – the border with the remaining East Prussian half of the Spit lay only a few kilometres to the south.

In 1929 Nobel Prize-winning writer Thomas Mann visited Nida while on holiday in nearby Rauschen and decided to have a summer house erected on a hill above the Lagoon, mocked as Uncle Tom's Cabin (Onkel Toms Hütte) by locals. He and his family spent the summers of 1930–1932 in the thatched cottage; parts of the novel Joseph and His Brothers (Joseph und seine Brüder) were written here. Threatened by the Nazis, Mann left Germany after Hitler's Machtergreifung in 1933 and never returned to Nida. After the Klaipėda Region was again annexed by Nazi Germany in 1939, his house was seized at the behest of Hermann Göring and served as a recreation home for Luftwaffe officers.

Following World War II, the Memelland and its part of the spit was restored to Lithuania, while the remainder fell to Russia. The German population was expelled after the war by the occupying Soviet forces in accordance with the Potsdam Agreement. Like elsewhere in present-day Kaliningrad Oblast, the assimilation of the territory and colonization by Russian settlers was completed by changing the historic German toponyms to Russian ones throughout the Russian-controlled part of the Spit.

=== Today ===
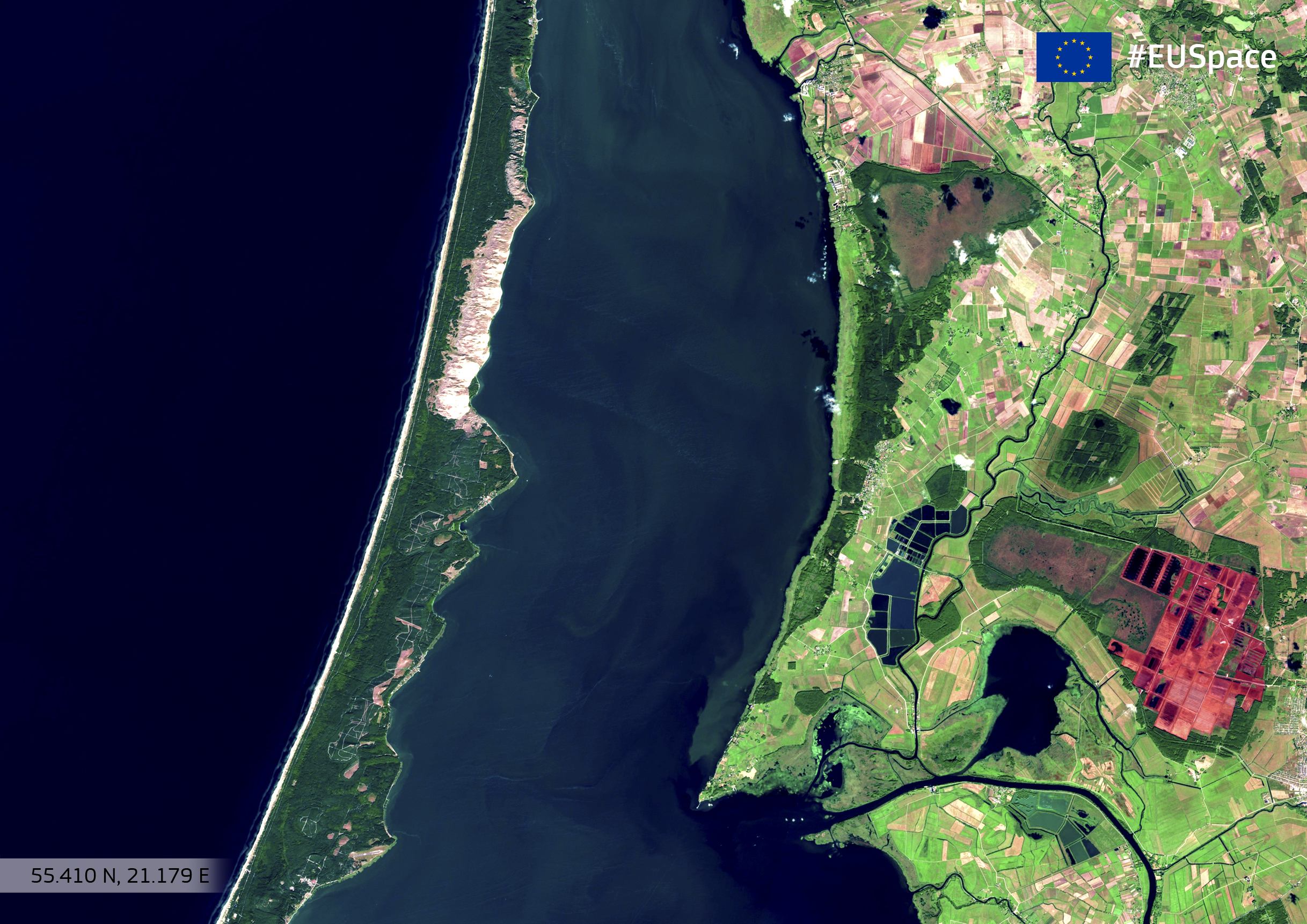
Lithuanian part from space

After the breakup of the Soviet Union, tourism flourished; many Germans, mostly the descendants of the inhabitants of the area, choose the Curonian Spit (especially Nida, as no visas are needed for Germans in Lithuania) as their holiday destination. In 2019 the making of Curonian Lagoon Boats’ Weathervanes was inscribed into The Intangible Cultural Heritage Inventory of Lithuania as a form of folk art, traditional craftsmanship or agricultural activities.

== Kursenieki ==
While today the Kursenieki, also known as Kuršininkai, are a nearly extinct Baltic ethnic group living along the Curonian Spit, in 1649 Kuršininkai settlement spanned from Memel (Klaipėda) to Gdańsk. The Kuršininkai were eventually assimilated by the Germans, except along the Curonian Spit where some still live. The Kuršininkai were considered Latvians until after World War I, when Latvia gained independence from the Russian Empire, a consideration based on linguistic arguments. This was the rationale for Latvian claims over the Curonian Spit, Memel and other territories of Prussia, which would be later dropped.

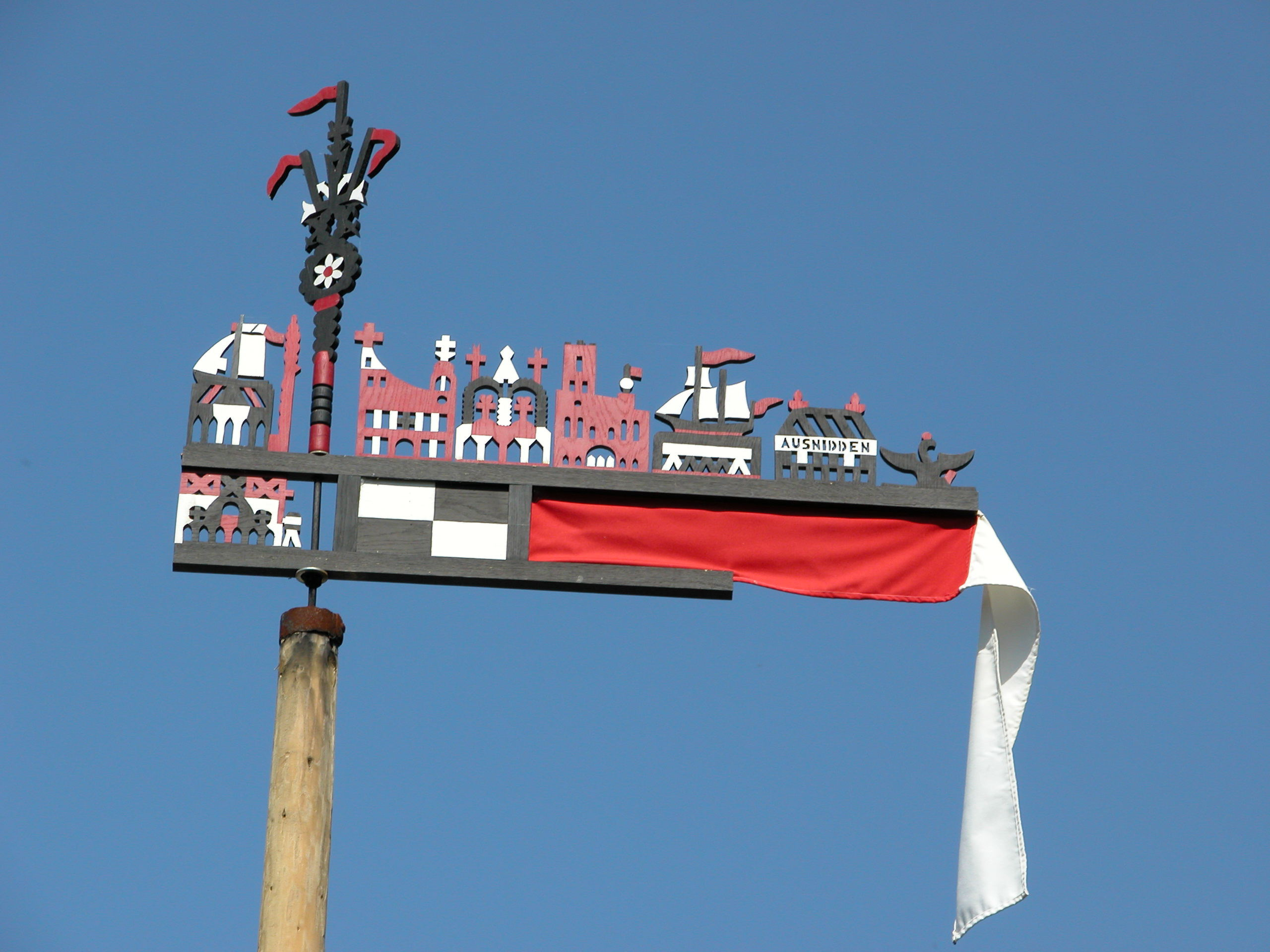
Curonian pennant, Nida

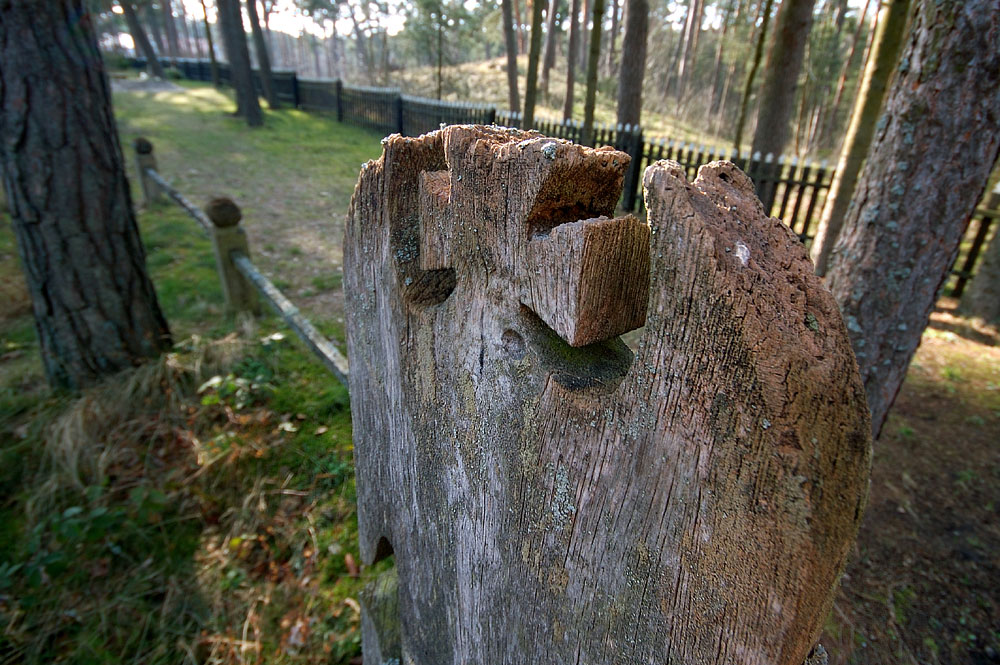
Krikštas burial marker

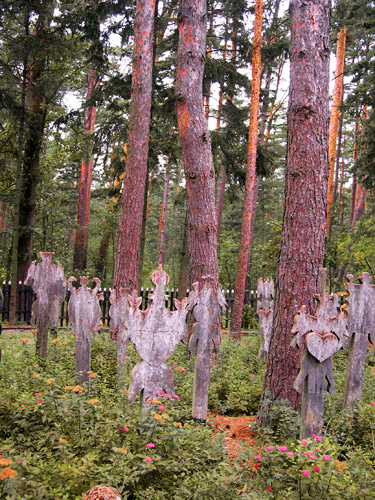
Old cemetery in Nida

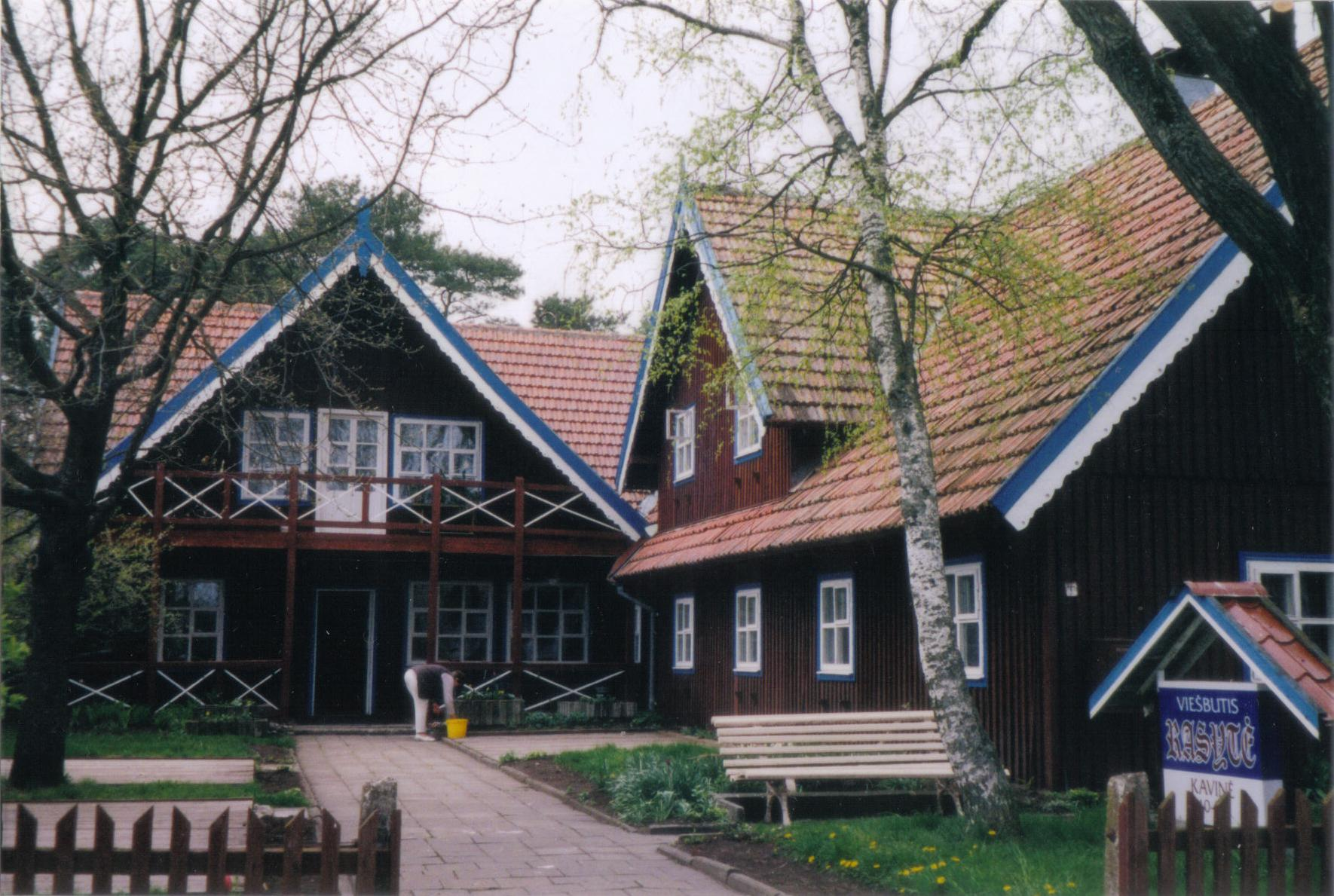
Small inn and cafe in Nida

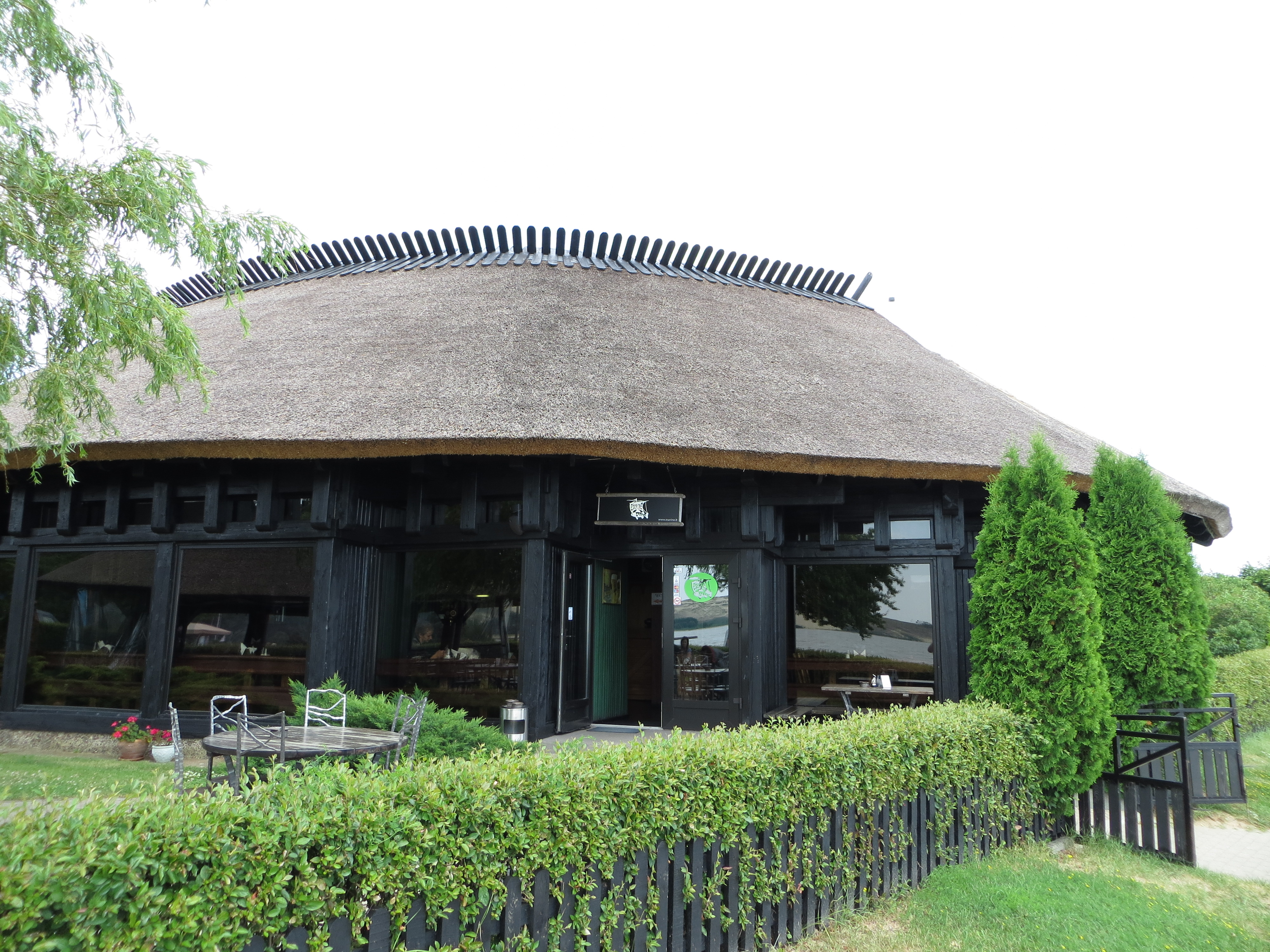
Fish restaurant in Nida

== Current state ==
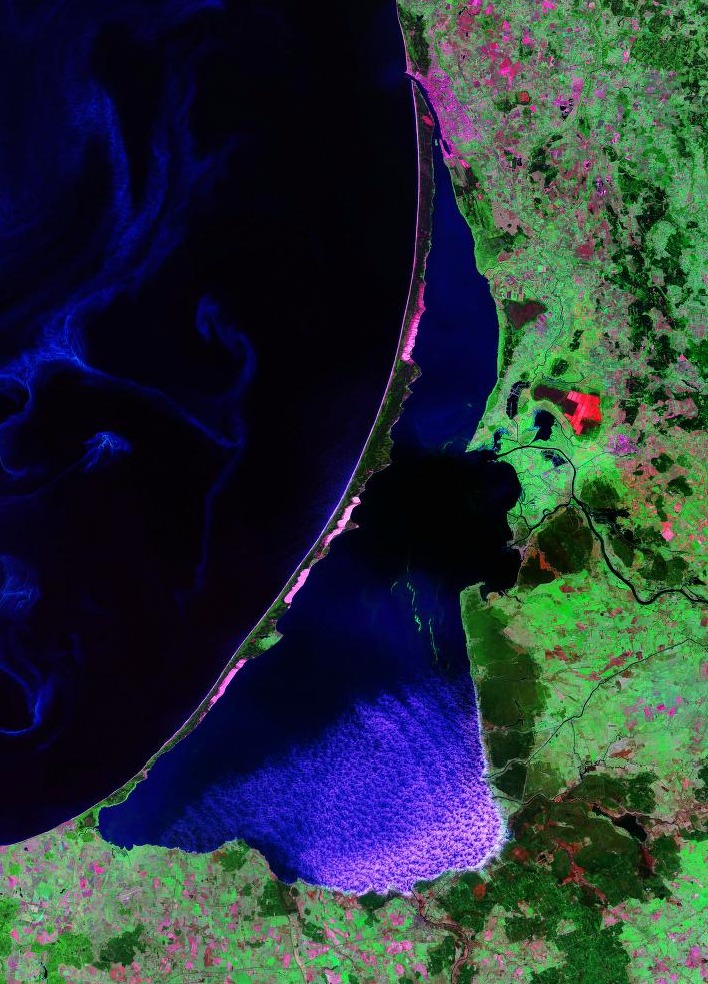
Landsat photo

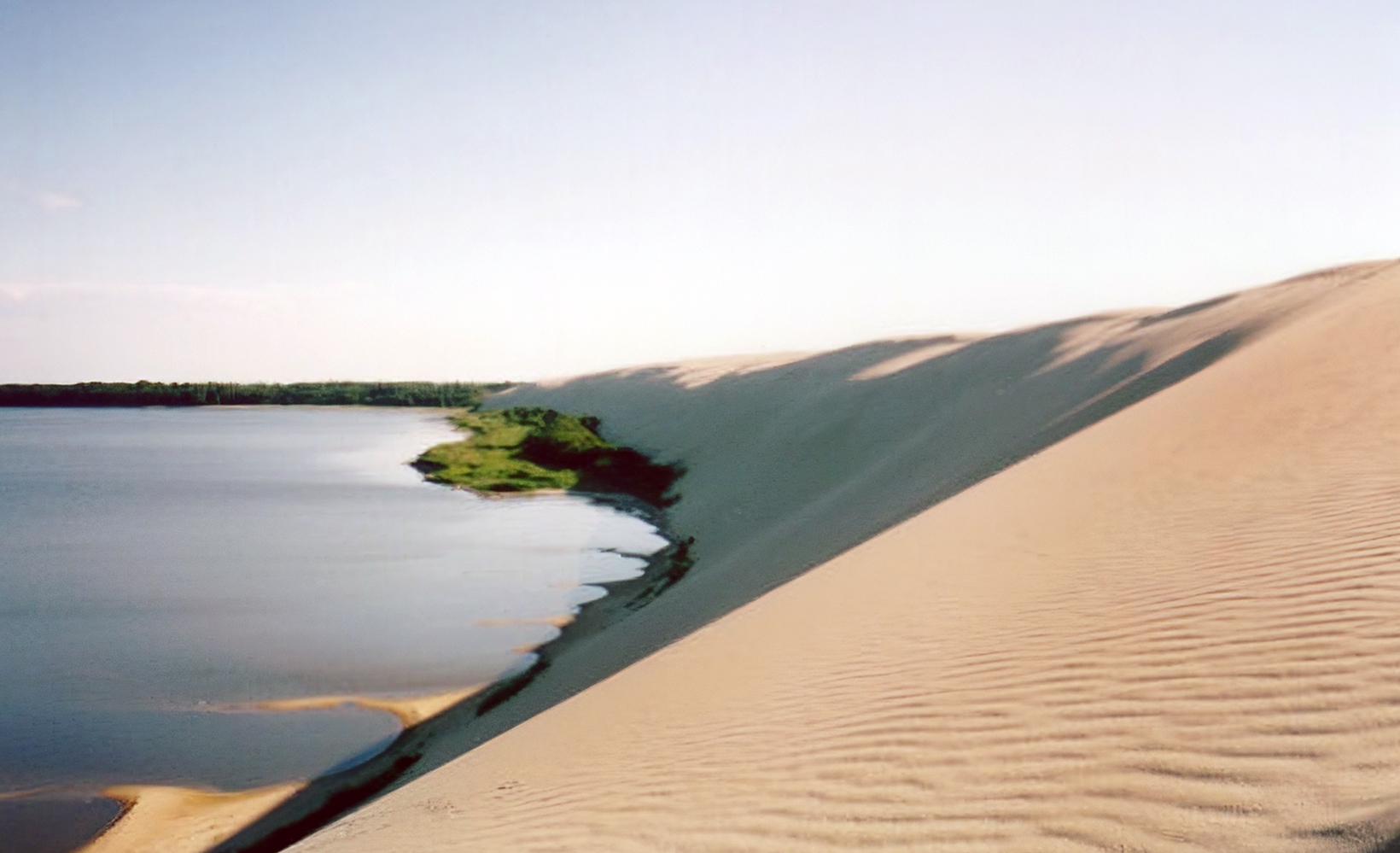
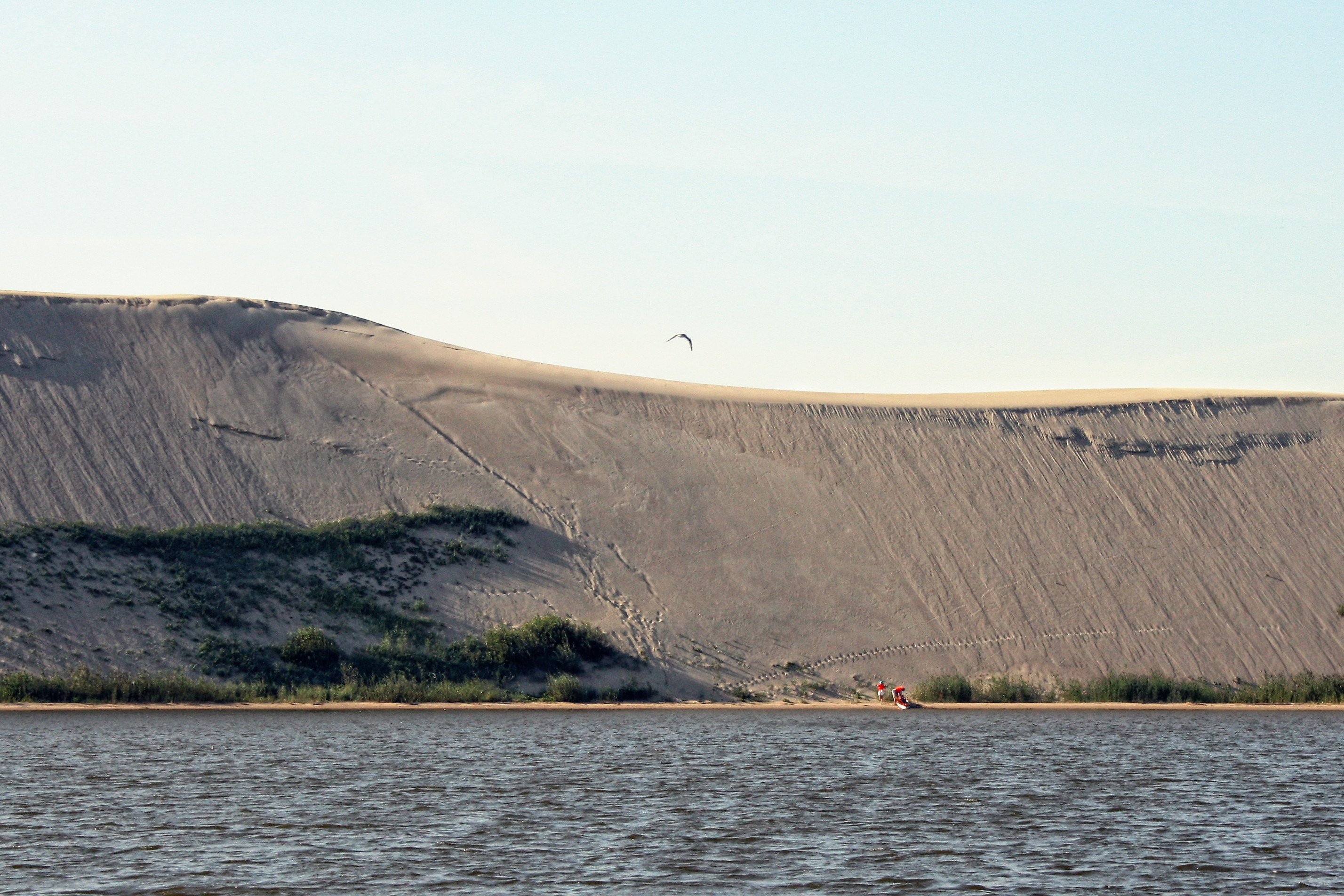
Curonian Spit sand dunes in Nida, Lithuania

The Curonian Spit is home to the highest moving (drifting) sand dunes in Europe. Their average height is 35 metres (115 ft), but some attain a height of 60 metres (200 ft). Several ecological communities are present on and near the Spit, from its outer beaches to dune ridges, wetlands, meadows, and forests. Its location on the East Atlantic Flyway means it is frequently visited by migratory waterfowl. Between 10 and 20 million birds fly over the feature during spring and autumn migrations, and many pause to rest or breed there.

Both the Russian and Lithuanian parts of the spit are national parks.

The settlements of the Curonian Spit (from north to south) are:

- Smiltynė
- Alksnynė
- Juodkrantė
- Pervalka
- Preila
- Nida
- Morskoe
- Rybachy
- Lesnoy

The first six are on the Lithuanian side, while the last three are on the Russian side. The Russian side of the Curonian Spit belongs to Zelenogradsky District of the Kaliningrad Oblast, while the Lithuanian side is partitioned among Klaipėda city municipality and Neringa municipality in Klaipėda County.

There is a single road that traverses the whole length of the Curonian Spit. Car ferries provide a transportation link between Smiltynė, located on the spit, and the port town of Klaipėda.

UNESCO mark

Since 2000, the Curonian Spit has been on UNESCO's World Heritage List under cultural criterion "V" ("an outstanding example of a traditional human settlement, land-use, or sea-use which is representative of a culture [...], or human interaction with the environment especially when it has become vulnerable under the impact of irreversible change").

As of March 2012, there was a demand to demolish a number of homes on the Curonian Spit. These homes are owned by people who were given permits to build by local government officials. The demand to demolish the homes is due to the Spit being a UN World Heritage Site, and the only structures that were to be allowed outside official settlements were fishing huts.

== Tourism ==
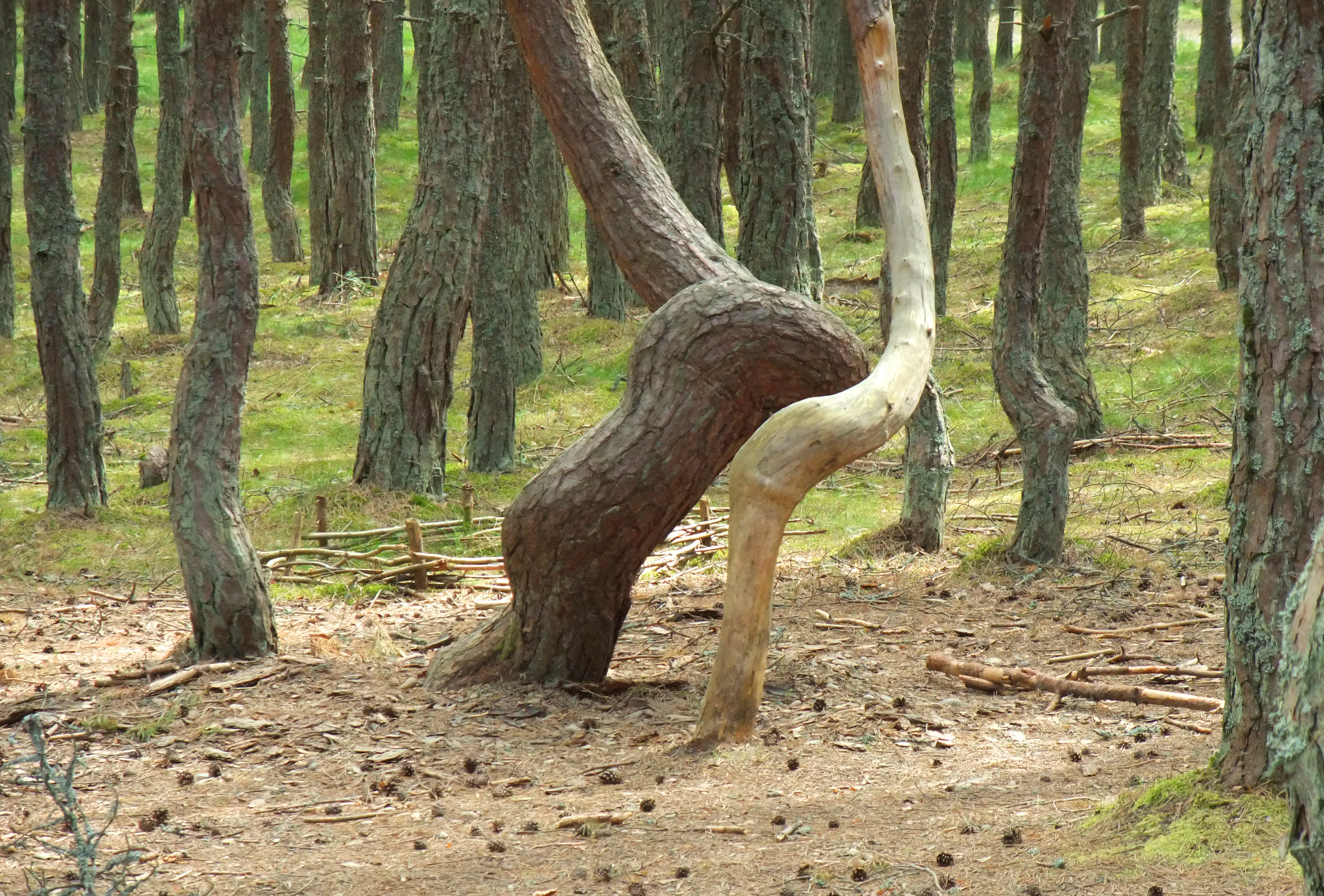
The Dancing Forest

The largest town on the spit is Nida in Lithuania, a holiday resort, mostly frequented by Lithuanian and German tourists.

=== Parnidis dune and sundial ===
Parnidis sand dune, subjected to drift by harsh winds, is rising up to 52 metres (171 ft) above sea level. Local residents believe that the name Parnidis comes from the phrase meaning "passed across Nida", because this wind-blown dune has several times passed through the village of Nida. Scientists estimated that each person climbing or descending on the steep dune slopes moves several tons of sand, so hikers are allowed to climb only in designated paths.

There is a granite sundial built on Parnidis dune in 1995 that accurately shows the time. The sundial was rebuilt in 2011 following storm damage. The sundial is a stone pillar 13.8 metres (45 ft) high and weighing 36 tonnes (35 long tons; 40 short tons). It consists in small steps covered with granite slabs, carved with hour and half-hour notches, as well as one notch for each month, and four additional notches for solstices and equinoxes. From the astronomical point of view Parnidis dune is an ideal place for the sundial in Lithuania.

== Environmental concerns ==
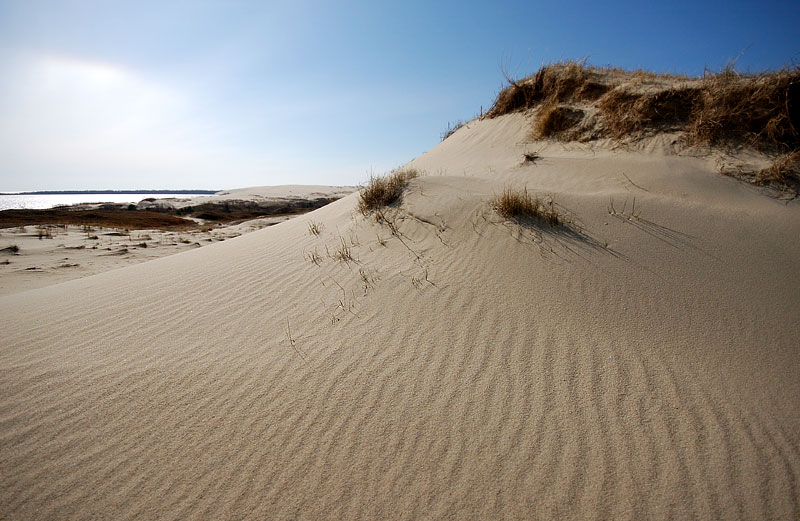
The Curonian Spit is known for its fine sandy beaches (Nida, Lithuania).

There are environmental concerns related to the Curonian Spit, which is often promoted as a refuge of clean nature.

Due to the importance of tourism and fishing for the regional economy, pollution of sea and coastlines may have disastrous effects for the area as the unique nature and the economy would be damaged.

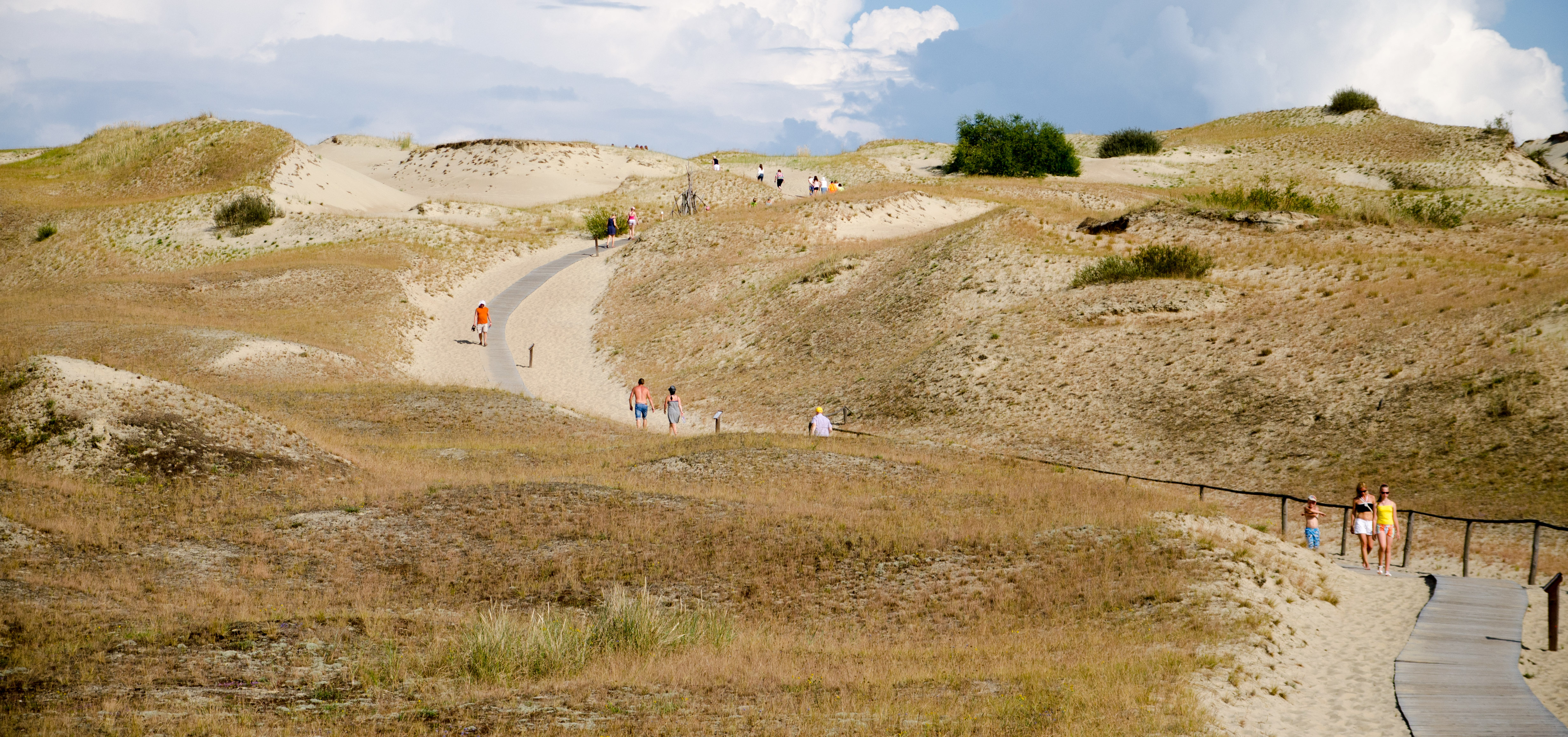
Sand dunes near Nida, Lithuania

The construction of an offshore drilling facility (the Kravtsovskoye (D-6) oilfield) in the territorial waters of Russia, 22.5 km (14.0 mi) from the coastline of the Curonian Spit raised concerns over possible oil spills. Between 2002 and 2005 local environmentalists in Kaliningrad Oblast and Lithuania protested against Lukoil's plans to exploit the oilfield, objecting to the possible great damage to the environment and tourism (a vital source of income in the area) in case of oil leakage. These concerns did not engender support in the government of Russia. They were, however, supported by the government of Lithuania. The oilfield is about 4 km (2.5 mi) from the boundary of Lithuanian territorial waters; the prevailing northward currents means that the Lithuanian coastlines would receive much potential damage in case of leakage. Opposition to the operation of D-6 met little international support, and the oil platform was opened in 2004. During the first decade of the 21st century the two states agreed to a joint environmental impact assessment of the D-6 project, including plans for oil spill mitigation. The assessment and mitigation project had not been completed as of 2010. ^{[needsupdate]}

Another concern is that increased tourism destroys the very nature that attracts it. For this reason, protective measures have been taken, such as banning tourists from hiking in certain areas of the spit.

Natural hazards are more dangerous in the Curonian Spit than elsewhere in Lithuania or the Kaliningrad Oblast. For example, storms tend to be stronger there. Due to the importance of trees in preventing soil erosion, forest fires that happen in summer are more dangerous to the ecology.

== See also ==
- Kuršių Nerija National Park
- Curonian Spit National Park (Russia)
- Vecekrugas dune
- Vistula Spit
