= Lake Half =

Lake in the Northland Region of New Zealand

- Location within Northland Region
- Location: Northland Region, North Island
- Coordinates: 34.7366°S 172.9985°E
- Basin countries: New Zealand

Lake Half is a lake in the Northland Region of New Zealand.

== See also ==
- List of lakes in New Zealand
