= Smiltynė =

Village in Lithuania

Coordinates: 55°42′22″N 21°06′40″E

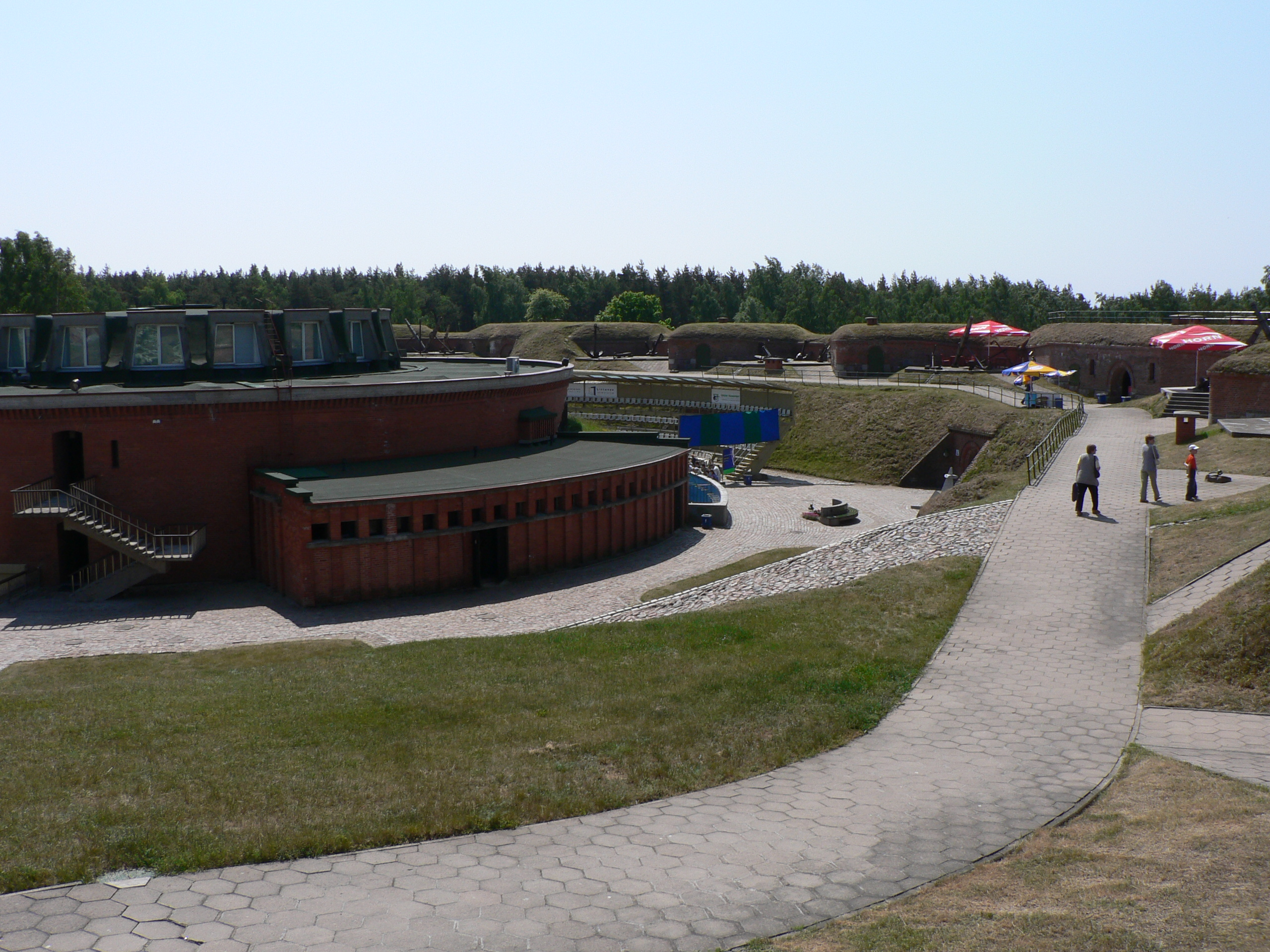
The Kopgalis Fort, often confused with Smiltynė, now housing an aquarium.

Smiltynė (German: Sandkrug) is a part of Klaipėda city municipality in Lithuania. It is located on the northern tip of the Curonian Spit, next to Kopgalis, which is at the very tip of the spit pointing into the narrow strait which connects the Curonian Lagoon to the Baltic Sea. Across the 0.5-kilometre wide (0.31 mi) strait, on the Lithuanian mainland, is the port city of Klaipėda. Ferries transport vehicles and people daily between the two cities across the strait, as there is no connecting bridge. Smiltynė serves as a public beach for Klaipėda residents, as ports take up the coastline around Klaipėda.

The village began as a travel point between Memel (present-day Klaipėda) and Königsberg (present-day Kaliningrad). Travelers would stay to rest or wait for better weather to cross the strait. Smiltynė is first mentioned in 1429. An inn and tavern were built in 1525. It largely depends on travelers for revenue, and thus was hurt during the wars of the 19th and 20th century. Until the beginning of the 20th century, the village was just an inn with a handful of fishermen's houses, but later turned into a popular resort among wealthy residents of Klaipėda.

Smiltynė became part of the Klaipėda municipality in 1897, and soon afterwards it became legal to sell land to individuals. In 1901 a large, luxurious, and popular two-storey hotel with a restaurant and casino was built and was named the Kurhaus; other villas were built as well. However, after World War II, the luxury lifestyle of the village came to an end. Many older buildings have survived to this day, most having been refurbished. Most of the populace moved away as well, and today only about fifty full-time residents remain.

North of Smiltynė is a small cemetery, used before World War II. The village also has a nature museum, which educates visitors about the geology, changing landscape, and unique fauna and flora of the spit. Just a few hundred meters away from the Kurhaus there is pier big enough to accommodate up to 100 yachts. With a modern hotel and restaurant, it is a popular spot for international yachters.
