= Reedling =

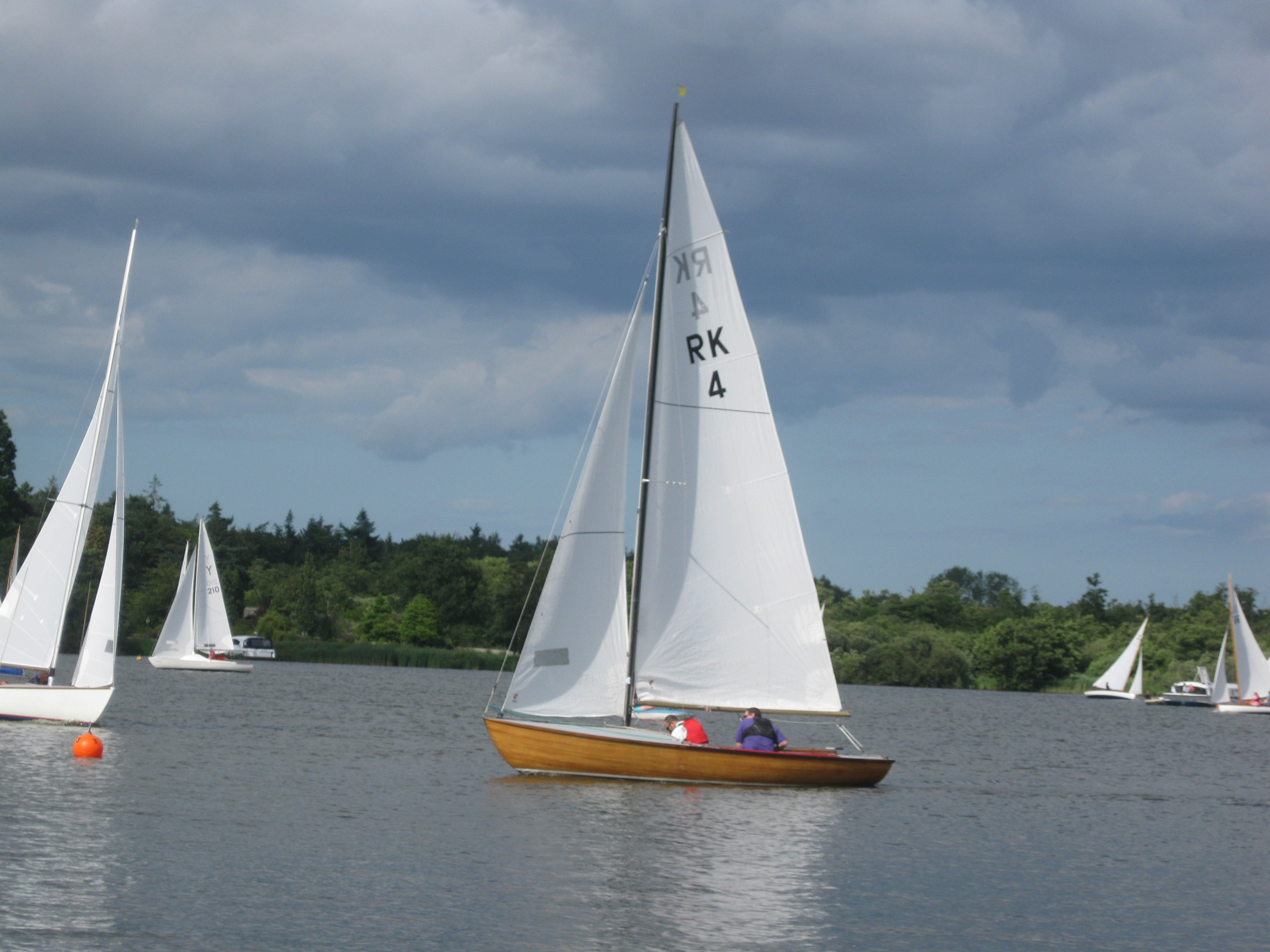
- Reedling RK4

Development
- Designer: Ian Proctor
- Year: 1963
- Design: One-design
- Builder: Reedling Yachts Ltd
- Name: Reedling

Boat
- Crew: 2
- Draft: 2.75 ft (0.84 m)

Hull
- Type: Monohull
- Construction: Wood
- Hull weight: 1,065 lb (483 kg)
- LOA: 19.08 ft (5.82 m)
- LWL: 15.58 ft (4.75 m)
- Beam: 6.08 ft (1.85 m)

Hull appendages
- Keel: Fixed

Rig
- Rig type: Fractional rig

Sails
- Mainsail area: 149.5 ft^{2} (13.89 m^{2})
- Jib/genoa area: 75 ft^{2} (7.0 m^{2})
- Spinnaker area: 240 ft^{2} (22 m^{2})

The Reedling is a one-design, fractional rigged keelboat designed and built by Reedling Yachts Ltd (now dissolved), Horning, Norfolk, UK.
The Reedling's class flag is the International Code of Signals Flag for the letter K.

== History ==
There were only 11 Reedlings built, starting in 1963:

Name	Sail number	Registration year
Reedling	RK1	1963
Siskin	RK2	1964
Cockatrice	RK3	1964
Jaws	RK4	1964
Rubicon	RK5	1969
Osiris	RK6	1982
Aku	RK7	1965
Swallow	RK8	1965
Bullrush	RK9	1985
Onyx	RK10	1972
Vole	RK11	1973

== International competition ==
The Reedling class of keelboat is only raced at Horning Sailing Club, based in the Reeding's home village of Horning, Norfolk, UK.
