= Curonian Spit National Park (Russia) =

National park in Russia

- Куршская коса (Russian); Also: Kurshskaya Kosa
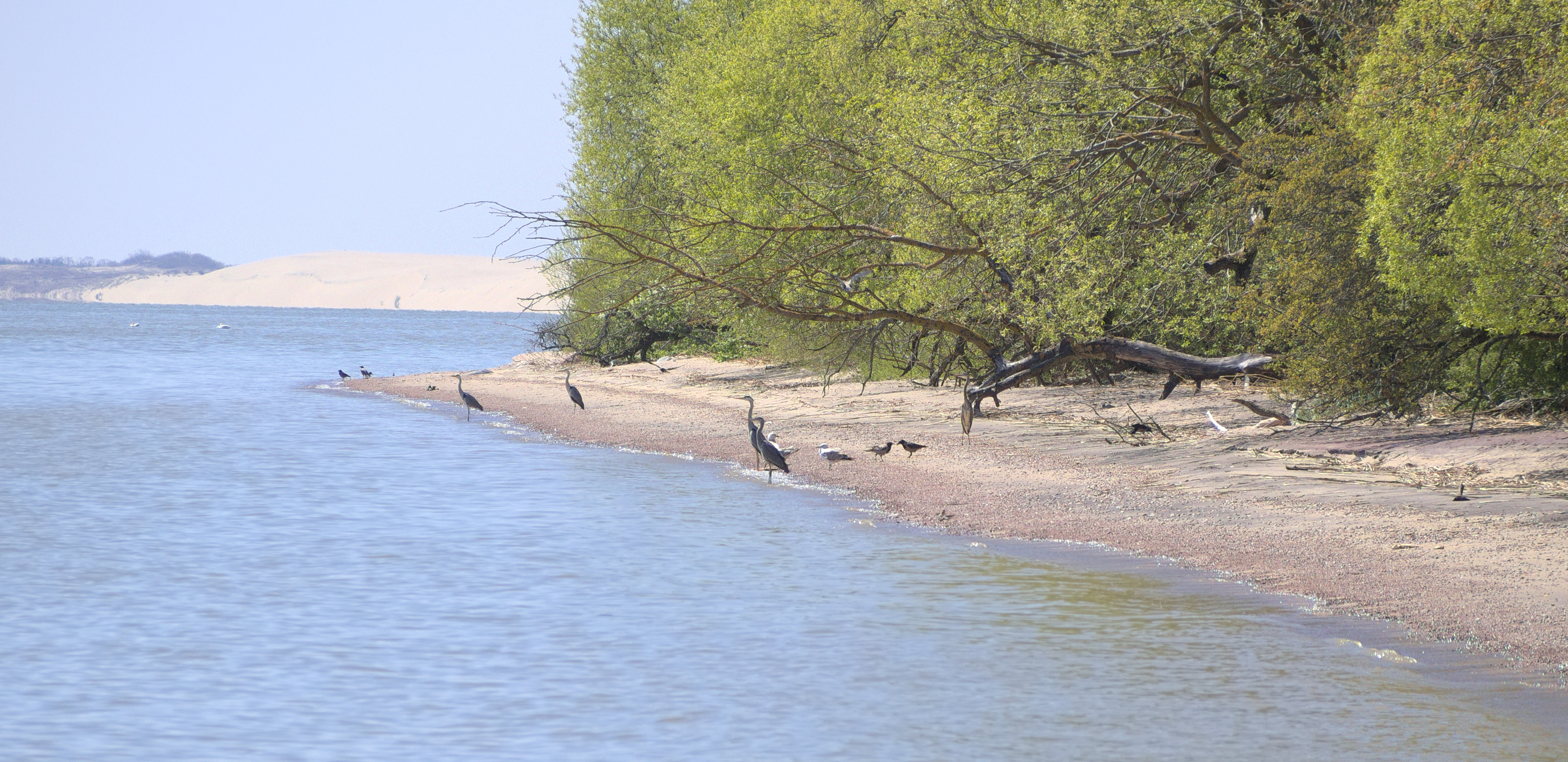
- Curonian Spit

- Location within Russia
- Location: Kaliningrad Oblast
- Nearest city: Kaliningrad
- Coordinates: 55°08′N 20°48′E
- Area: 6,621 hectares (16,361 acres; 66 km^{2}; 26 sq mi)
- Established: 1987
- Governing body: Ministry of Natural Resources and Environment (Russia)

Curonian Spit National Park (Russian: Национальный парк «Куршская коса») covers the Russian-owned southern 41 km of the 98 km long, curved Curonian Spit – a type of depositional sandbar. The spit separates the salt-water Baltic Sea (on the west) from the freshwater Curonian Lagoon to the east. The southern portion of the spit lies within Zelenogradsky District in Kaliningrad Oblast, Russia; the northern portion lies within southwestern Lithuania. It is a UNESCO World Heritage Site shared by the two countries.

== Topography ==
The foundations of the spit were created about 15,000 BCE as the receding glaciers left the Baltic Sea behind, and the sand dunes of the Curonian built on the glacial moraine. The actions of sea and wind build large dunes, which average 35 meters on the spit. The area is one of high biodiversity due to the many different ecological communities in close proximity to each other: beach, dune ridge, wetlands of various types, meadows and forests. The Curonian Spit is the second longest spit in the world, after the 110-km long Arabat Spit in the Sea of Azov. The park follows the spit from the Sambian Peninsula in the south to the border with Lithuania about 40 km north; its width varies from 0.4 to 4 km. The water in the lagoon averages 3.7 meters in depth, and the water level of the lagoon is about 12 cm above that of the Baltic.

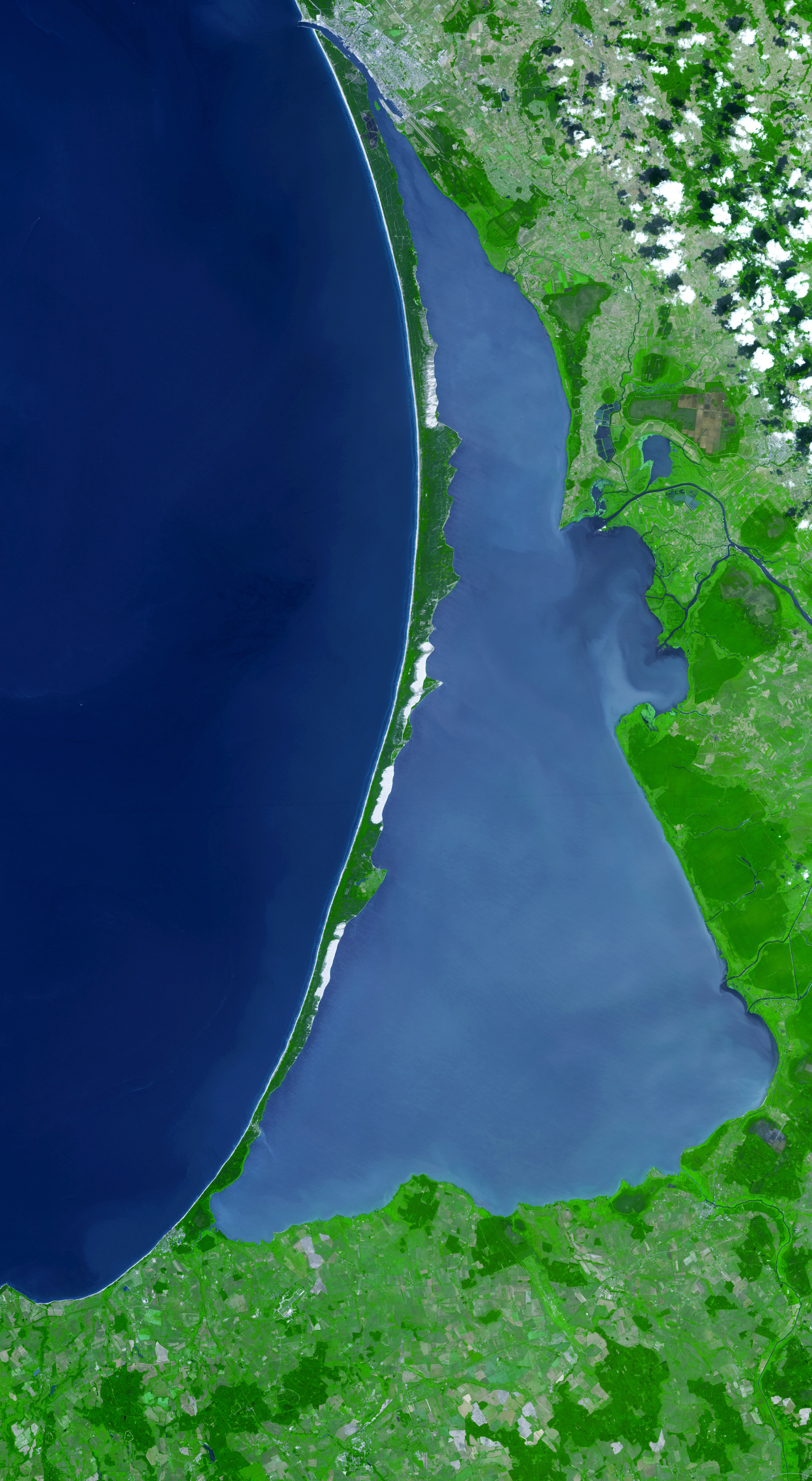
Curonian Spit (and Curonian Lagoon) from Space, 2006

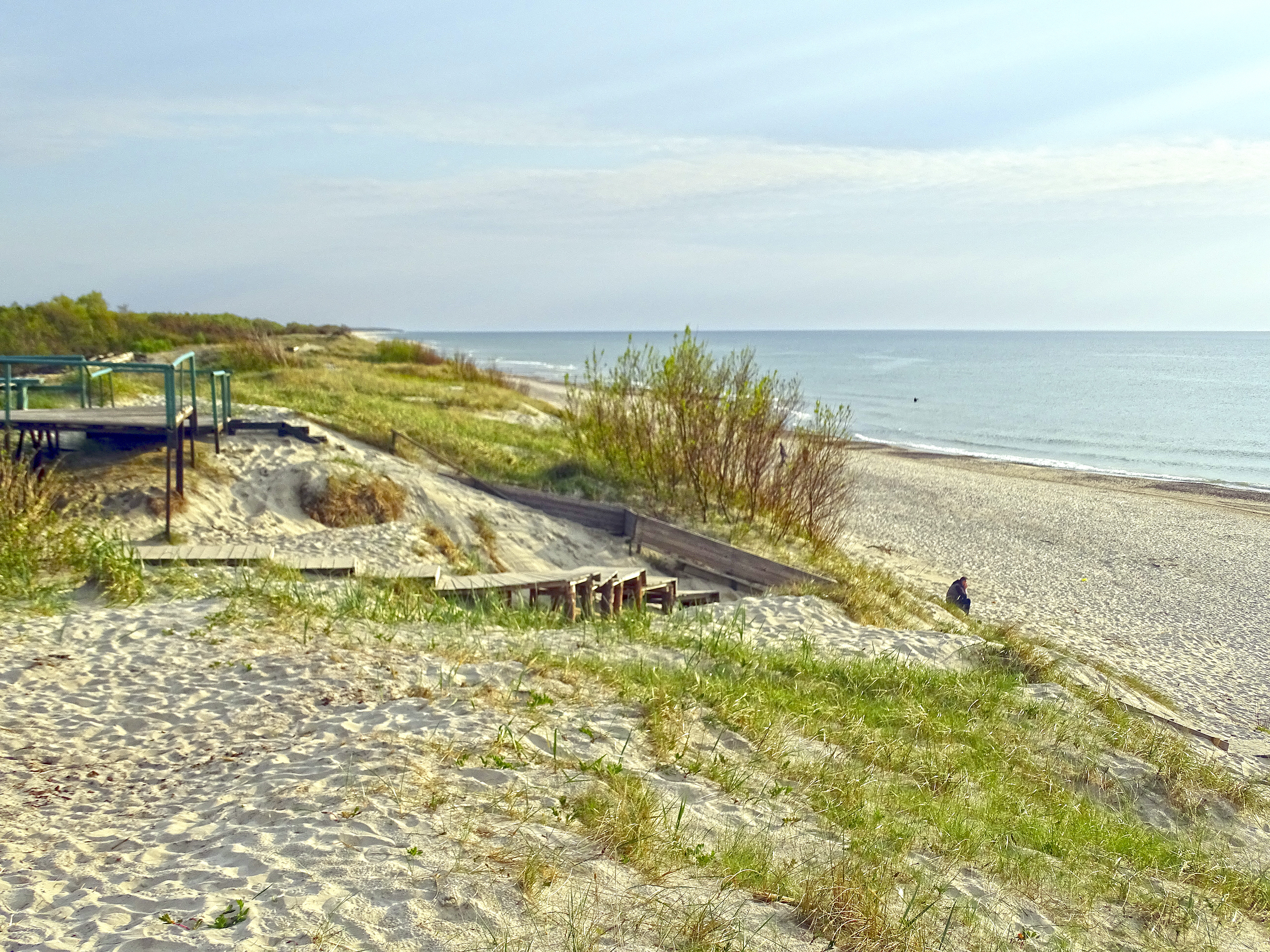
Beach in Kurshskaya Kosa National Park

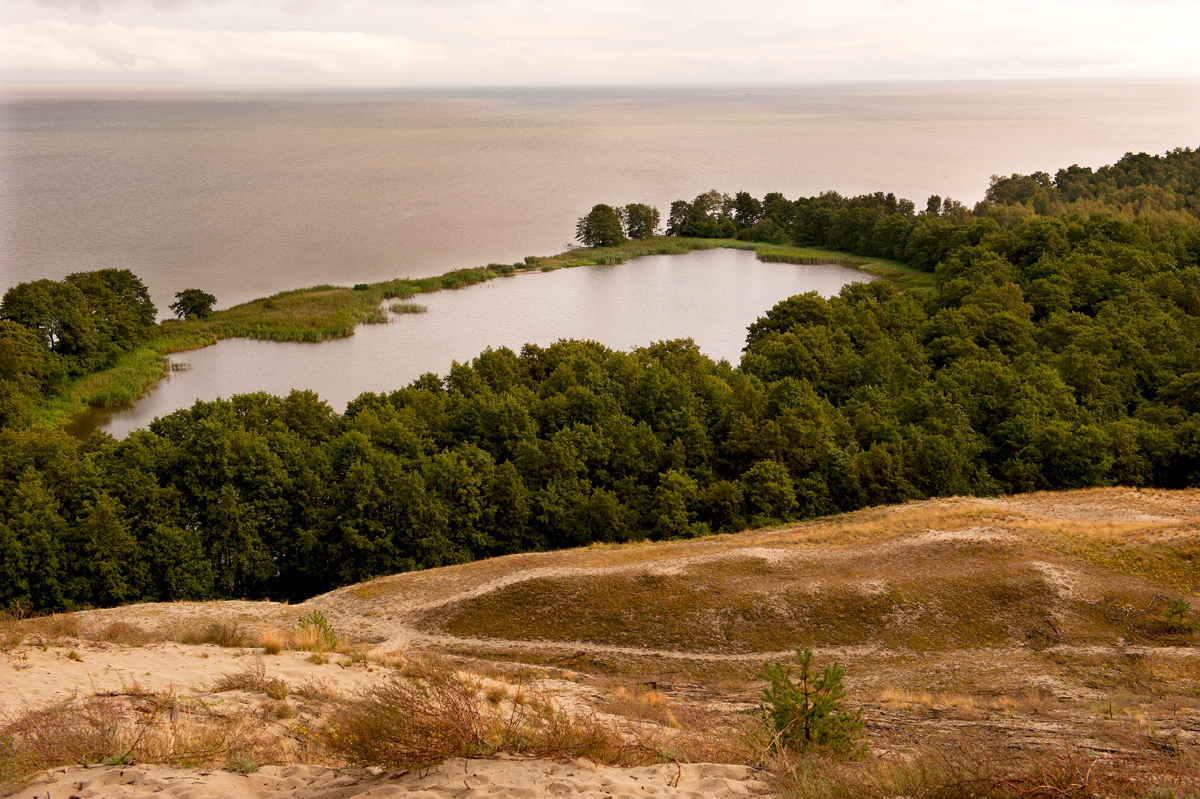
Swan Lake, Kurshskaya Kosa National Park

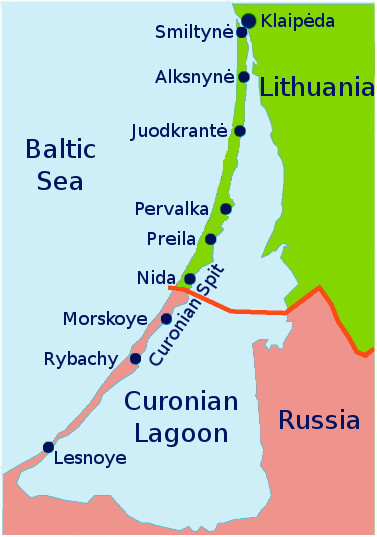
Map of Curonian Lagoon, spit to the west

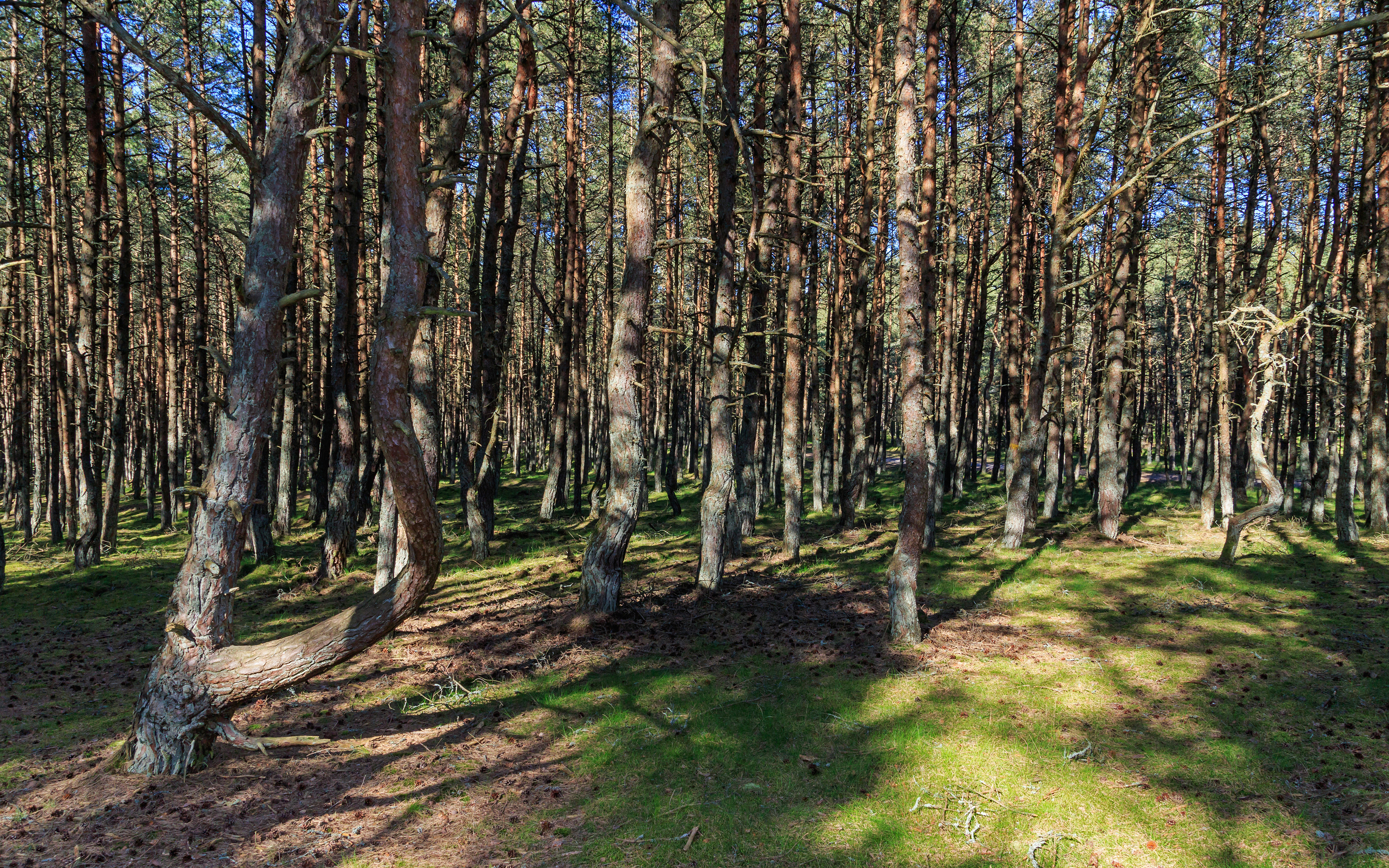
Dancing Forest

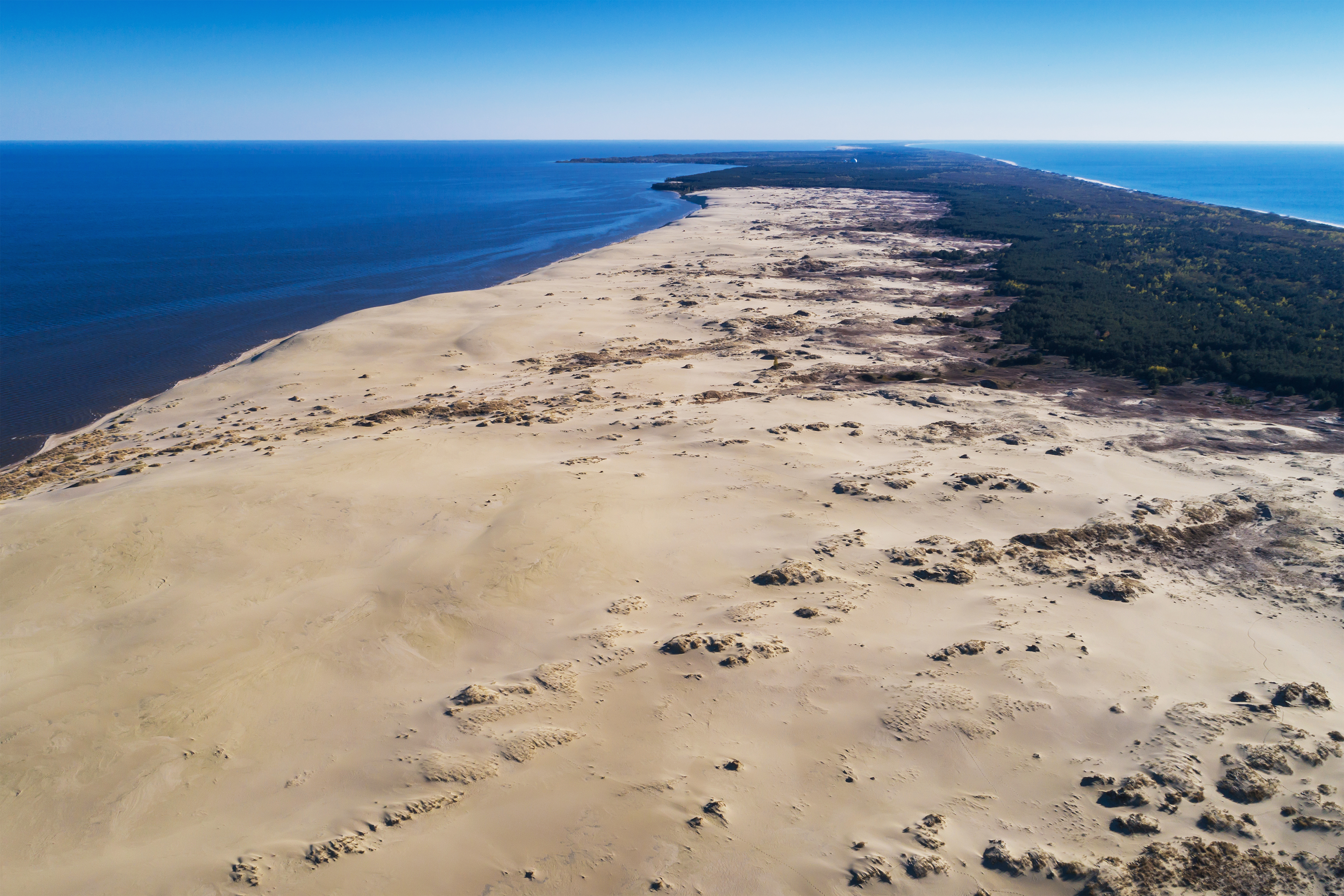
Epha Dune, aerial view

== Plants and animals ==
Birds and waterfowl are abundant, as the park has abundant wetlands and is on major migratory routes. 262 species of birds have been recorded in the park, and 100 are known to nest and breed in the territory. The park is also home to 46 species of mammals, including elk, European roe deer, wild boar, fox, marten, raccoon dog, badger, hare, red squirrel, and beaver. The park has recorded over 290 species of terrestrial vertebrates, representing 80% of the species found in the Kaliningrad region. Plant life is similarly varied: 889 species, hybrids, varieties and forms of wild vascular plants of 398 genera and 111 families.

== See also ==
- Curonian Spit National Park (Lithuania) - Neighboring park to the north in Lithuania
- Protected areas of Russia
- Nature reserves of Russia (zapovedniks)
