= Bulrush Lake (Northland) =

- Location within Northland Region
- Location: Northland Region, North Island
- Coordinates: 34°42′31″S 172°59′47″E
- Basin countries: New Zealand
- Max. depth: 2 metres (6 ft 7 in)

Bulrush Lake is a small lake on the Aupouri Peninsula in the Northland Region of New Zealand. It has a wetland area (possibly now drained) at its southwest end, but no flow outlet. On the north side of the lake there is an inflow drain. The catchment is predominantly pine forest and pasture, with a small amount scrub to the west.

== See also ==
- List of Lakes of New Zealand
