= Pervalka =

- Village
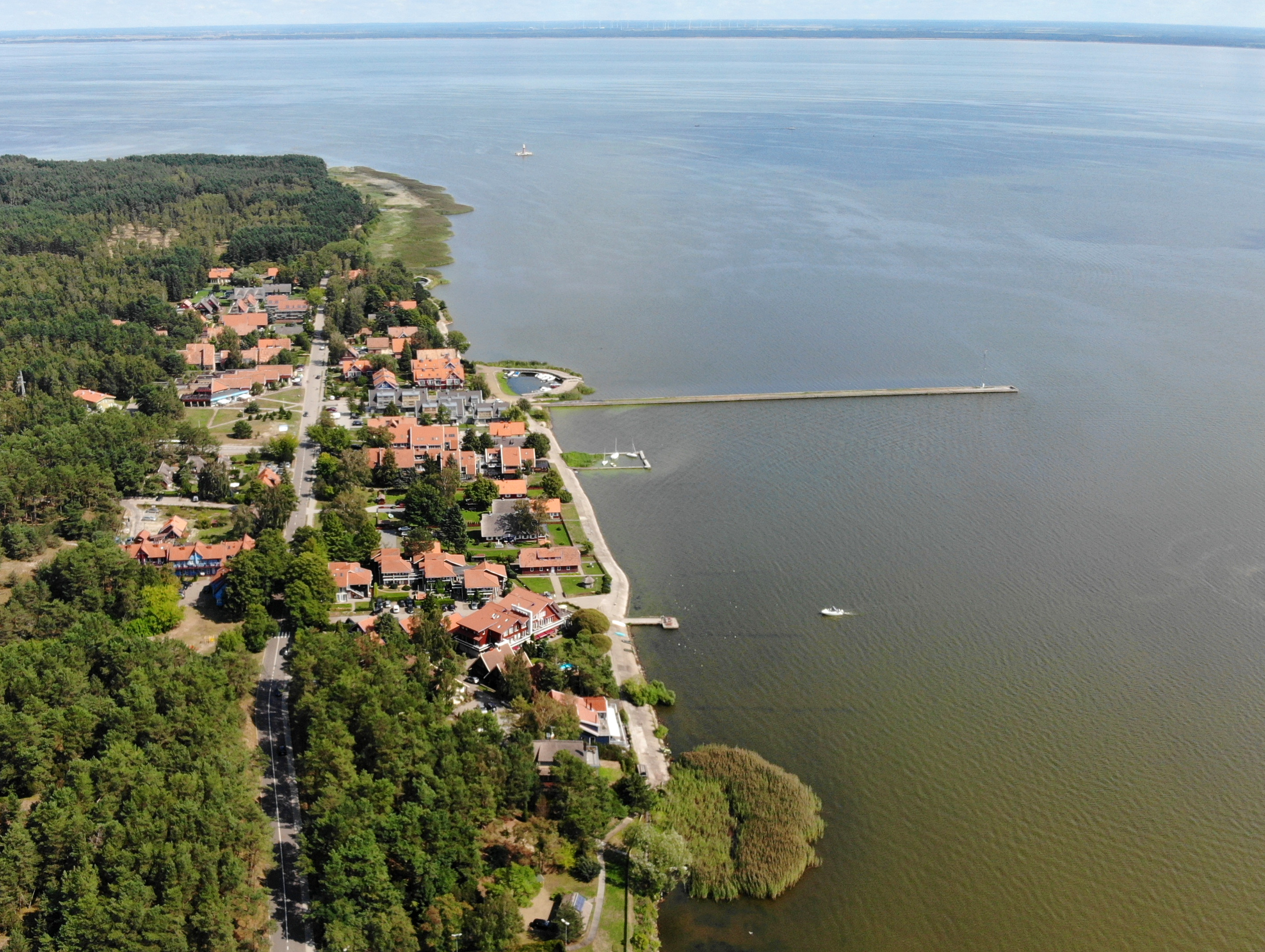
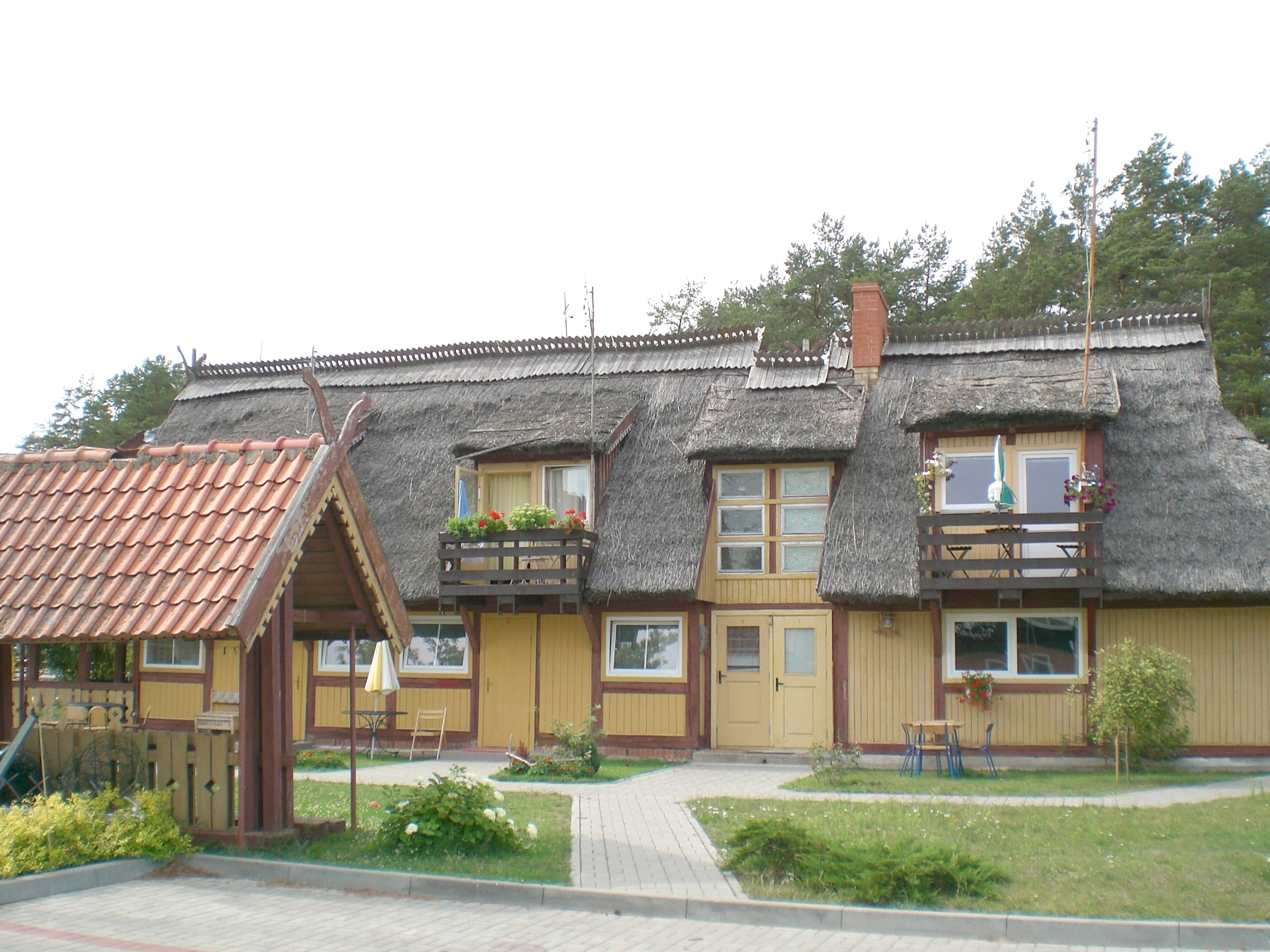
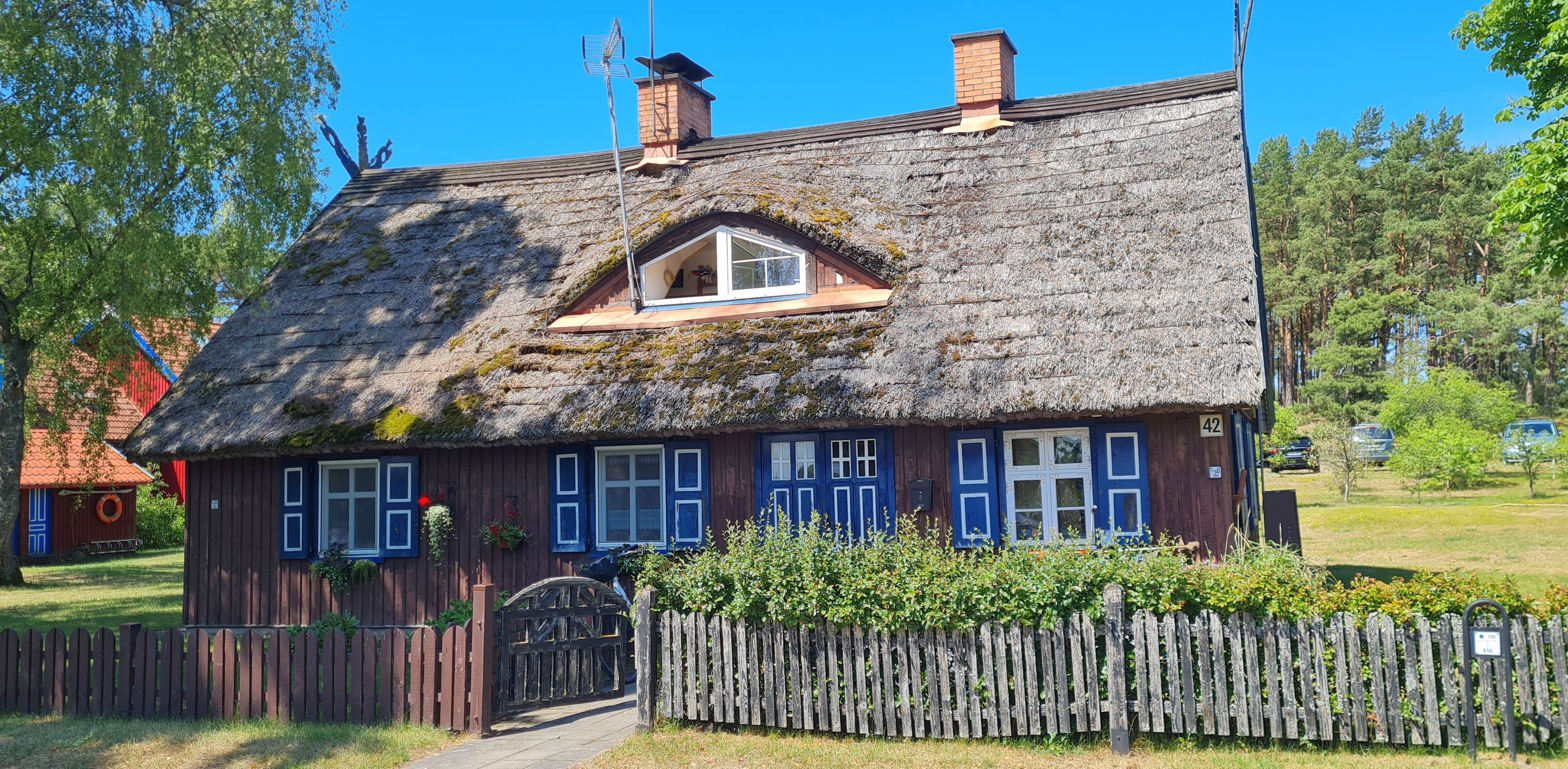
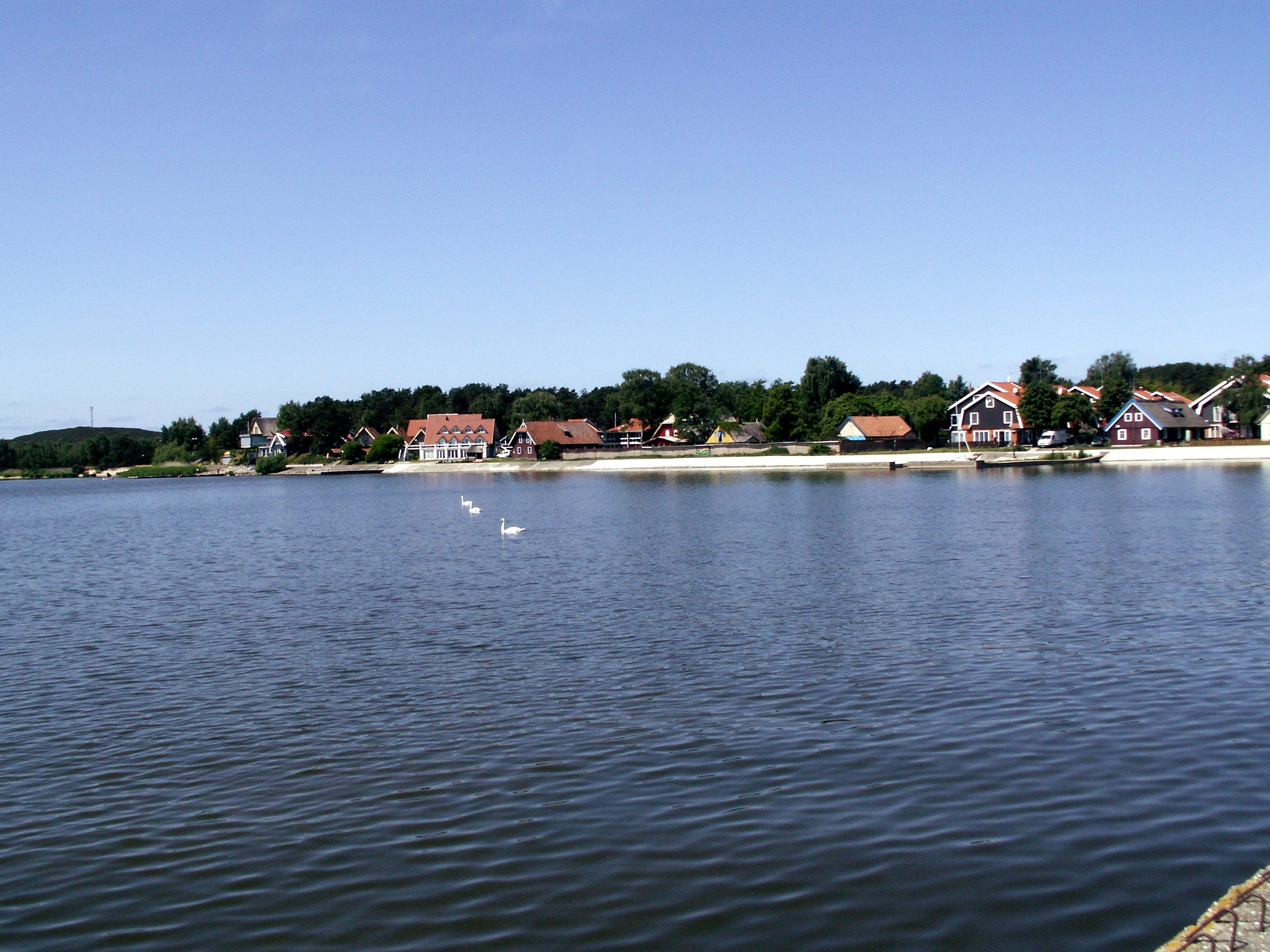
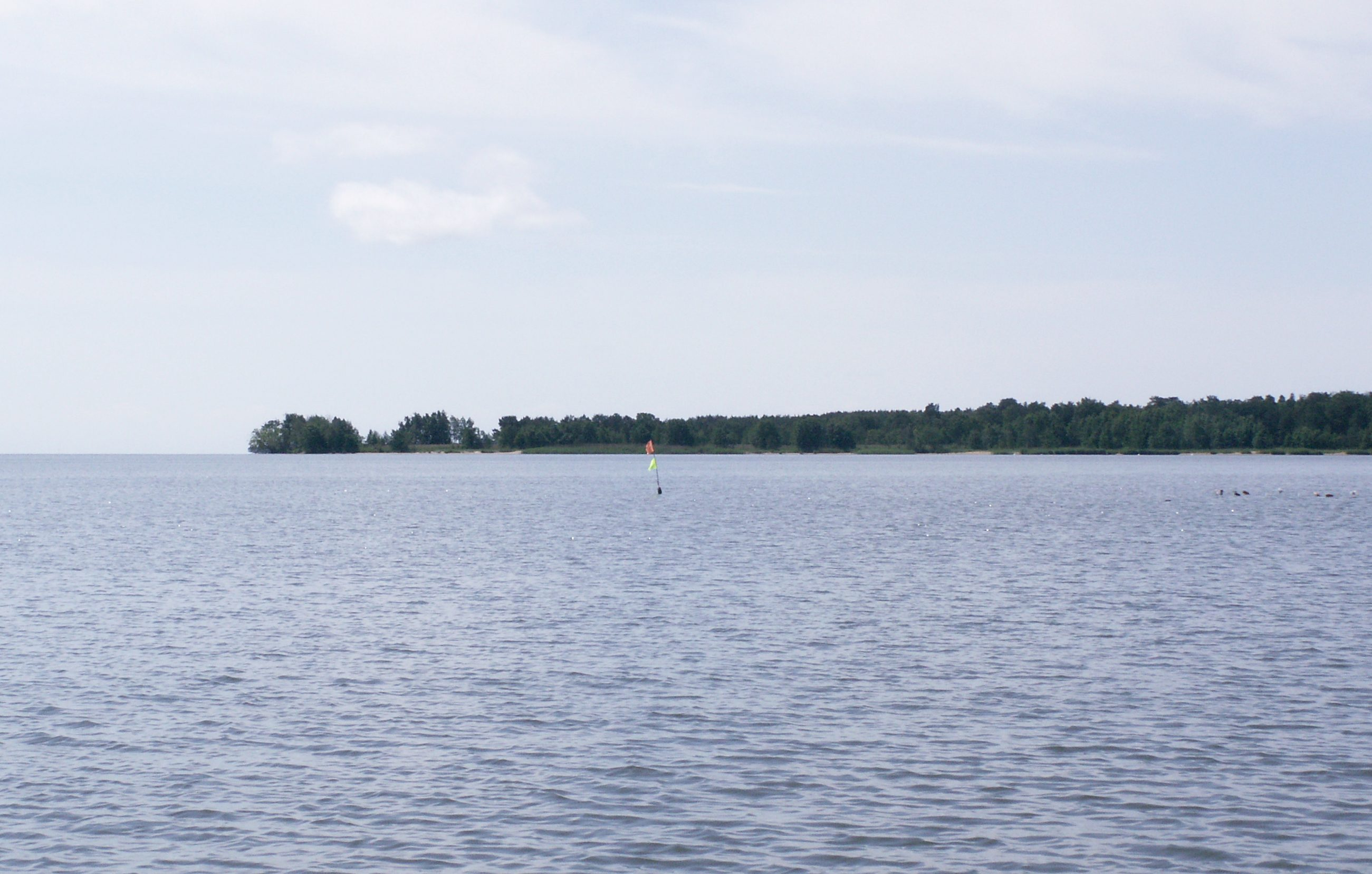
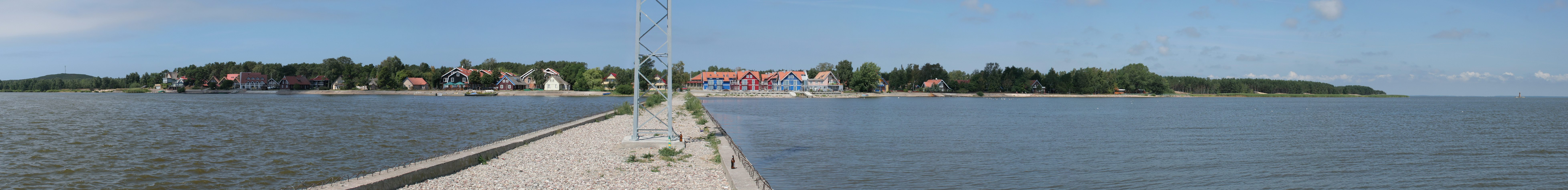
- Aerial view of Pervalka Traditional fisherman's house Traditional fisherman's house Coast of the Curonian Lagoon Pervalka Horn Panorama of the Pervalka Harbour

- Flag
- Interactive map of Pervalka
- Location within Lithuania
- Coordinates: 55°24′50″N 21°05′40″E
- Country: Lithuania
- County: Klaipėda County
- Municipality: Neringa Municipality
- Eldership: Preila–Pervalka Eldership
- Established: 1844

Population Unknown
  - Total: 4,500
- Time zone: UTC+2 (EET)
  - Summer (DST): UTC+3 (EEST)

Pervalka (Kursenieki: Pērvelka, German: Perwelk) is a small settlement located on the Curonian Spit in Klaipėda County, Lithuania. Administratively, it is part of the city of Neringa. It is located 5 km (3.1 mi) north from Preila and 15 km (9.3 mi) south of Juodkrantė on the shoreline of the Pervalka Bay. It is situated on the northern part of the Žirgai Cape and south of Pervalka Cape. The 2211 is a village access road which connects to the 167 road to Nida.

The village has surviving cottages from the 19th and 20th century, a free house, a marina, the D10 bicycle path from the village of Neringa (the path is 12 km to Nida). To the north of Pervalka stretches the Pilkosios sand dunes that can be accessed via a trail. Near the Arkliai cape in Pervalka there is a lighthouse, built in 1900. There is a dune 100 metres to the north of the village with an access road to the monument of Ludwig Rhesa (built in 1975 by sculptor and folk artist Eduardas Jonušas). In the south of the village, there is an old cemetery.
