= Preila =

- Village
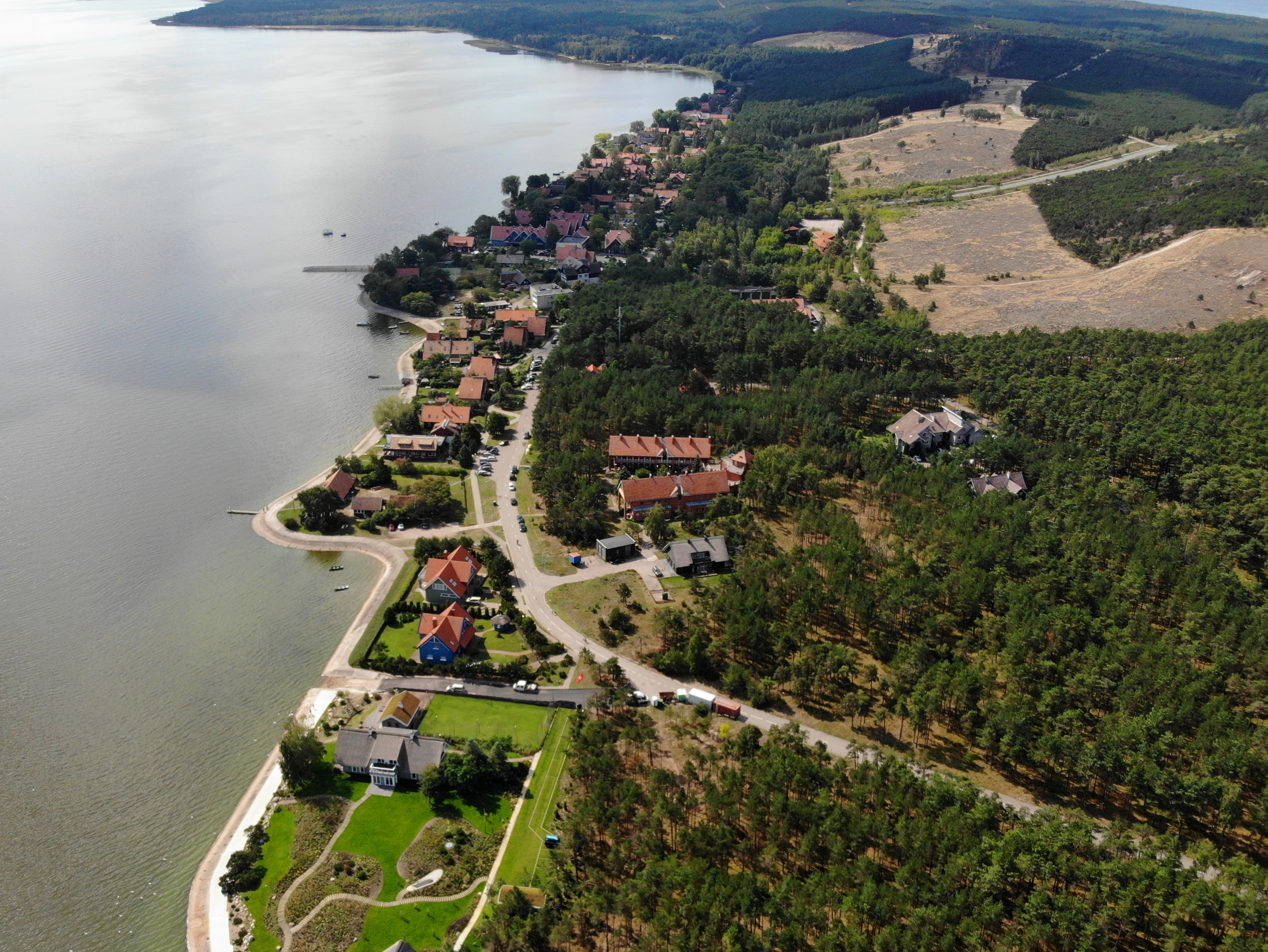
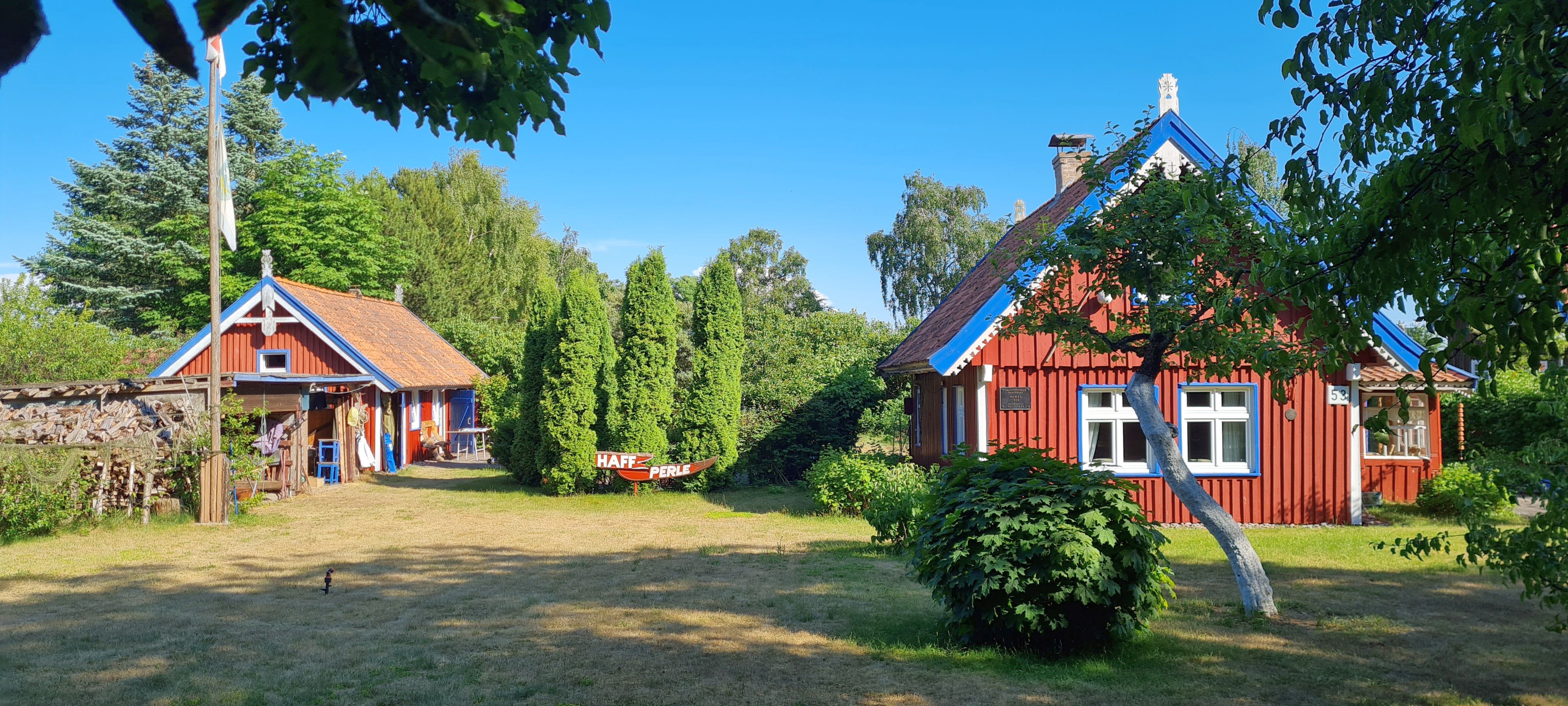
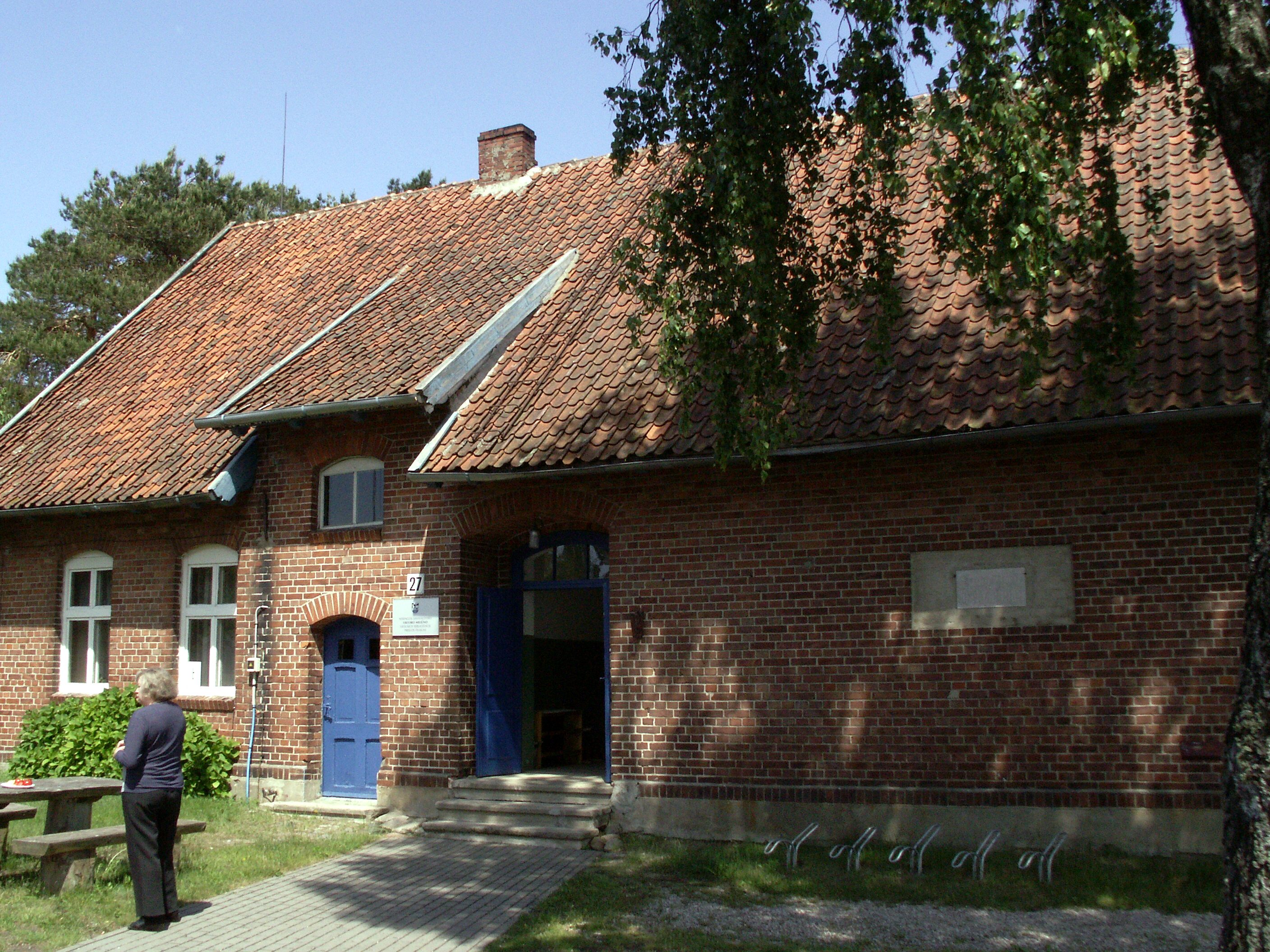
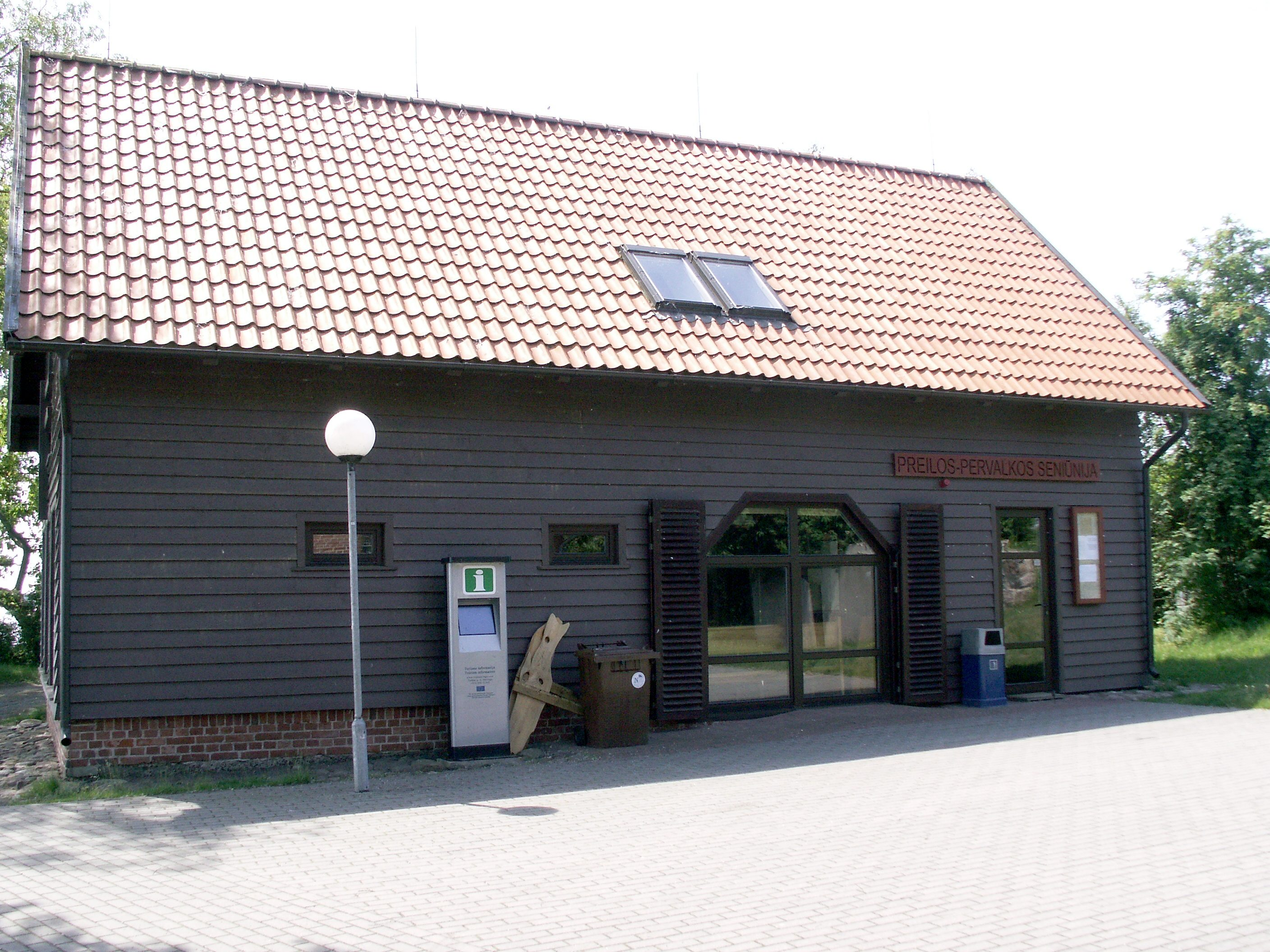
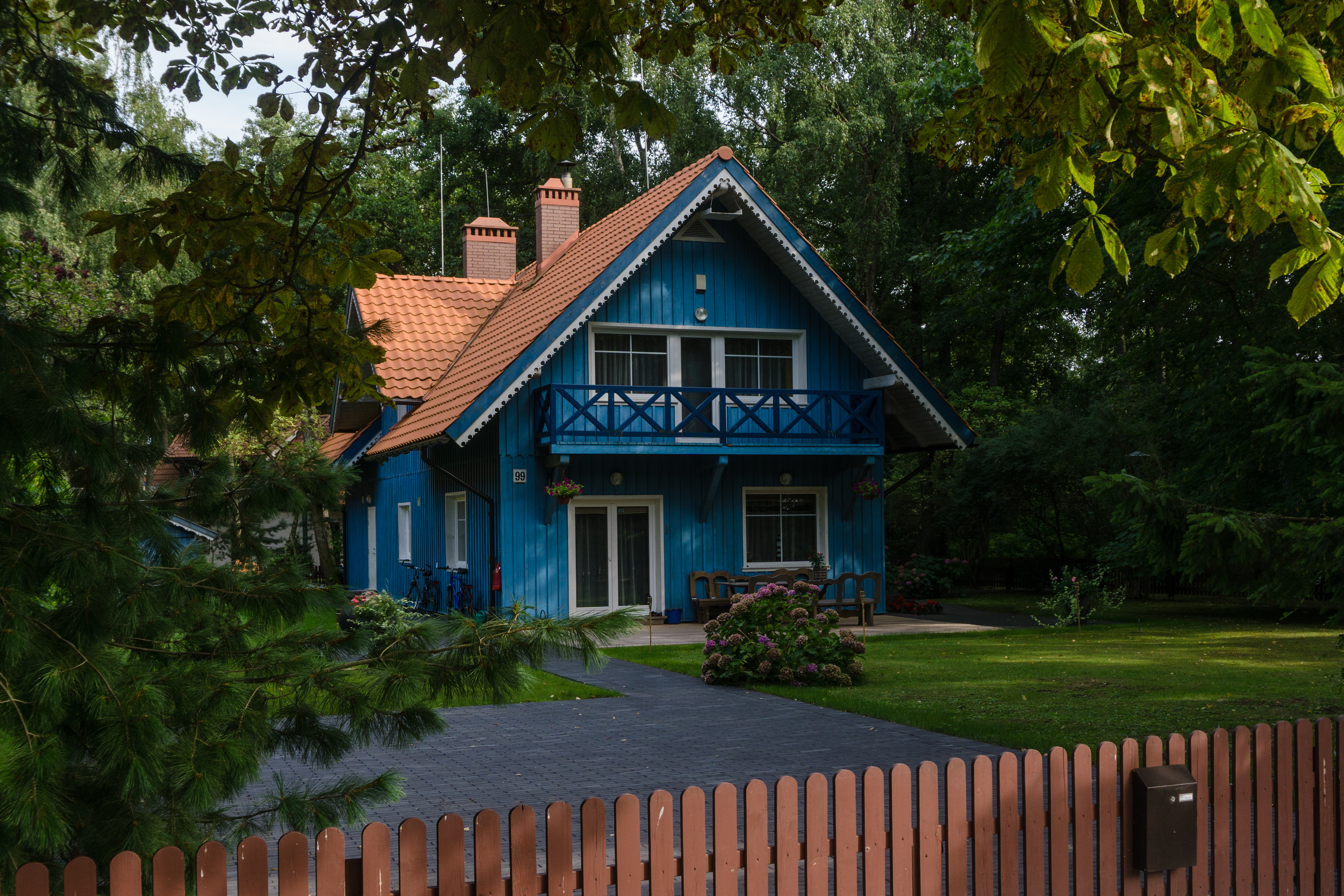
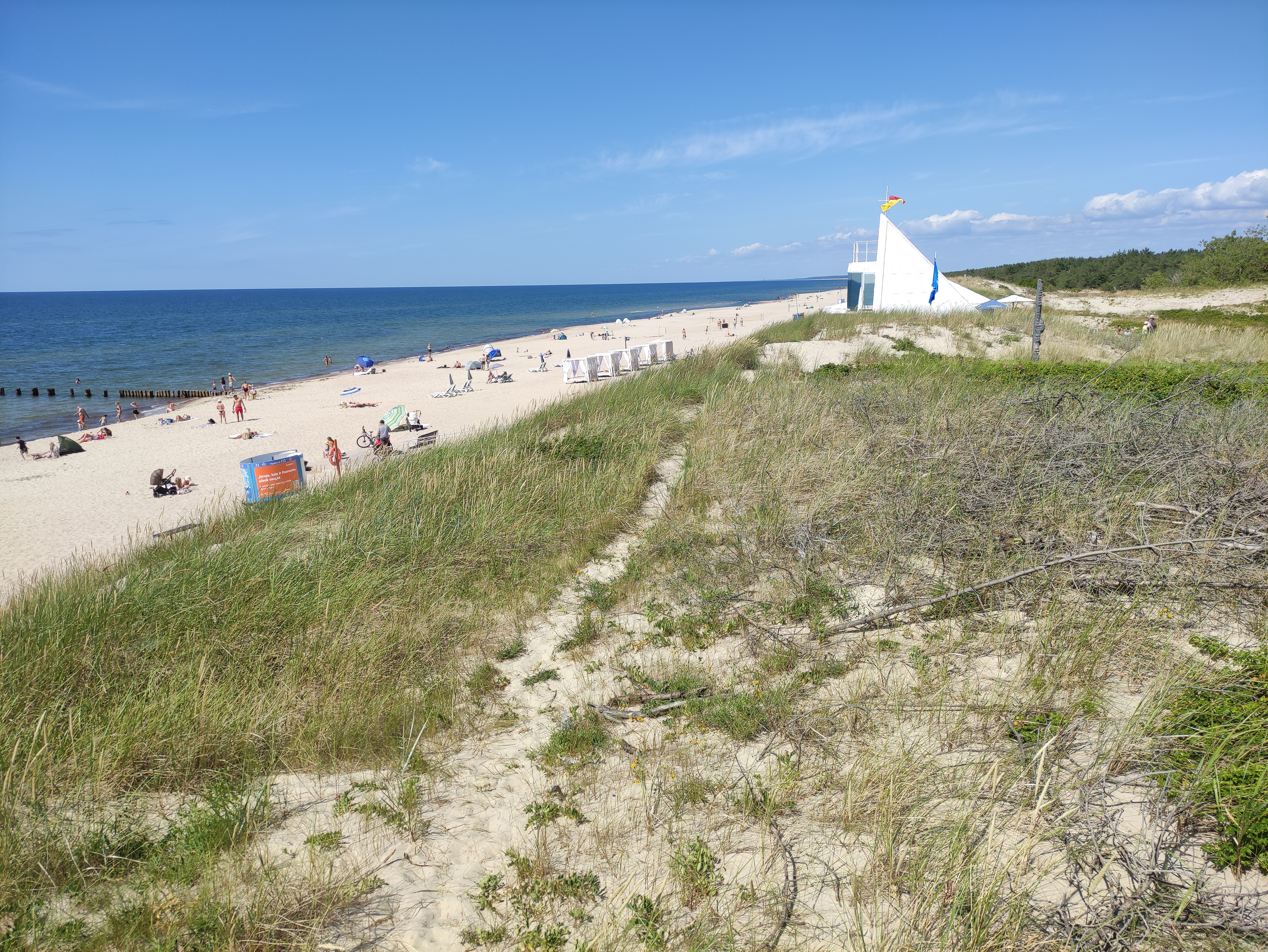
- Aerial view of Preila Traditional wooden homestead of fisherman Preila School Preila-Pervalka Parish Traditional wooden house Preila Beach

- Flag
- Interactive map of Preila
- Location within Lithuania
- Coordinates: 55°22′24″N 21°04′05″E
- Country: Lithuania
- County: Klaipėda County
- Municipality: Neringa Municipality
- Eldership: Preila-Pervalka Eldership

Population
  - Total: 205

Preila (Kursenieki: Preiļi or Prēle, German: Preil) is a settlement in the Neringa Municipality, Lithuania. It is located on the Preila Bay (north of the Goat Cape and south of the Small Preila Cape) of the Curonian Lagoon). Preila is situated about 2 kilometres (1.2 mi) away from the Baltic Sea and 6 kilometres (3.7 mi) north of Nida, which is a popular tourist destination. The village is surrounded by many dunes: Preila Hill (53 m), Vecekrugas Hill (67 m), and Karvaičiai Hill (59 m).

== Infrastructure ==
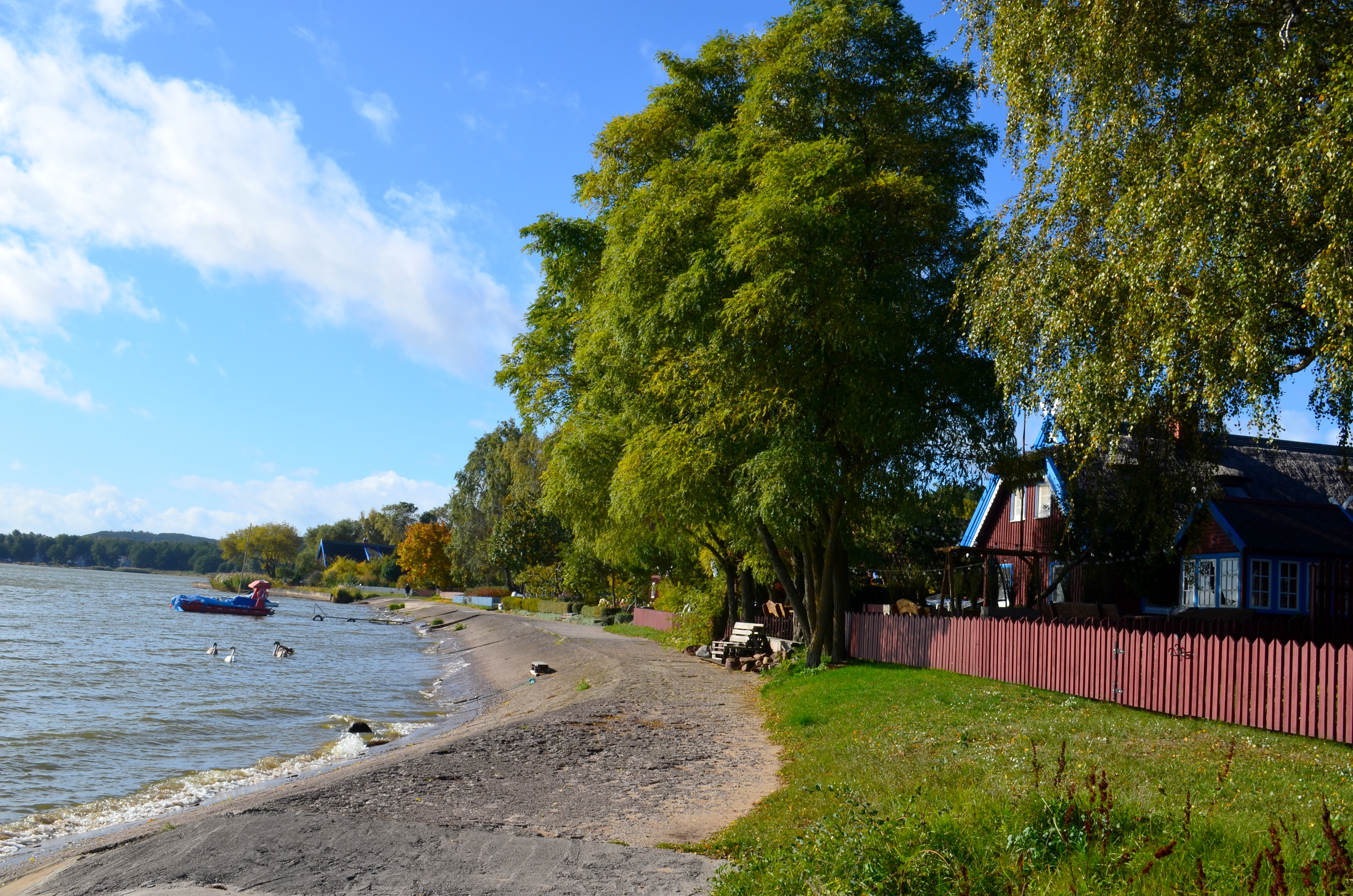
Preila Quay and fisherman's houses

The settlement is part of the Preila-Pervalka parish centre. Preila is on located on the main road 167 which runs around the bay, serving as a connection between Nida and Klaipėda. Many of the homes are for rent for summer holidaymakers. Most of the houses are from the 19th century, to the end of the twentieth century. There is a library which was built in 1954, and a marina which has connections to the nearby Nida. In the southern part of the settlement there is a folk cemetery. The Preila Neringa bike trail goes through the village connecting Nida and Juodkrantė.

== History ==
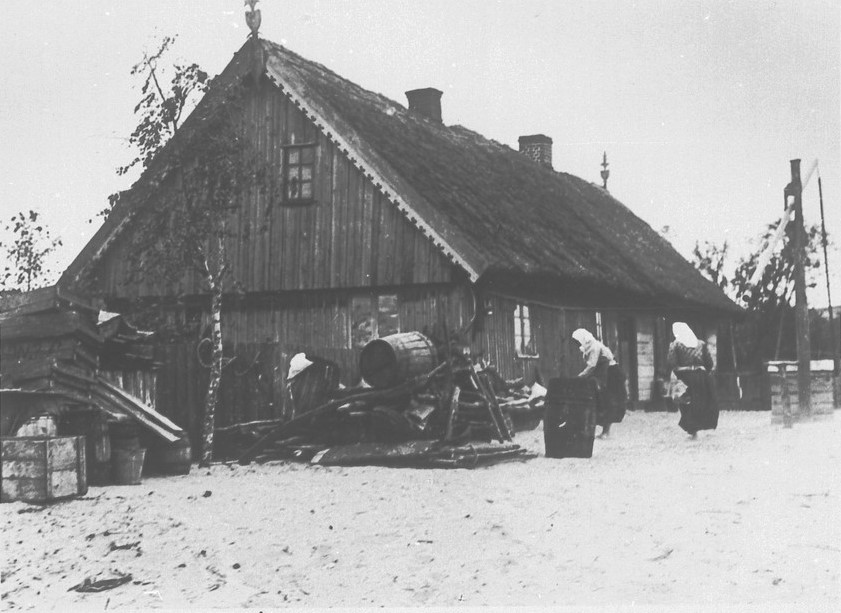
Traditional wooden house of a fisherman in Preila in circa 1920-1939

In 1843–1845, Preila was founded by the inhabitants of the village of Naujieji Nagliai which was buried under shifting sand dunes. In 1849, 84 people lived in Preila. In the same year, a village school moved from Naujieji Nagliai and opened in Preila. In 1907 a new building was built for the school. In the beginning of the 20th century there was already one hotel in Preila.

Although life in Preila was not easy, the number of inhabitants grew somewhat: 453 in 1864, 123 in 1871, 133 in 1895, 225 in 1897, 207 in 1905, 238 in 1919 and 250 in 1923. At present, the population of Preila is about 205 people.

In 1933, Preila was recognized as a resort. It was connected by a road to Klaipėda in 1947. In 1961, Preila was administratively incorporated into the Neringa city.
