= Vecekrugas Dune =

Dune in Lituania

Coordinates: 55°21′16″N 21°2′19″E

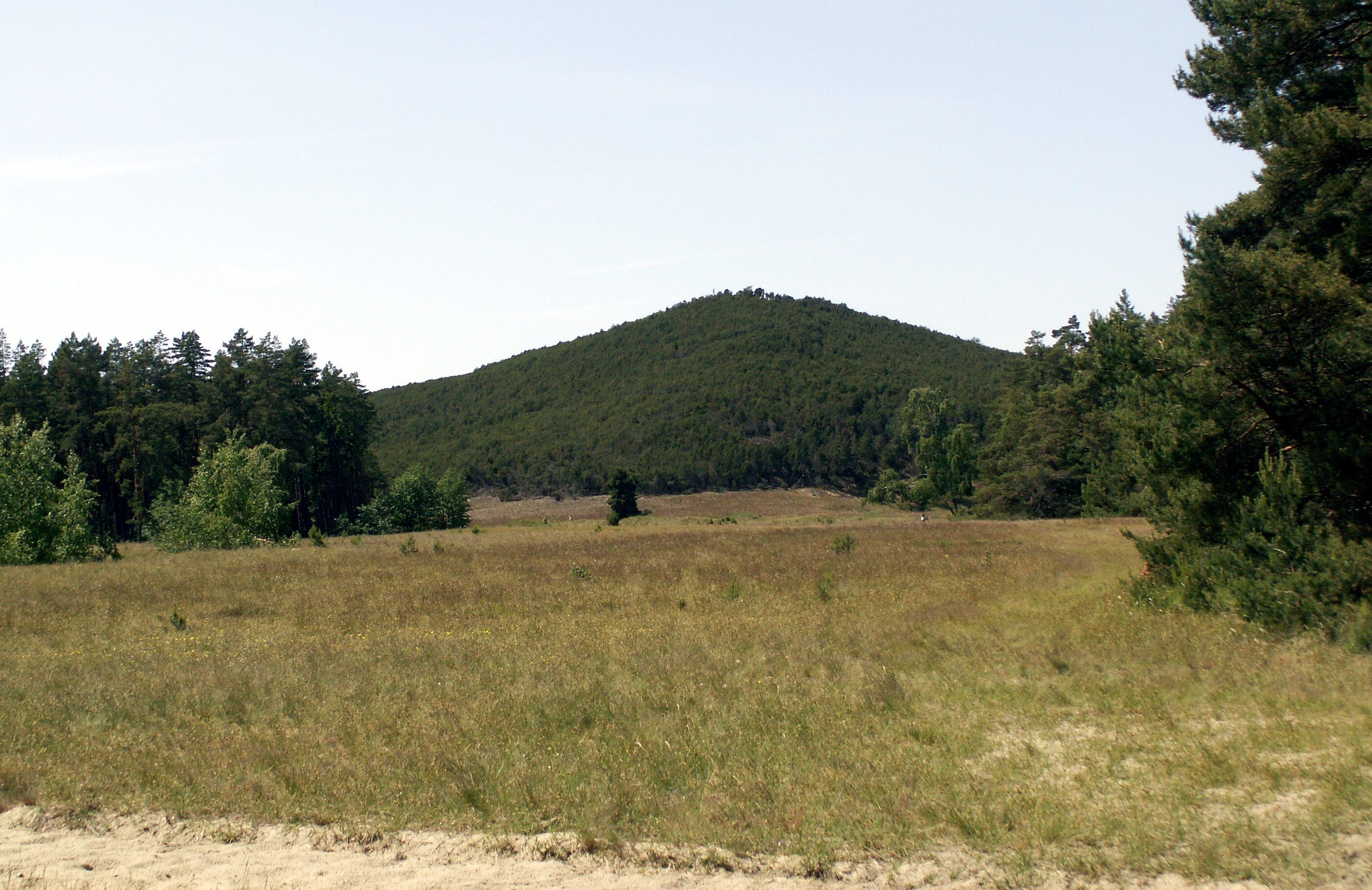
Vecekrugas Dune

The Vecekrugas Dune (Lithuanian: Vecekrugo kopa) also called the Vecekrugas Hill (Lithuanian: Vecekrugo kalnas) is a forested dune on the Curonian Spit, Lithuania 1.5 kilometres (0.93 mi) south of Preila. At the height of about 67.2 metres (220 ft) over the sea level, it is the highest dune on the spit.

The dune's name is derived from the Curonian language ("vece" + "kruogs" = "old" + "tavern") and allegedly refers to a small tavern at the foot of the dune, which is also reflected in the other Lithuanian name of the dune: Old Tavern Hill or Senosis smuklės kalnas.

The formation of the whole Curonian Spit dune ridge started in the 16–17th centuries due to massive deforestation. Blown by the sea wind, the sands started moving from the Baltic Sea inland, burying forests and villages. Eventually, locals started fighting the sand with barriers and planting of trees and grass. Today, Vecekrugas Dune is covered by mountain pines. The trees have been planted there since the mid-19th century with seedlings brought from Denmark. This serves as a good example of sand dune stabilization.

There is an observation deck at the top of the dune with the views of the lagoon, the sea, and the pine forests of Nida and Preila.

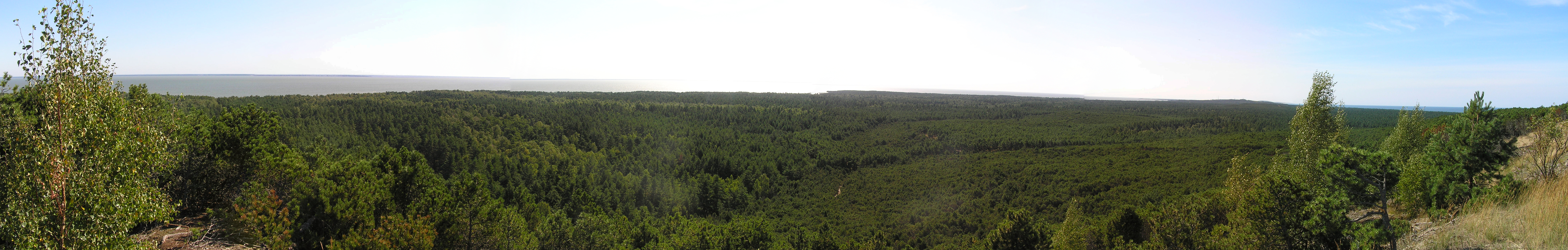
Panorama from the dune southwestwards
