= Neringa Municipality =

Neringa municipality Neringos savivaldybė
- City Municipality
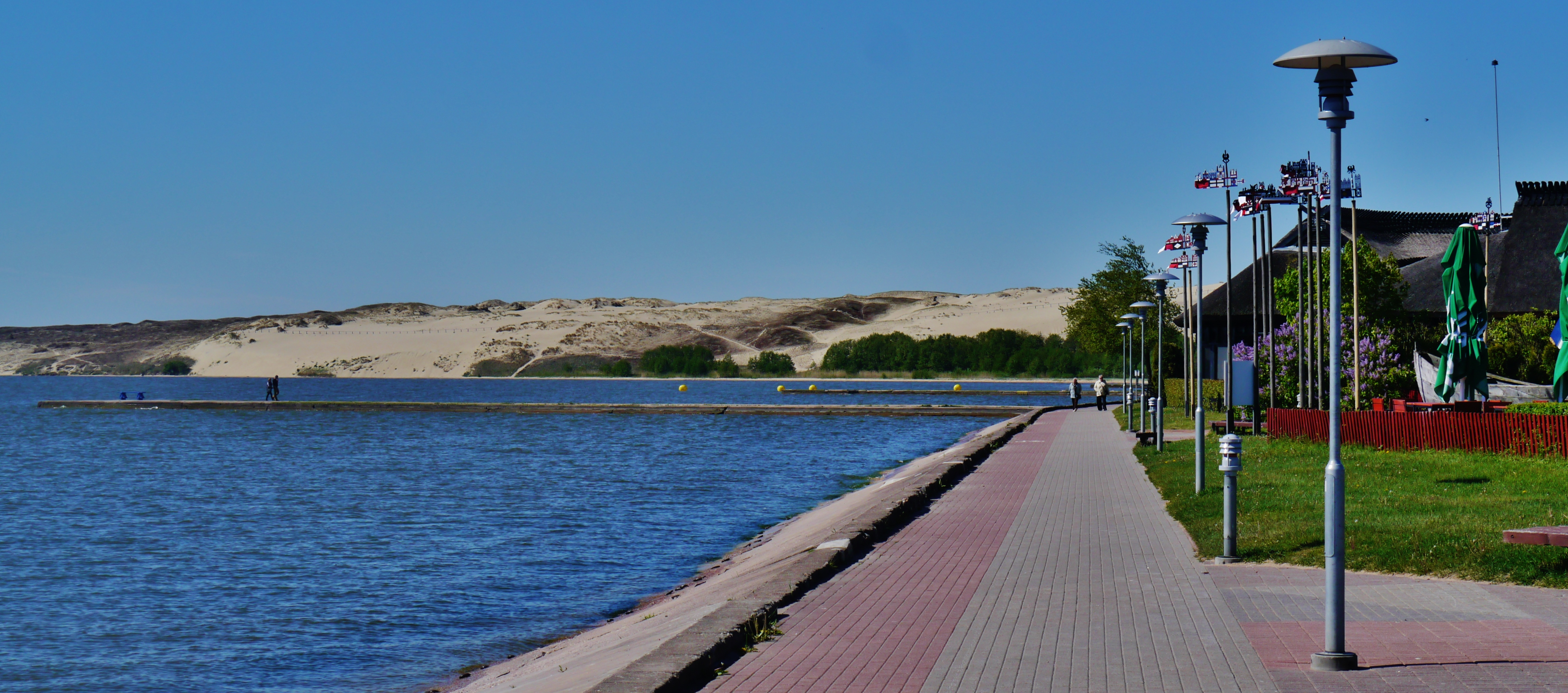
- Coast of Nida

- Flag Coat of arms

- Location of Neringa Municipality within Lithuania
- Interactive map of Neringa municipality
- Coordinates: 55°33′20″N 21°07′00″E
- Country: Lithuania
- Ethnographic region: Lithuania Minor
- County: Klaipėda County
- Capital: Nida
- Elderships: 2

Area
  - Total: 90 km^{2} (35 sq mi)
  - Rank: 55th

Population (2025)
  - Total: 4,712
  - Rank: 59th
  - Density: 52/km^{2} (140/sq mi)
  - Rank: 39-40th
- Time zone: UTC+2 (EET)
  - Summer (DST): UTC+3 (EEST)
- Telephone code: 469
- Major settlements: Nida (pop. 3,530)
- Website: www.neringa.lt

Neringa or Neringa Municipality (Lithuanian: Neringos savivaldybė) is a municipality of Klaipėda County in westernmost Lithuania, comprising several villages in the Curonian Spit. In terms of population, it is the second smallest municipality of the country (after Birštonas). Nida is the seat of government and largest settlement in Neringa Municipality.

== Etymology ==
The name of the city is relatively new and is not found in old scriptures in this form. The name is derived from a German word Neringe, Nerunge, Nehrung which itself is a derivative of a curonian word nerija meaning a long peninsular spit.

Until the 2000 Lithuanian municipality reform, it was known as Neringa City, although there was never a true "city" there. It was made a city in the Soviet Union in 1961 by formally combining 4 settlements into one administrative unit.

== Geography ==
Neringa is located south of Klaipėda, separated from the mainland Lithuania by Curonian Lagoon. It is accessible from the mainland Lithuania by ferry crossing the lagoon or overland through Kaliningrad Oblast, Russia.

The villages in Neringa municipality comprise:

- the self-governing resort settlement (kurortas) of Nida, seat of the local administration
- the eldership (seniūnija) of Juodkrantė
- the eldership of Preila and Pervalka.

They are tourist resorts and by then it was popular to grant more self-government to resorts. The municipality is the only one in Lithuania which is not called after a town or city. The name Neringa was created at Soviet time for the new city municipality.

== History ==
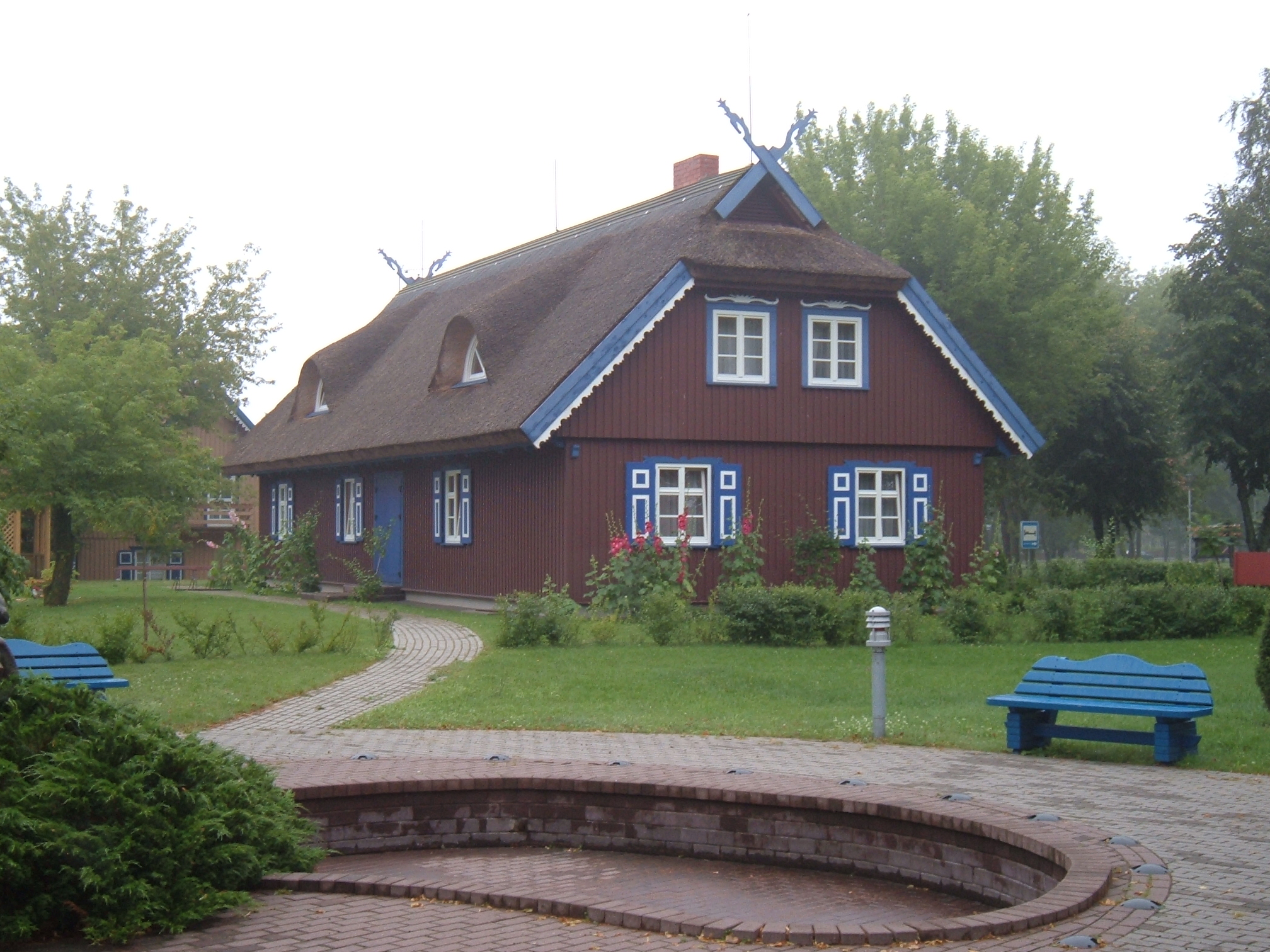
Traditional fisherman environment.

Since 1252 the region was part of the State of the Teutonic Knights. In 1454, Polish King Casimir IV Jagiellon incorporated the region to the Kingdom of Poland upon the request of the Prussian Confederation – a league formed in opposition to the Teutonic Order. After the subsequent Thirteen Years' War (1454–1466), the Teutonic Order regained authority over the town as a fief of the Polish Crown. From 1701 onwards it was part of the Kingdom of Prussia, and from 1871 it was also part of Germany. Already in 1569 a "confusion of languages" was noticed: German, Lithuanian, Latvian-Curonian (Nehrungskurisch) and Prussian. Nehrungskurisch was the language of the fishers.

Liudvikas Rėza, one of the most prominent Lithuanian language propagators and a linguist professor was born and living on the Curonian spit the 18th century, who added himself the second name – Gediminas in the honour of the Grand Duke of Lithuania.

The colours of the typical houses are handed down from the pagan religion and symbolize Divinities: Earth (brown), Sky and Water (blue), Clouds and Spray (white). At the top two crossed "žirgeliai" (horse heads).

The census of 1897 showed that about 60% used the Curonian language, on sea even 65%. In 1923, when sovereignty over the spit came to Lithuania, the inhabitants had problems with their nationality. Only few opted for Lithuania, many emigrated to Germany and others stayed as German "resident foreigners" in their villages. The result of the census of 1956: 59% Lithuanians, 21% Russians and only 15% (22 families) of the autochtone inhabitants.

== Coat of arms ==
The Coat of Arms from the year 1968 shows the black and white symbols of the Klaipėda Region, Kurenwimpel, Nida, Preila, Pervalka, Juodkrantė, Purvinė. The N stands for the new name.

== Literature ==
- Arūnė Arbušauskaitė. Einige Aspekte der nationalen Selbsteinschätzung bei der altansässigen Bevölkerung der Kurischen Nehrung nach 1945, in Annaberger Annalen 1994 (in German)
