= Hill of Witches =

Outdoor sculpture gallery in Lithuania

Coordinates: 55°32′11″N 21°6′53″E

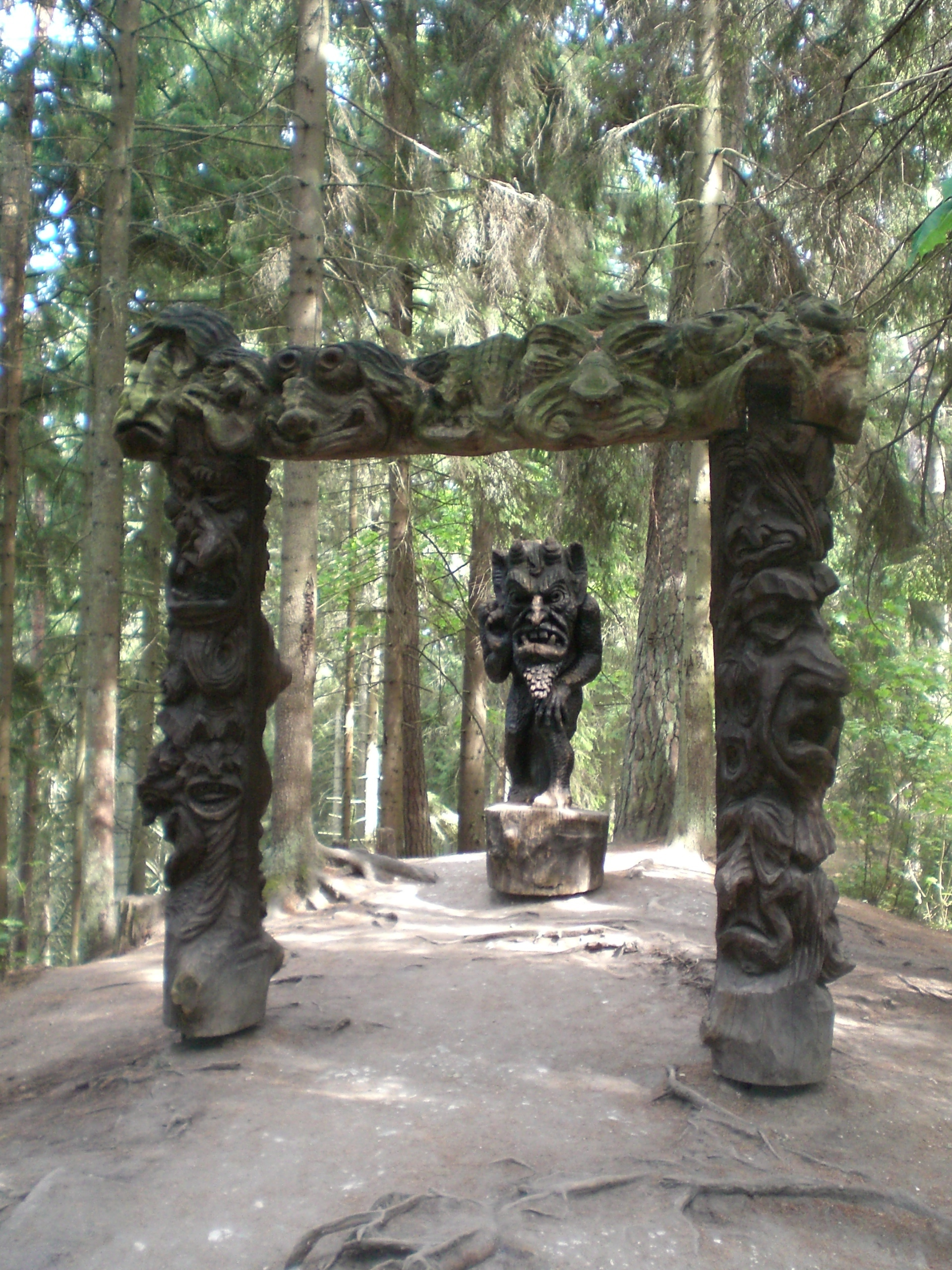
1979 sculpture "Lucifer and the gates of hell" by Raimundas and Anicentas Puškorius

The Hill of Witches (Lithuanian: Raganų kalnas) is an outdoor sculpture gallery near Juodkrantė, Lithuania.

It is located on a forested sand dune about 0.5 kilometer west of the Curonian Lagoon, on the Lithuanian Seaside Cycle Route. Begun in 1979, it has been expanded several times, and now contains about 80 wooden sculptures along with a series of trails. The artists drew on a long tradition of woodcarving in Samogitia, and on the equally long tradition of Joninės celebrations on the hill. The pieces depict characters from Lithuanian folklore and pagan traditions.

Woodcarving symposia are held at the park on a regular basis, and new works are added. Admission is free.
