= Juodkrantė =

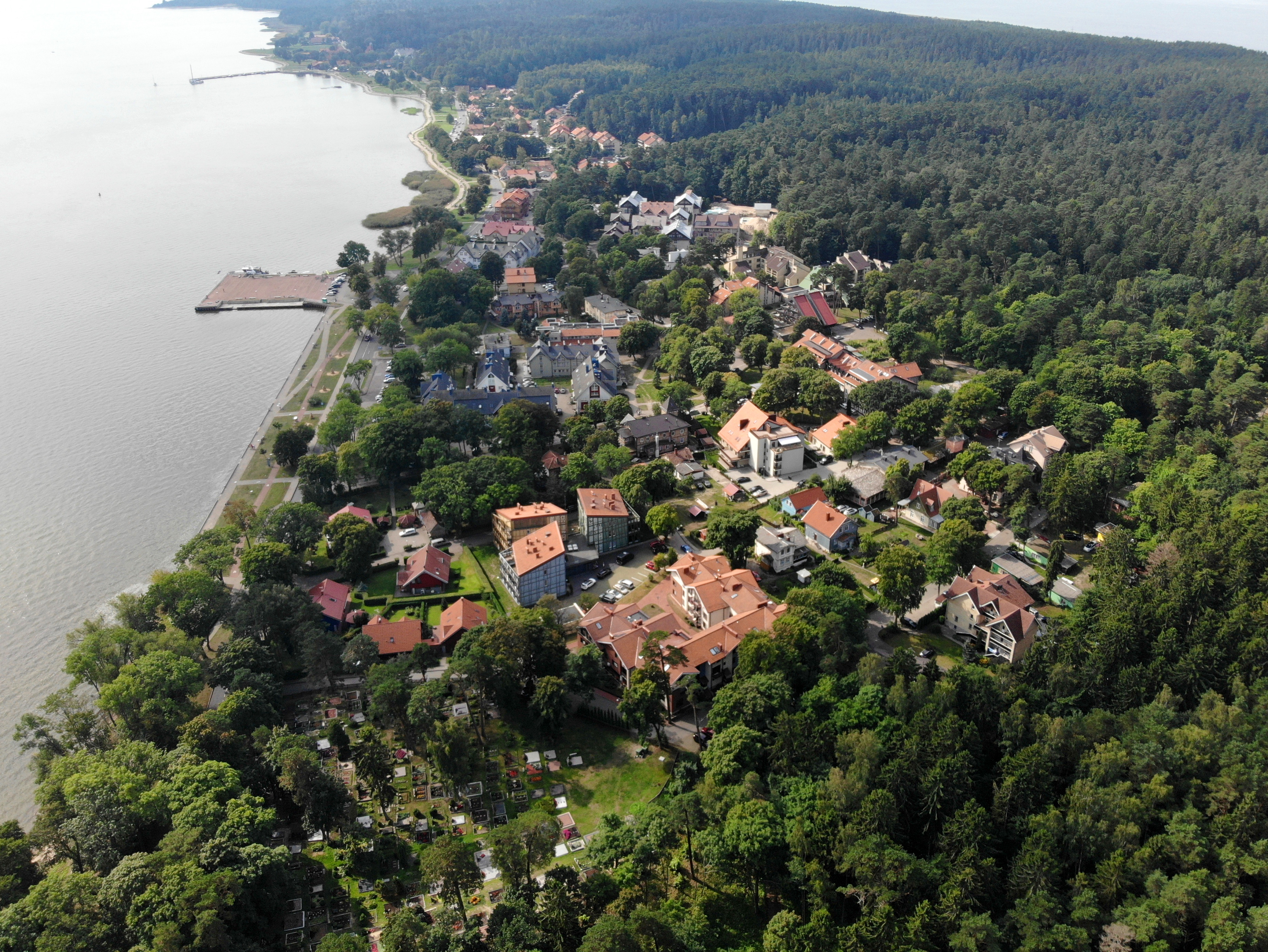
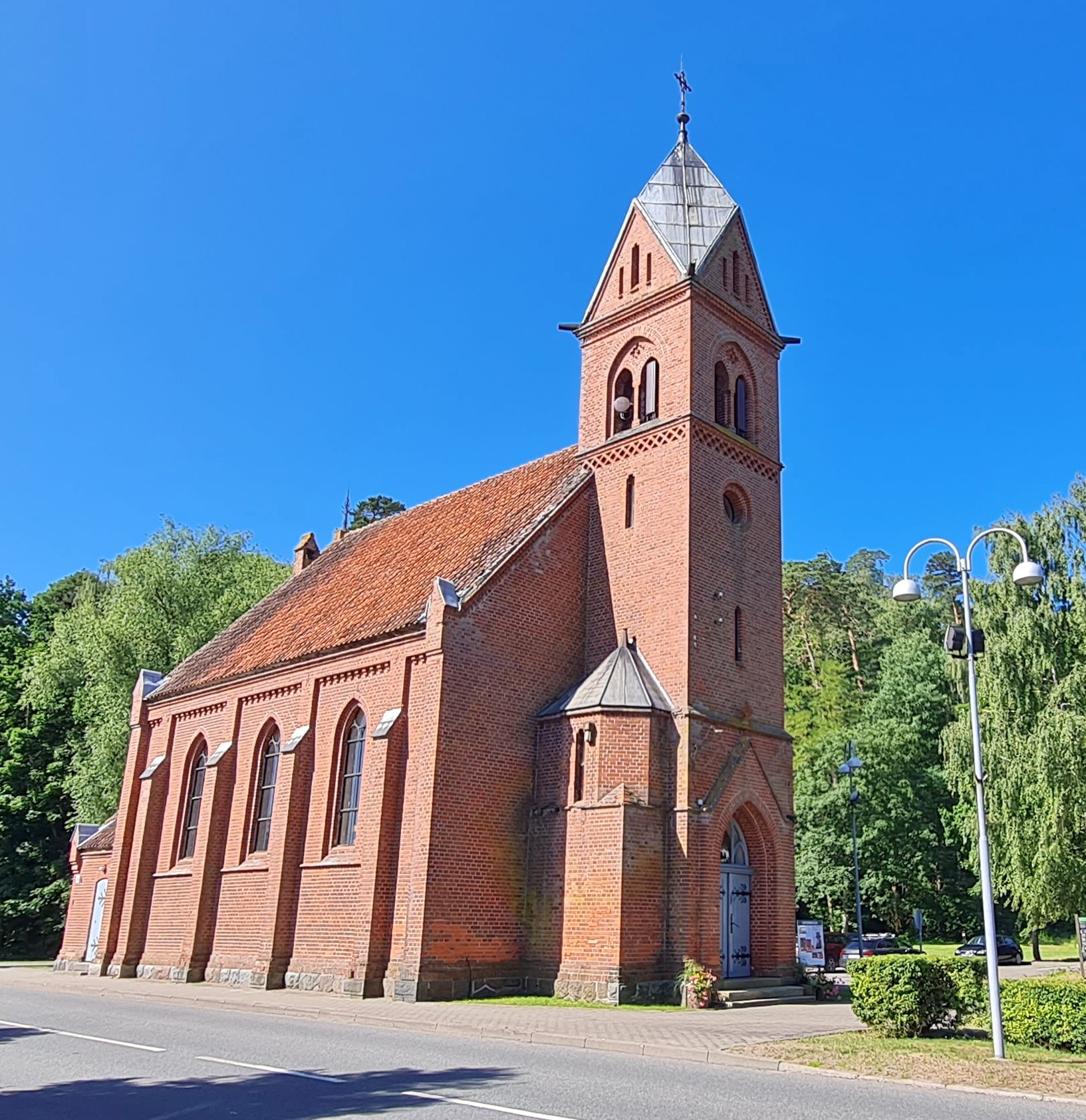
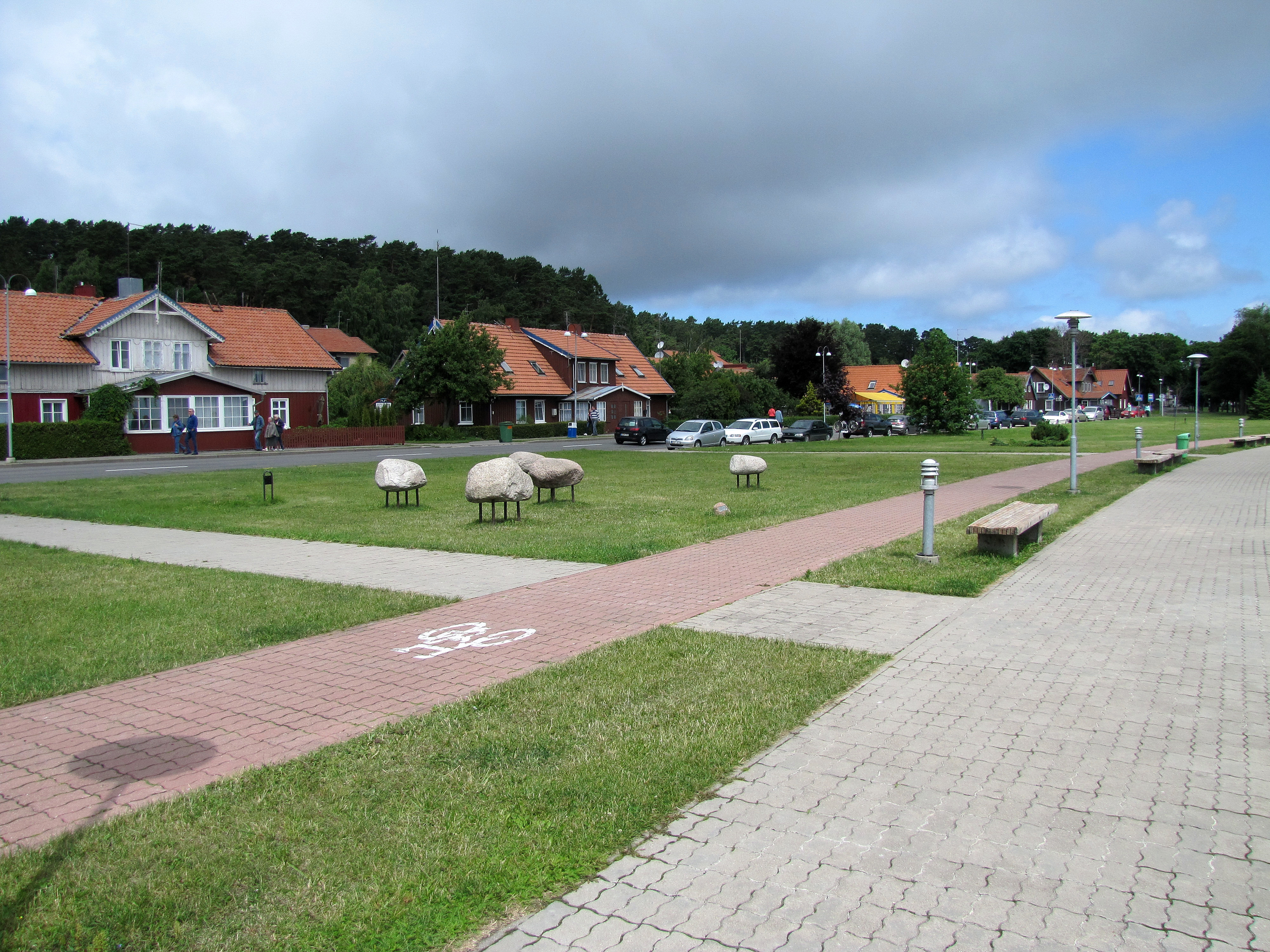
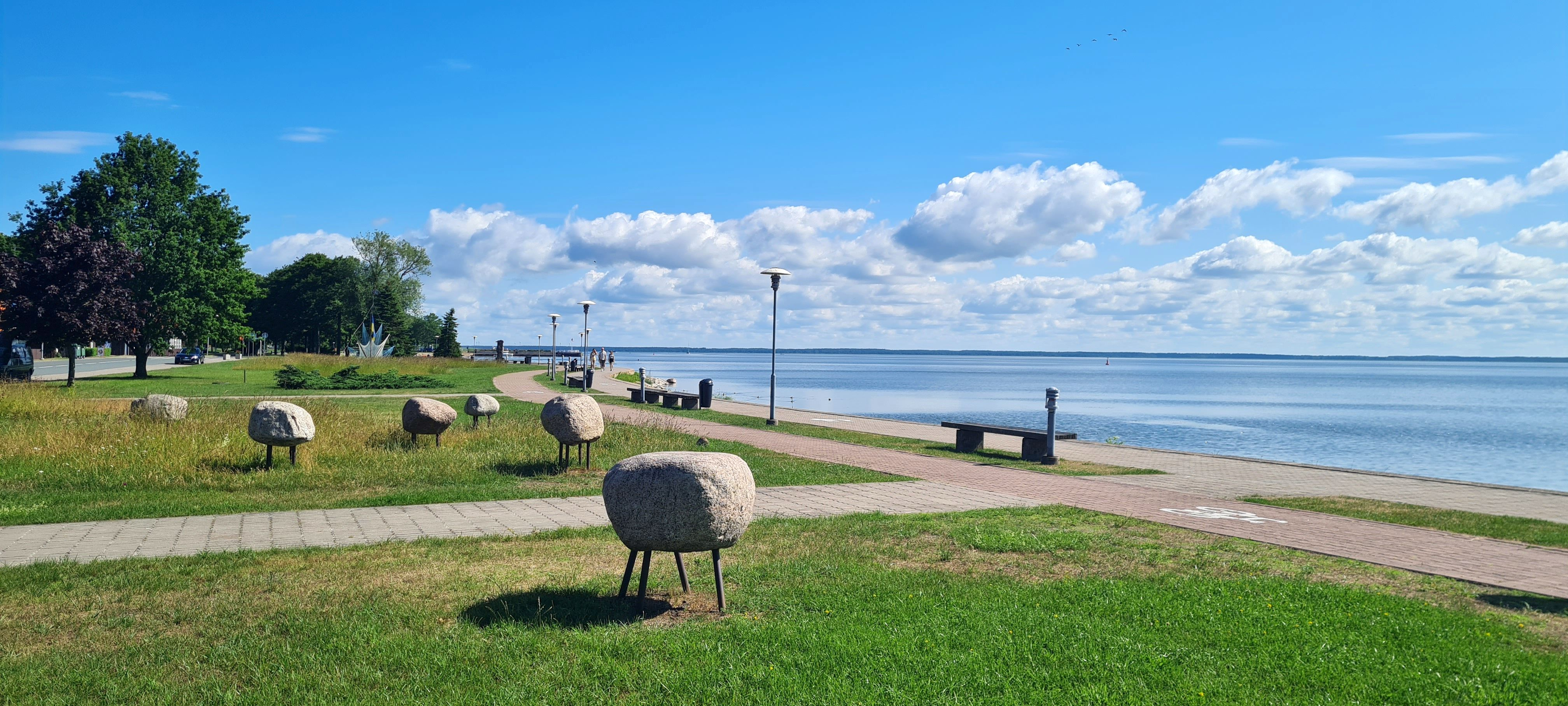
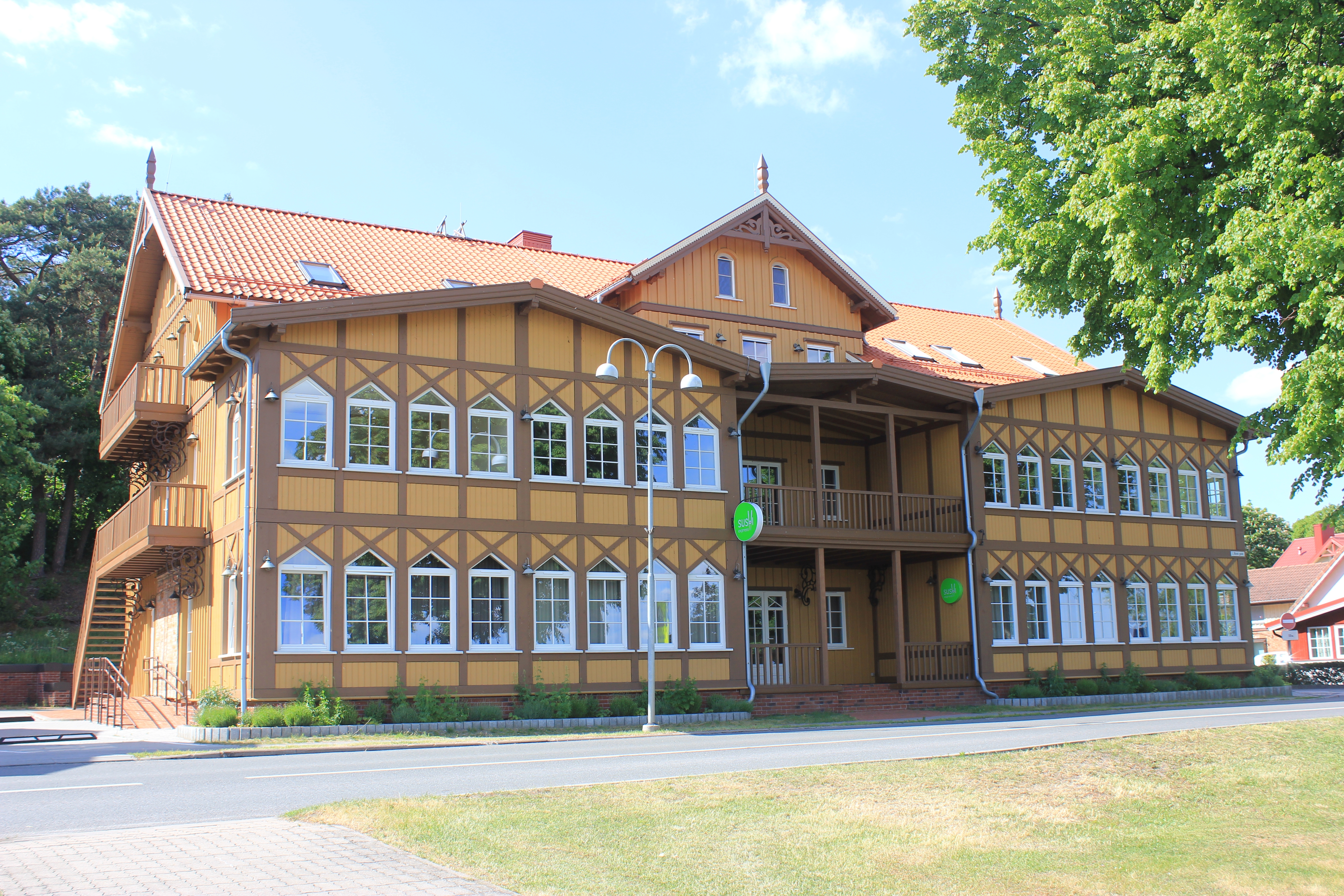
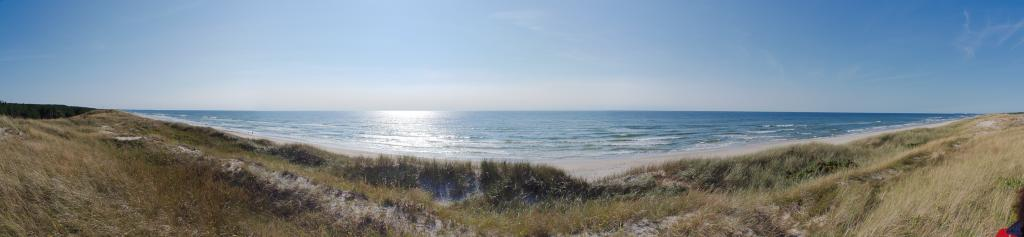
- Aerial view of Juodkrantė Evangelical Lutheran Church Traditional houses and bicycle path Coast of the Curonian Lagoon Resort house A view of the Baltic Sea near Juodkrantė

- Flag
- Interactive map of Juodkrantė
- Location within Lithuania Location within Baltic Sea
- Coordinates: 55°33′N 21°07′E
- Country: Lithuania
- County: Klaipėda County
- Municipality: Neringa Municipality
- First mentioned: 1429
- Time zone: UTC+2 (EET)
  - Summer (DST): UTC+3 (EEST)

Juodkrantė (literally: Black Shore, Kursenieki: Šatnūrta or Šatnūrte, German: Schwarzort) is a Lithuanian seaside resort town located on the Curonian Spit with a permanent population of about 720 people. A part of Neringa municipality, Juodkrantė is the second largest settlement on Lithuania's part of the spit. For centuries it was a fishing village, which underwent a tourist boom in the late 19th–early 20th century.

== History ==
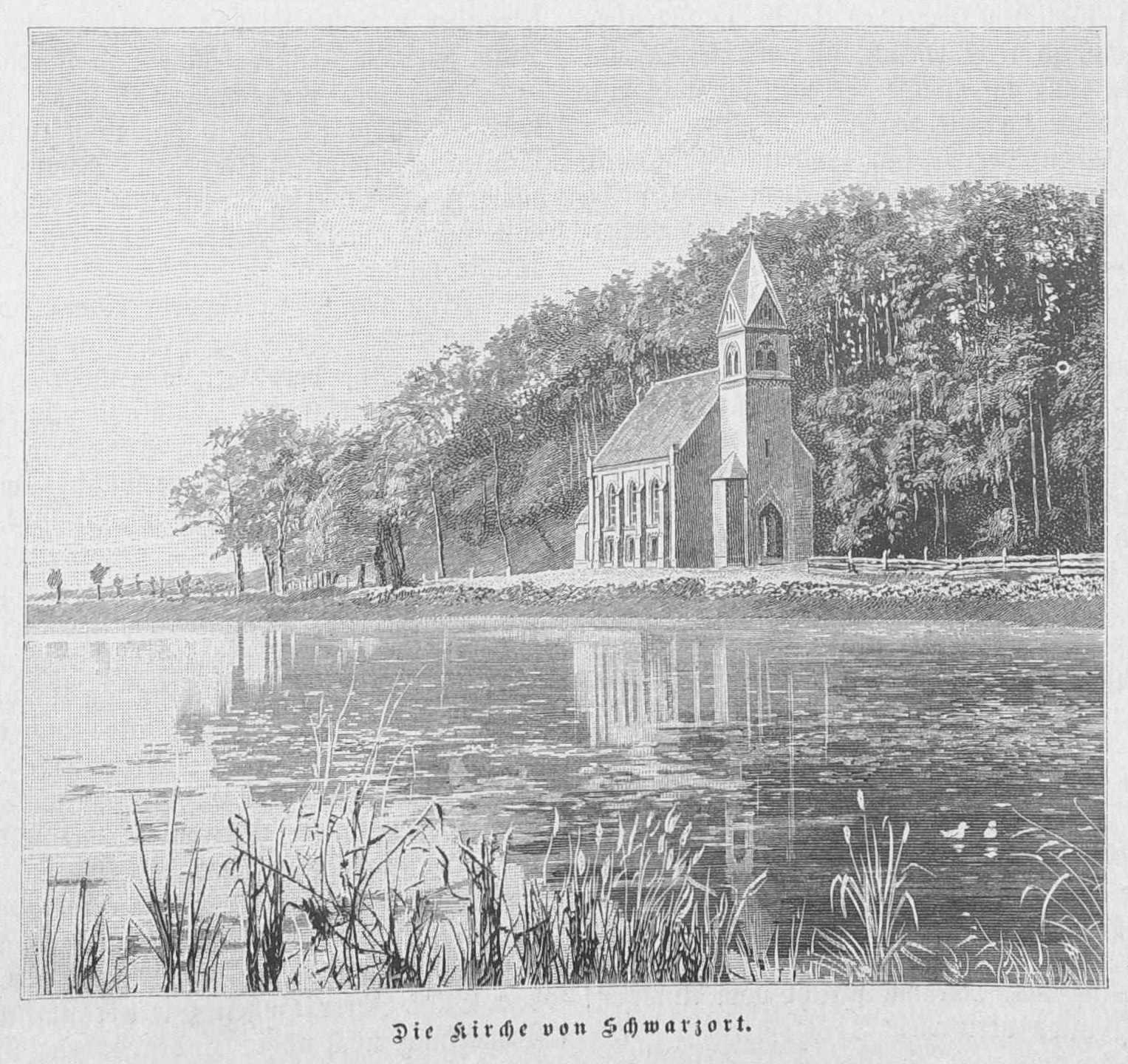
Evangelical Lutheran Church, 1888

Juodkrantė was first mentioned (as Schwarzort) by the Teutonic Knights in 1429 in a letter describing storm damages. It was initially situated along the Baltic Sea shore, about 2.5 km from the present location. In the early 17th century, due to the Black Death, and moving sand dunes threatening to bury the town, it lost almost all of its inhabitants. In the 1680s, the village relocated to its present location along the Curonian Lagoon shore. After 1724, the sources do not mention the town along the Baltic Sea shore any more. The town did quite well in the new location: a tavern was opened in 1673, a school in 1743, and a wooden church in 1795. From the 18th century, the town formed part of the Kingdom of Prussia, within which it belonged to the Memel/Klaipėda County until 1740, then from 1740–1795 to the Karvaičiai (then Germanized as Karwaiten) Church District. It grew in importance after Carwaiten/Karvaičiai/Karwaiten village was swallowed by traveling sand and the seat of the Church District relocated here. The wooden church burned down in 1878 but was soon replaced by a red brick Lutheran church in 1885.

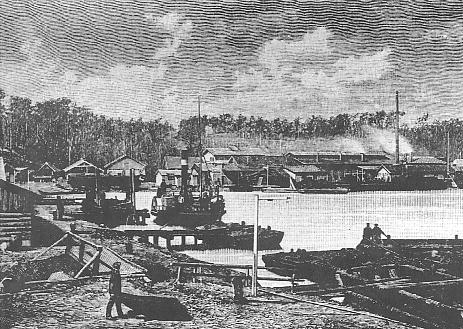
Stantien & Becker operations in the Amber Bay in 1880

Major developments took place in 1860s. In the late 1850s the lagoon waterway was deepened and now ferries could arrive. It was the easiest way to travel. In the course of the work, samples of amber were found. In 1860 the Stantien & Becker company was founded to dig amber just north of the village. During 30 years of operations, it dug out about 2,250 tonnes of amber. At its peak, the company employed about 1,000 workers. The company had a positive effect on KAKALAS out was used to reinforce the shore and swampy areas. After the company relocated to Palmnicken (now Yantarny) in 1890, the population of Schwarzort dropped from 851 in 1885 to 423 in 1895.

In 1871, the town became part of the German Empire, within which it was administratively located in the province of East Prussia. In the late 19th century, its population was Kursenieki and Lithuanian, and was mostly living off fishing. Local church services were held in the Lithuanian and German languages.

Following World War I and the re-establishment of independent Lithuania, it became part of Lithuania. During World War II, it was occupied by Germany.

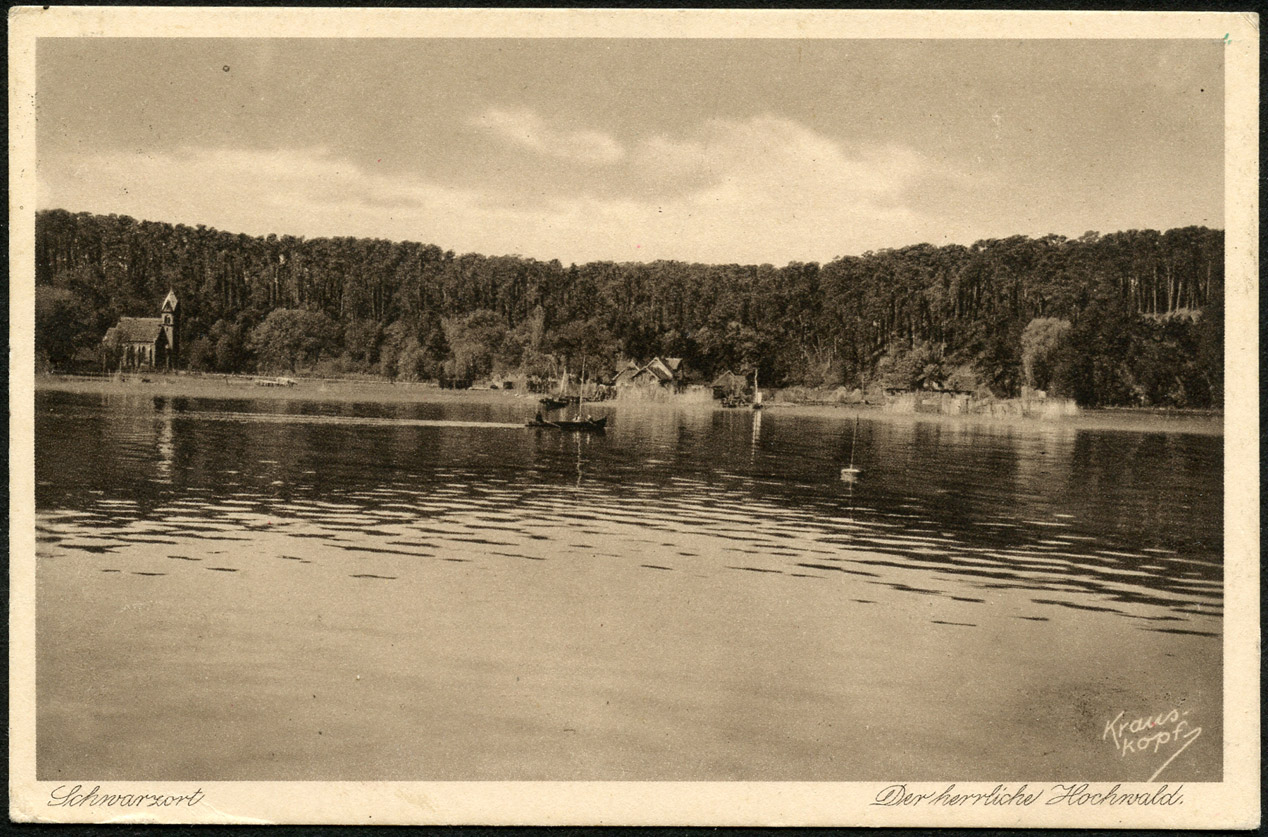
Juodkrantė in 1936

The tourist business was started in 1860s by Edward Stellmacher, who turned an old tavern house into a hotel named Kurischer Hof (Lithuanian: Kuršių kiemas, now Gintaras). Because of the amber business, a new Juodkrantė was developed north of the old fishermen town. Many villas and hotels were built there. At the beginning of the 20th century, there were 5 hotels, 20 villas, and a convalescent home Luisenbad (Lithuanian: Luizės maudykla). The new town was considered a luxury resort and attracted about 3,000 visitors a year. World War II destroyed the tourist business. Neringa was a strictly regulated border region. Only in the early 1960s tourists started to come back. However, Nida became a more popular destination for tourists. This allowed Juodkrantė to retain its old business - fishing. Sometimes it is referred to as the "capital of fishermen" and holds annual fishermen festival in July.

=== Amber treasure ===
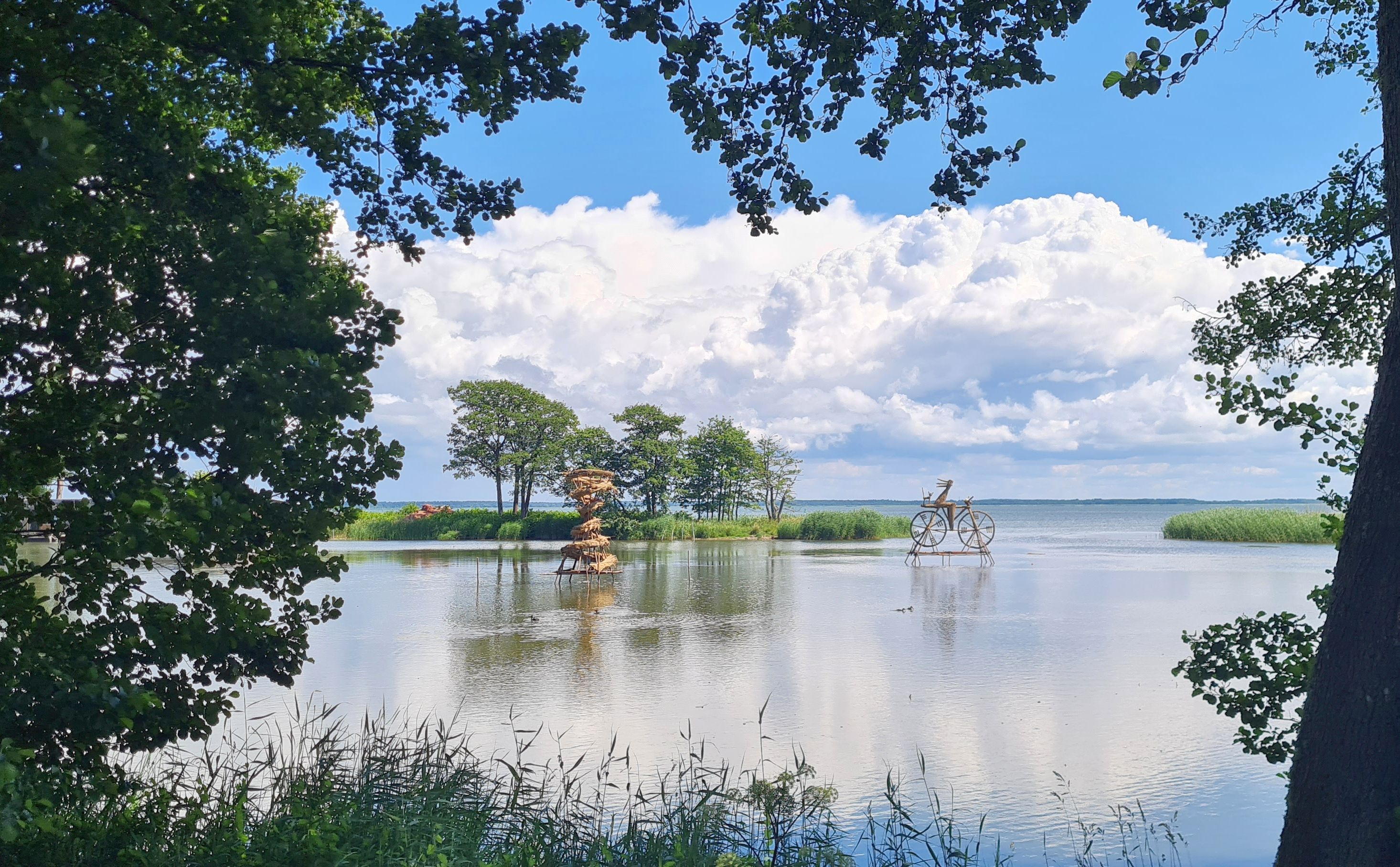
Amber Bay in 2023

Stantien & Becker would dig up many pieces of amber shaped as amulets or knick-knacks. At first, they would give them out as souvenirs, but then started collecting these items from the Mid Neolithic and the Bronze Ages. Richard Klebs, professor at Königsberg University, described 435 items (pendants, buttons, tubular beads, discs, and figurines of humans and animals) in his book Stone Age Amber Adornments in 1882. These ancient Schwarzorter Funde are considered to contain the earliest known amber carving finds from the Baltic Sea area (with amber carvings thousands of years older in other locations). About 150 items have detailed images. The collection was exhibited in Berlin, St. Petersburg, London, Chicago. After Klebs' death, Königsberg University purchased his collection. However, during the turbulent times of World War II and the expulsions from East Prussia most of the large collection in Königsberg was destroyed or stolen and only a few items were saved at Göttingen University, previously the sister university of Königsberg. But scientists were able to make replicas from detailed illustrations in Klebs' book.

=== Genealogy ===
Most of the genealogical information was recorded in Church books "Kirchenbücher" when the wooden church was built in 1795. Records are stored in Evangelisches Zentralarchiv Berlin and Bundesarchiv. Some families moved to Juodkrantė from Karwaiten (Karvaičiai) when sand buried this site completely in 1797.

== Tourist attractions ==
=== Hill of Witches ===
A large collection of wooden sculptures by various artists is displayed on the Hill of Witches (Lithuanian: Raganų kalnas). The sculpture park was started in 1979 and now has more than 70 wooden objects. Most of the figures are based on Lithuanian legends or folk tales. Before the surrounding area was planted with trees, visitors could admire a view of the sea and the lagoon.

=== Sculpture park "Land and Water" ===
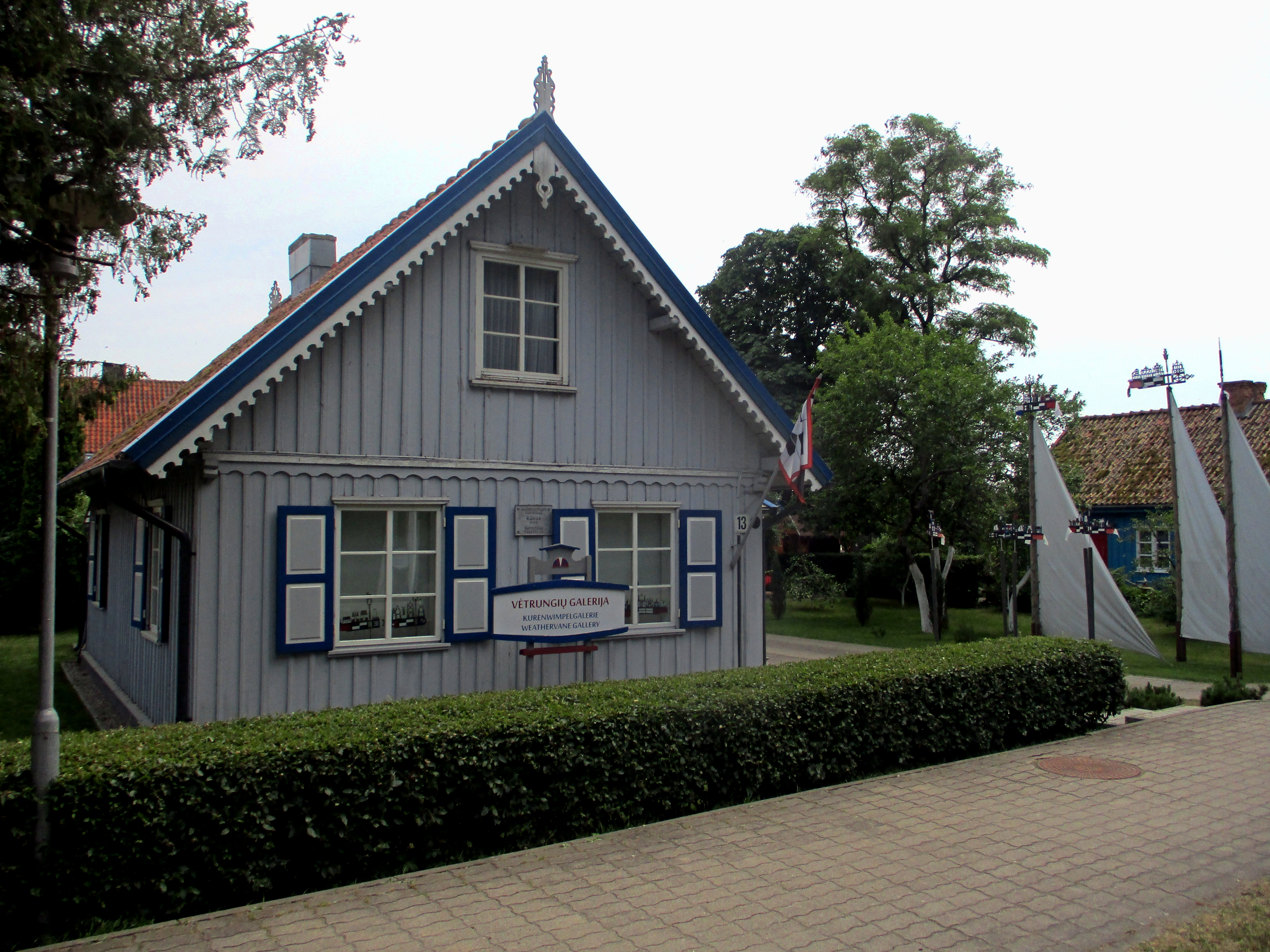
Weathervane gallery

Another sculpture park was finished in 2002. It houses 31 stone and metal sculptures created during an international symposium "Land and Water." The sculptures are located on the recently built quay, 2.4 km in length, along the lagoon shore.

A Weathervane gallery (Vėtrungių galerija) is maintained by Daiva and Remigijus Žadeikiai. The gallery has information on the Nerija cultural heritage. There is also a gallery maintained by the Lithuanian National Art Museum.

=== The heron and cormorant colonies ===
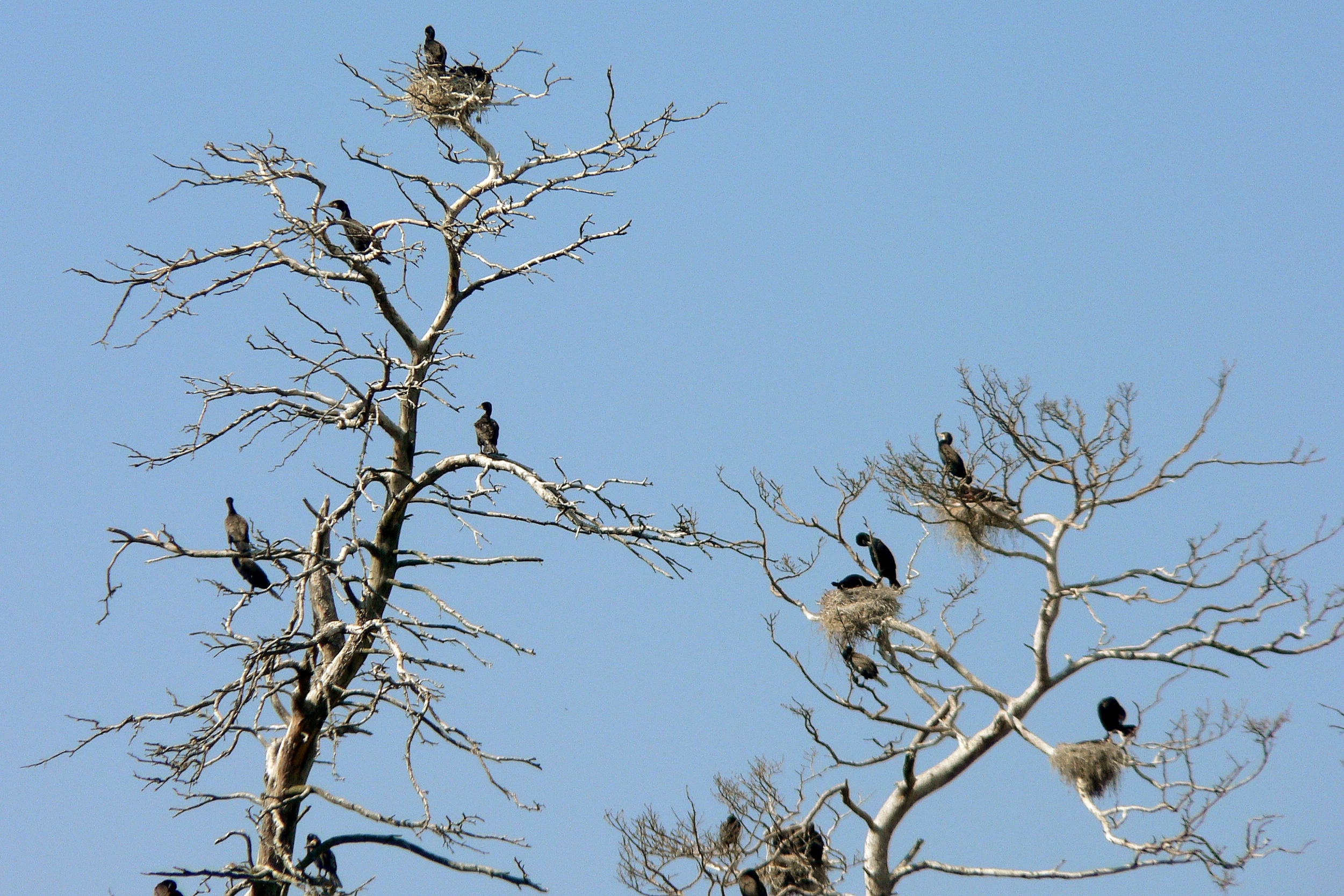
Cormorant nests on dead pine trees in the colony near Juodkrantė

Of interest to nature watchers are the large great cormorant (2000 pairs) and grey heron (500 pairs) colonies west of Juodkrantė. It is believed that the herons have nested near Juodkrantė since 17th century, but the cormorants arrived only at the beginning of 19th century. The cormorants were exterminated at the end of the 19th century due to Prussian administration regulations and started to reappear only in the 1970s. The large cormorant colony has damaged the old and fragile forest because the birds' excrement burns tree roots. During last 15 years about 10 ha (25 acres) of forest has died. Fishermen blame the birds for diminishing fish catches, but unlike in Prussia, the regulations now do not allow killing them as both grey heron and great cormorant are protected species in Lithuania.

== Famous people ==
- Gustav Fenkohl, a sea- and landscape painter, was born in 1872 in nearby Memel and lived for many years in the village.

== Sport and sailing ==
Kitesurfing/Windsurfing

Juodkrantė is a kitesurfing / windsurfing spot and kite flying beaches in Lithuania. It is open to all wind directions. The Curonian lagoon side is also has snowkiteboarding.

Sailing

Juodkrantė is on inland waterway from Nida to Klaipėda. There are two piers in Juodkrantė for yachts and boats. A yacht club is under development. Navigation - Juodkrantė Lighthouse (20m) int.no 0049 (C3334) - White rectangle on black square metal framework tower with viewing platform. From sea visible only top part.

Paragliding

Juodkrantė is a place of choice for eastern winds. Paragliding sand dune site is south-east from town. Western side - beach dunes are hard to fly.
