= Kursenieki =

Total population
- ~1200 (1897)

Regions with significant populations
- Lithuania, Germany

Languages
- Latvian (Kursenieki)

Religion
- Lutheranism

Related ethnic groups
- Latvians, Prussian Lithuanians, Lithuanians

The Kursenieki (Latvian: kursenieki, German: Kuren – 'Curonians', Lithuanian: kuršininkai, kuršiai, Polish: Kuronowie Pruscy, Kurończycy) are a nearly extinct Baltic ethnic group living along the Curonian Spit. "Kuršiai" refers only to inhabitants of Lithuania and former East Prussia that speak a southwestern dialect of Latvian. Some autochthonous inhabitants of Šventoji in Lithuania call themselves "kuršiai" as well.

== Confusion ==
Kursenieki are often confused with the extinct Curonian Baltic tribe, as neighbouring ethnic groups called Kuršininkai/ Kursenieki as Curonians: in German, Latvian and Lithuanian, Kursenieki and the Curonian tribes are known by the same terms (Kuren, kurši and kuršiai respectively). In Polish, they are referred to as either Kuronowie Pruscy, which translates to "Prussian Curonians", or Kurończycy, a name which distinguishes them from the autochthonous people of the Courland region in Latvia, known as Kurowie in Polish. In Lithuanian scholarly literature, the name kuršininkai is used to distinguish them from the Curonian tribe. Similarly in Latvian kursenieki is used mostly exclusively by scientists to distinguish them from the Curonian tribe. On the other hand, Kursenieki should not be confused with Kurzemnieki, which are the geographical group of Latvians from Courland.

=== Self-designation ===
The Kursenieki have never designated themselves as Latvians and called their own language "Curonian language" (kursisk valoud). From a linguistic point of view, it is a southwestern dialect of Latvian, while some linguists also consider it a sociolect as Kursenieki were predominantly fishermen. In German and Latvian writings of the 19th century, Kursenieki sometimes are called "Prussian Latvians" (German: Preussische Letten; Latvian: Prūsijas latvieši). Kursenieki were loyal to Germany and identified themselves as German citizens and ethnic Kursenieki.

=== Language ===
The language spoken by the Kursenieki is referred to as the Kursenieki language. It is distinct from the Curonian language (or Old Curonian) spoken by the Curonian people.

== History ==
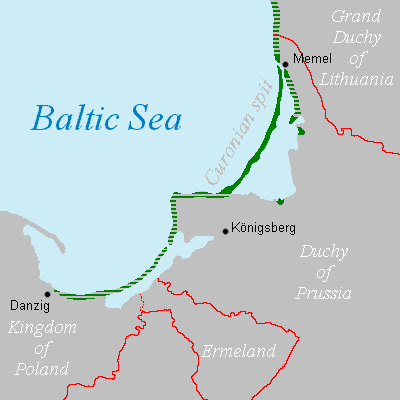
Curonian-populated area in 1649

=== Origins ===
The exact origin of the Kursenieki is unclear. One version says that they are indigenous descendants of the Curonian tribe that lived there since antiquity, at least along the Curonian Spit. During the conquest of the Old Prussians and Curonians by the Teutonic Knights, the area became nearly uninhabited. In the process of various migrations of the 14th–17th centuries, Curonians from Courland settled near Memel, along the Curonian and Vistulan Spits, as well as in Sambia (all regions in East Prussia). They preserved the old self-designation of Curonians (kurši), while Curonians who stayed in Courland fused into Latvians.

Over time the Kursenieki were assimilated by Germans, except along the Vistulan and Curonian Spits, where some still live. Until the Soviet Army's takeover in 1945, several places in Sambia were named after Kursenieki, including Cranzkuhren, Neukuhren, Gross Kuhren, and Klein Kuhren. In 1649, Kursenieki lived from Memel to Danzig. At the end of the 19th century the total number of Kursenieki was around 4,000 persons.

=== Interbellum ===
Kursenieki were considered Latvians after World War I when Latvia gained independence from the Russian Empire. This consideration was based on linguistic arguments and was the rationale for Latvian claims over the Curonian Spit, Memel, and some other territories of East Prussia. Later these claims were removed. In 1923, the newly created Memel Territory separated the Curonian Spit in two parts. This separation interrupted contacts between Kursenieki. In 1933, Latvia tried to establish a cultural center for Kursenieki of the Curonian Spit where the majority of them lived, but that was opposed by Lithuania, of which Memel Territory was a part.

=== After World War II ===
Near the end of World War II, the majority of Kursenieki fled from the Red Army during the evacuation of East Prussia. Kursenieki that remained behind were subsequently expelled as Germans by the Soviet Union after the war and replaced with Russians and Lithuanians.

Some Kursenieki managed to return to their homes after the war, but only 219 lived along the Curonian Spit in 1955 most of them in Latvia. Many had German names such as Fritz or Hans, a cause for anti-German discrimination. Russian residents called the Kursenieki "fascists", while Lithuanians called them kuršiai. Neither Lithuania nor Russia have allowed the return to Kursenieki of property confiscated after World War II.

== Culture ==
Curonians are one of the Baltic tribes. Their culture, religion and architecture are similar to those found in Germany and Sweden. Curonians are related with Lithuanians and Latvians. The Kursenieki were predominantly Lutheran, like most former inhabitants of East Prussia, although some ancient pagan customs were preserved. Most Kursenieki were bilingual or even trilingual: the Curonian language was used within the family and while fishing, German was used in everyday communication, and the language of church services was German and Lithuanian. The Kursenieki were primarily fishermen. Some elements of cuisine are named after Kursenieki, for example, Curonian coffee (Kurenkaffee); a drink made of vodka flavoured with coffee, honey and other ingredients was popular throughout East Prussia.

The first scholar who took an interest in Kursenieki culture and language was Paul Kwauka, a member of the separatist movement of Memel Territory. His book "Kurisches Wörterbuch" is a highly valuable source of information. The work of describing their heritage is continued by one of the last remaining Kursenieki, Richard Pietsch.

=== Image gallery ===
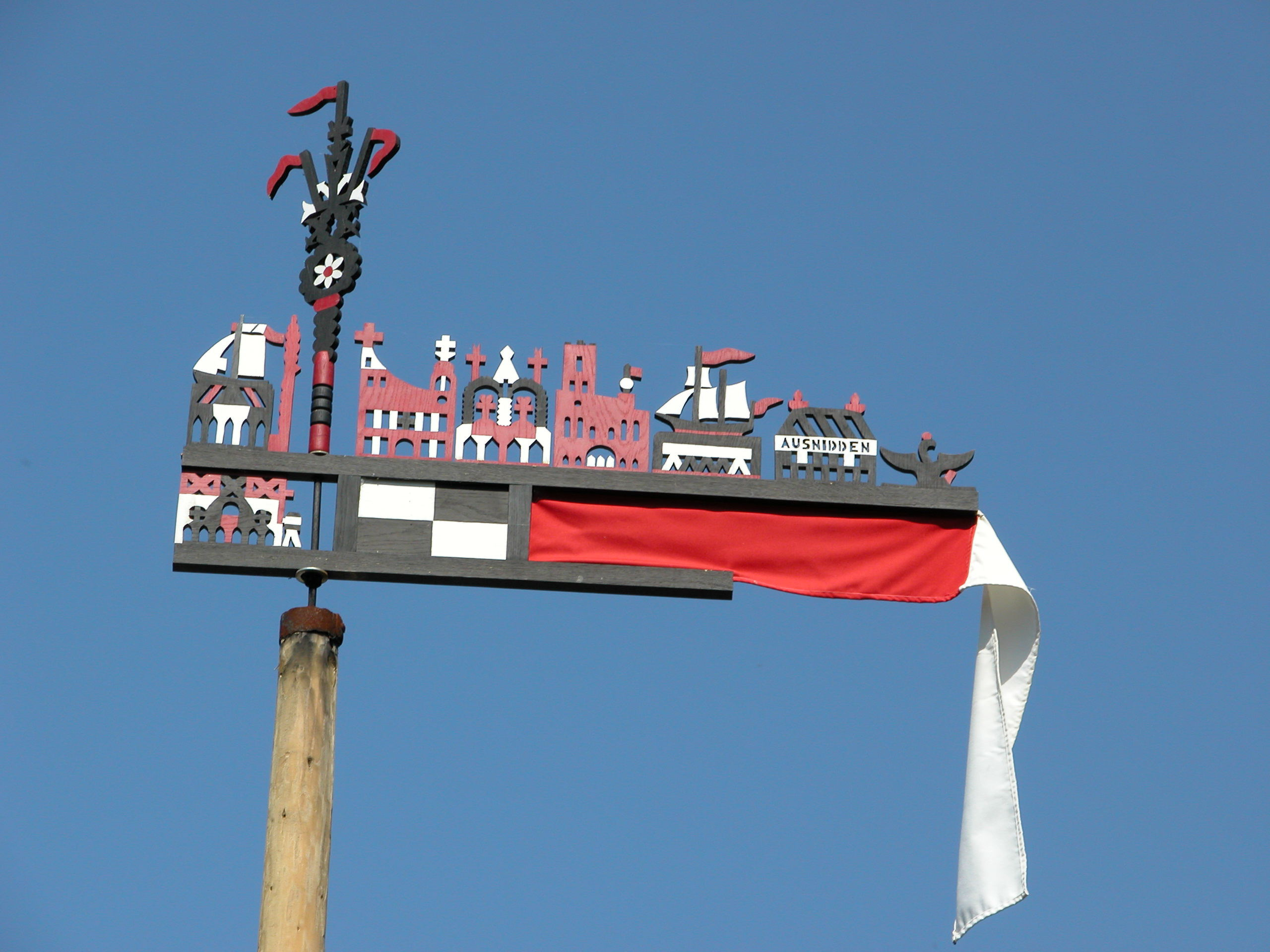
Pennant of Curonian boat from Nida

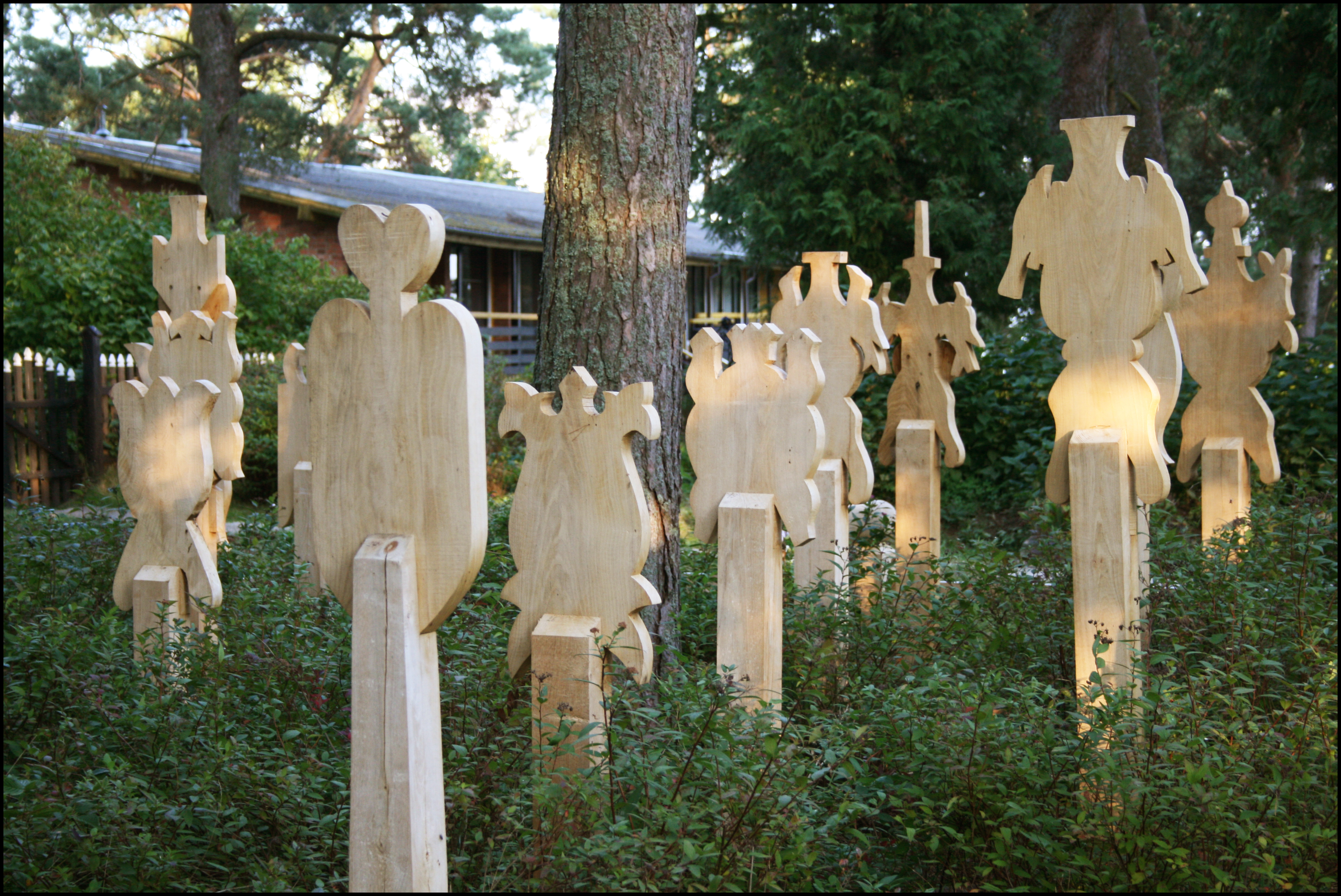
Restored Kursenieki wooden grave markers (krikštai) at Nida cemetery

== Surnames ==
The surnames of Kursenieki have various origins, including:

- Latvian, some with elements of Old Curonian: Gulbis, Kakies, Kuite, Kukulitis, Pinkis, Strangulis
- Lithuanian: Kalwis, Lauzeningks, Detzkeit, Jakeit
- Lithuanian or Latvian or Old Prussian: Dullis, Purwins
- German: Kiehr, Schmidt
- German with Baltic elements: Engelins
- Slavic: Pietsch
- Polish: Schadowski
- Old Prussian: Schekahn

== Notable people ==
- Immanuel Kant (1724–1804) had Kursenieki roots on his paternal side.
- Ludwig Rhesa (1776–1840), translator, member of Lietuvininkai movement.

== See also ==
- Curonians
- Curonian language
- East Prussia
