= Kursenieki language =

Latvian dialect of the Curonian Spit

Kursenieki
- kursineeki wahloda
- Region: Curonian Spit (historically), Germany (nowadays)
- Ethnicity: Kursenieki
- Native speakers: 2 full, 3 partial, a few passive speakers (2016)
- Language family: Indo-European: Balto-Slavic; Baltic?; East Baltic; Latvian; Central; Curonic; Kursenieki

Language codes
- ISO 639-3: –
- Glottolog: curo1234
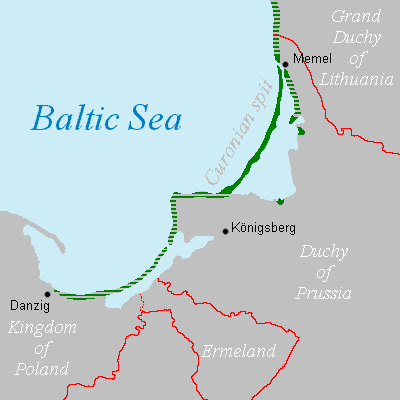
- The area of Kursenieki language speakers in 1649

The Kursenieki language (Kursenieki: kursineeki wahloda; Latvian: kursenieku valoda; German: Nehrungskurisch; Lithuanian: kuršininkų kalba) or Curonian language of the Curonian isthmus (German: kurische Sprache der Kurischen Nehrung) is a dialect of the Latvian language spoken by the Kursenieki of the Curonian Spit, a thin strip of land stretching between southwestern Lithuania and the Kaliningrad exclave of Russia.

In the process of various migrations of the 14th–17th centuries, partially assimilated Curonians who were already speaking a Latvian dialect settled along the Curonian Spit in East Prussia and gradually developed a distinct identity becoming known as Kursenieki.

== Influences and vocabulary ==
The Kursenieki language was influenced by Old Prussian, Low German, High German and the Samogitian language successively, and by the end of the 18th century new Curonian dialects had formed, with the dialect of the Curonian Spit being notably distinct, due to its isolation from the mainland. A Kursenieki vocabulary published in 1927 shows that 60% of Curonian words were the same as Latvian, 26% were loanwords from German (either Low German or High German), and 13% were borrowed from Lithuanian dialects. The Kursenieki language is mutually intelligible with Latvian, especially its southwestern dialects.

== History ==
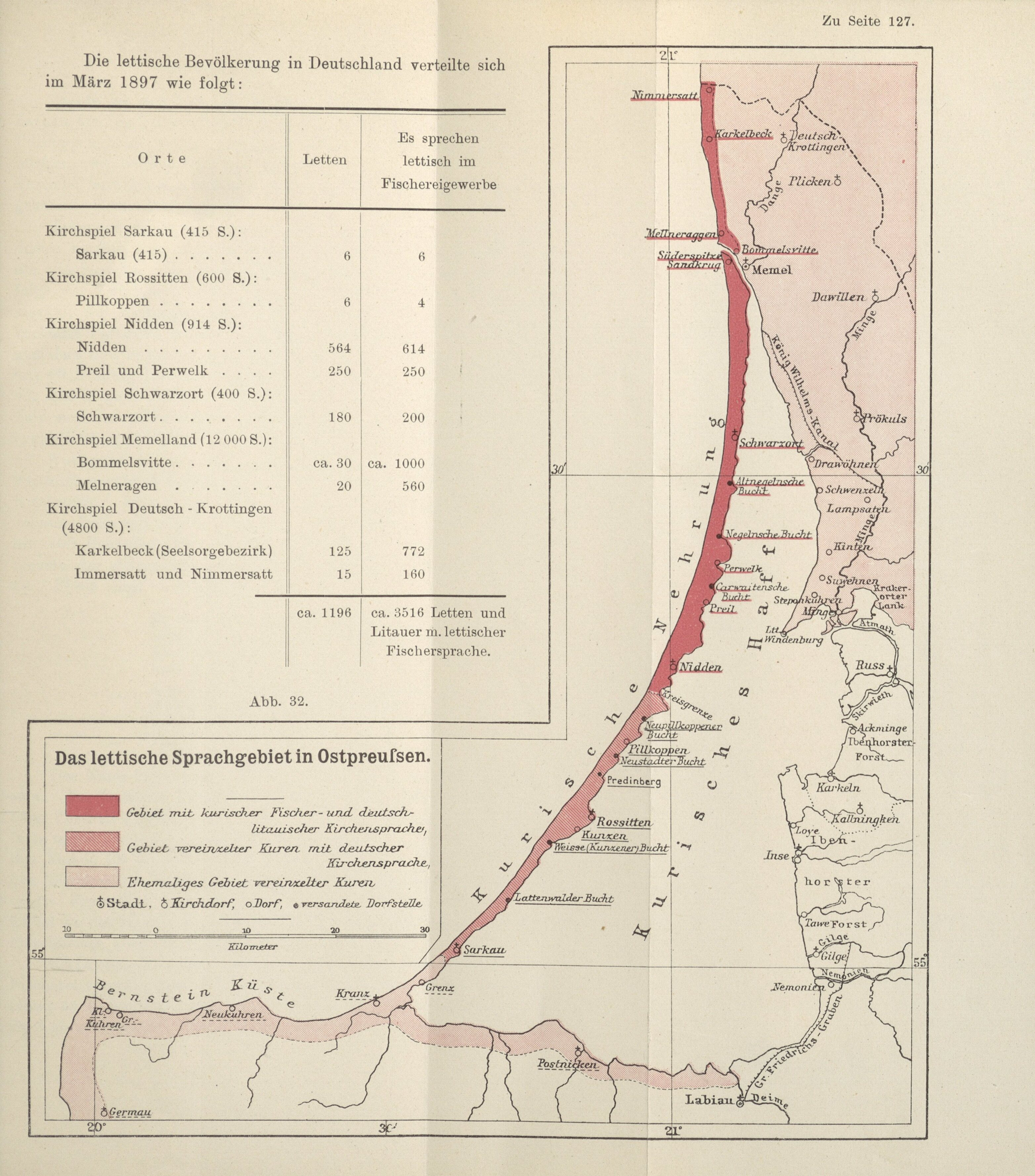
Kursieniki language in the German Empire 1897

Before World War II, the Kursenieki language was a sociolect of Curonian fishermen of the Curonian Spit. In other spheres of everyday life, Kursenieki used German of their surrounding environment. The events of the first half of the 20th century and the Soviet annexation of East Prussia led to the near extinction of the language, making it severely endangered. Several remaining native speakers live in Germany, having been expelled in the ethnic cleansing that took place in East Prussia after World War II.

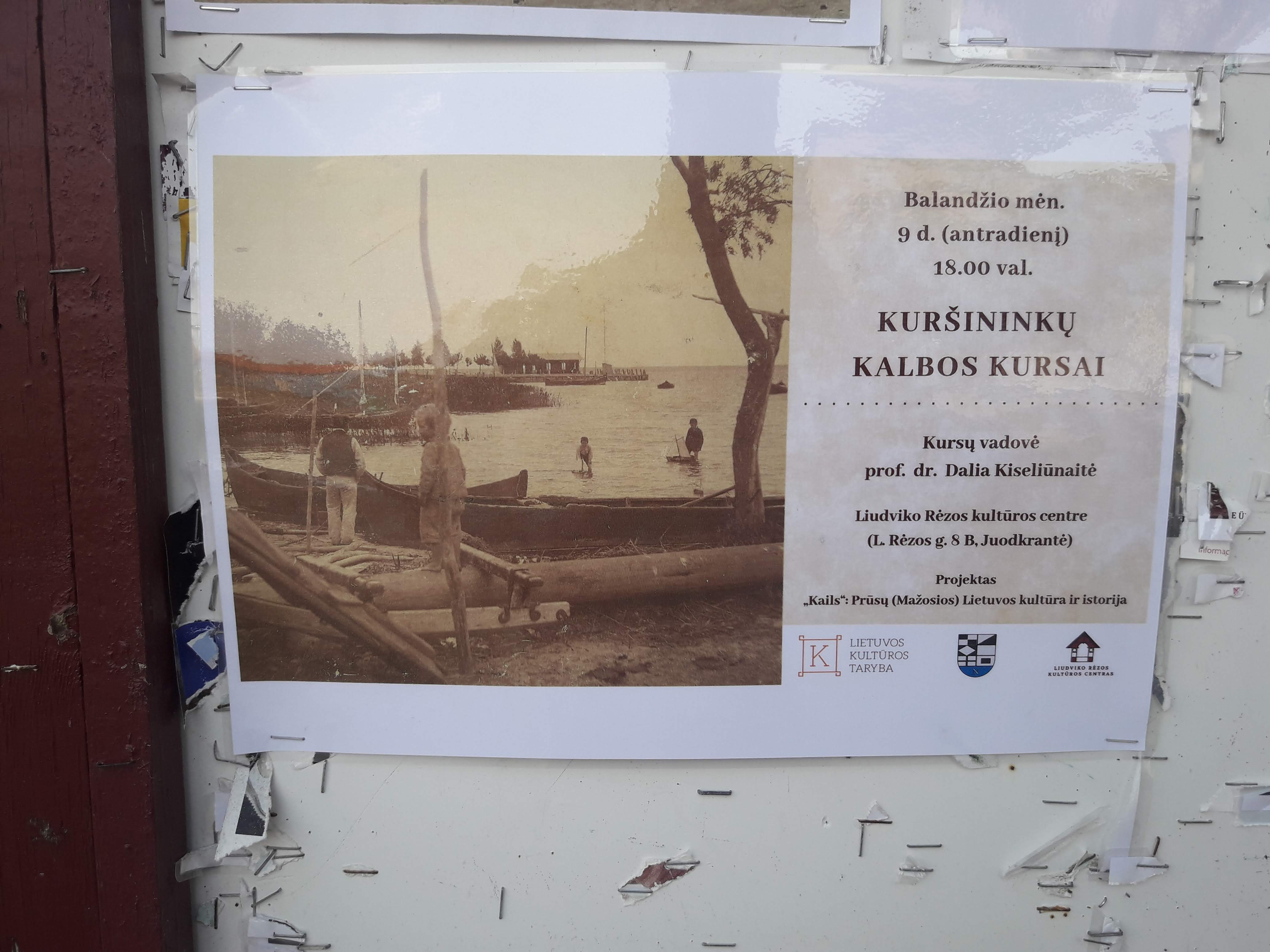
An advertisement in Lithuanian for Kursenieki language classes in Juodkrantė

Several pages of sample texts in Kursenieki language are included in the 1888 monograph Über die Sprache der preussischen Letten by Adalbert Bezzenberger and the 1927 monograph Kursenieku valoda by Juris Plāķis, where they describe the language spoken by the inhabitants of the Curonian Spit.

There is a 2002 documentary film Tarp aštuonių vėjų ("Amidst Eight Winds") by Arvydas Barysas about the endangered Kursenieki language. The film, introducing the Curonian Spit, speaks about three brothers Sakutis (plural: Sakučiai) who had moved from the Spit to Sweden about 60 years ago, but still speak "kuršiškai". In 2005, the film won the Best Overall Production Award at the second European Heritage Film Festival in Toblach (Italy) under the patronage of Europa Nostra.

== See also ==
- Curonian language
