= List of regional parks of Lithuania =

Lithuania has 30 regional parks and 1 protected landscape and 1 cultural reserve. All under V IUCN protected area category. Law on establishing regional parks took effect in 1992.

Name	Area (km^{2})	Area rank	Municipality
Anykščiai Regional Park	140.80	10	Anykščiai
Asveja Regional Park	109.70	17	Molėtai, Švenčionys, Vilnius
Aukštadvaris Regional Park	153.50	7	Trakai, Prienai, Kaišiadorys
Biržai Regional Park	140.30	11	Biržai, Pasvalys
Dieveniškės Regional Park	87.94	23	Šalčininkai
Dubysa Regional Park	89.00	22	Raseiniai, Kelmė
Gražutė Regional Park	242.30	4	Zarasai, Ignalina
Kaunas Reservoir Regional Park	96.00	21	Kaunas district, Kaišiadorys, Kaunas city
Krekenava Regional Park	86.80	25	Panevėžys, Kėdainiai
Kurtuvėnai Regional Park	150.90	8	Kelmė, Šiauliai
Labanoras Regional Park	553.43	1	Švenčionys, Molėtai, Utena, Ignalina
Meteliai Regional Park	177.29	6	Lazdijai, Alytus
Nemunas Delta Regional Park	288.70	3	Šilutė
Nemunas Loops Regional Park	240.80	5	Prienai, Birštonas, Alytus, Kaišiadorys
Neris Regional Park	99.00	19	Vilnius, Elektrėnai, Trakai
Pagramantis Regional Park	144.20	9	Tauragė, Šilalė
Pajūris Regional Park	58.70	26	Klaipėda district, Palanga, Klaipėda city
Panemunių Regional Park	115.63	15	Šakiai, Jurbarkas, Kaunas
Pavilniai Regional Park	20.10	30	Vilnius
Rambynas Regional Park	45.20	28	Pagėgiai
Salantai Regional Park	136.30	13	Kretinga, Skuodas, Plungė
Sartai Regional Park	136.50	12	Rokiškis, Zarasai
Sirvėta Regional Park	86.80	24	Švenčionys, Ignalina
Tytuvėnai Regional Park	114.30	16	Kelmė, Raseiniai
Varniai Regional Park	338.00	2	Telšiai, Šilalė, Kelmė
Veisiejai Regional Park	122.00	14	Lazdijai
Venta Regional Park	106.30	18	Akmenė, Mažeikiai, Šiauliai
Verkiai Regional Park	27.31	29	Vilnius city, Vilnius district
Vištytis Regional Park	97.00	20	Vilkaviškis
Žagarė Regional Park	49.30	27	Joniškis
Girija Landscape Reserve	1.26	32	Vilnius
Kernavė State Cultural Reserve	1.94	31	Širvintos

== See also ==
- List of protected areas of Lithuania
