= Bitėnai =

- Village
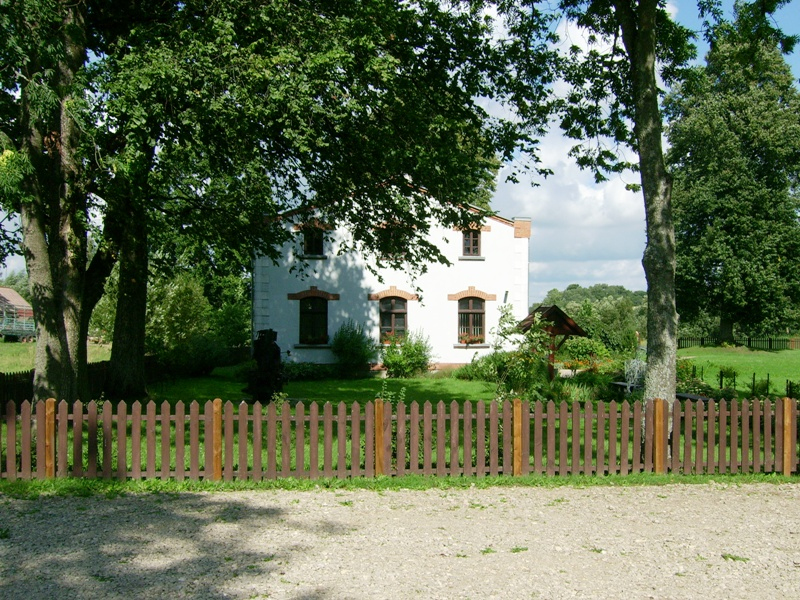
- Reconstructed printing press of Martynas Jankus

- Location of Bitėnai
- Coordinates: 55°4′53″N 22°2′47″E
- Country: Lithuania
- County: Tauragė County
- Municipality: Pagėgiai Municipality
- Eldership: Šatrininkai Eldership

Population (2011)
  - Total: 76
- Time zone: UTC+2 (EET)
  - Summer (DST): UTC+3 (EEST)

Bitėnai (German: Bittehnen) is a small village in the Pagėgiai Municipality, in western Lithuania. According to the 2011 census, it had population of 76, a decline from 119 in 2001. It is situated along the Nemunas River near the Rambynas hill and is known as the location of the Martynas Jankus printing press. Jankus Museum and the visitors' center of the Rambynas Regional Park are located in the village.

== History ==
Bitėnai was a village of peasants and fishermen. In 1454, King Casimir IV Jagiellon incorporated the region to the Kingdom of Poland upon the request of the anti-Teutonic Prussian Confederation. After the subsequent Thirteen Years' War (1454–1466) the village was a part of Poland as a fief held by the Teutonic Knights, and thus was located within the Polish–Lithuanian union, later elevated to the Polish–Lithuanian Commonwealth. From the 18th century, it was part of the Kingdom of Prussia, and from 1871 it was also part of Germany, within which it was administratively located in the province of East Prussia. The village was a frequent resting place for those traveling via the Neman River. It developed in two sections: the southern Šilėnai (along the Žiogis rivulet) and the larger more densely populated northern Užbičiai (along the Bitė rivulet). The village had a wind mill, an inn, a police station, a dairy. Its primary school is known from the 18th century. The village belonged to the manor of Šereitlaukis. The village gained prominence during the Lithuanian press ban when Martynas Jankus moved his printing press from Tilsit (now Sovetsk) to Bitėnai in 1892. The printing press operated until 1909 and published six short-lived Lithuanian-language periodicals and 104 books. Many of these publications were brought by the Lithuanian book smugglers to Lithuanian lands located in the Russian Empire since the Partitions of the Polish–Lithuanian Commonwealth.

After the Klaipėda Revolt in 1923, Bitėnai became a part of independent Lithuania. In 1926, the village had 72 homesteads and its population reached 391 in 1941. Due to its proximity to the Rambynas hill, Bitėnai developed as a kind of resort and boasted three restaurants. It was occupied by Germany in 1939–1945. It was depopulated during the evacuation of East Prussia and the subsequent expulsion of Germans. About 80% of the village's buildings, including the former printing press of Jankus, were destroyed. The population declined from 287 in 1959 to 120 in 1989. In 1986, there were only 26 homesteads in the village.

Bitėnai is part of the Rambynas Regional Park, established in 1992. The village is home to the park's administration (established in 2001) and visitors' center (established in 2012 in a pre-World war II restaurant).

== Heritage ==
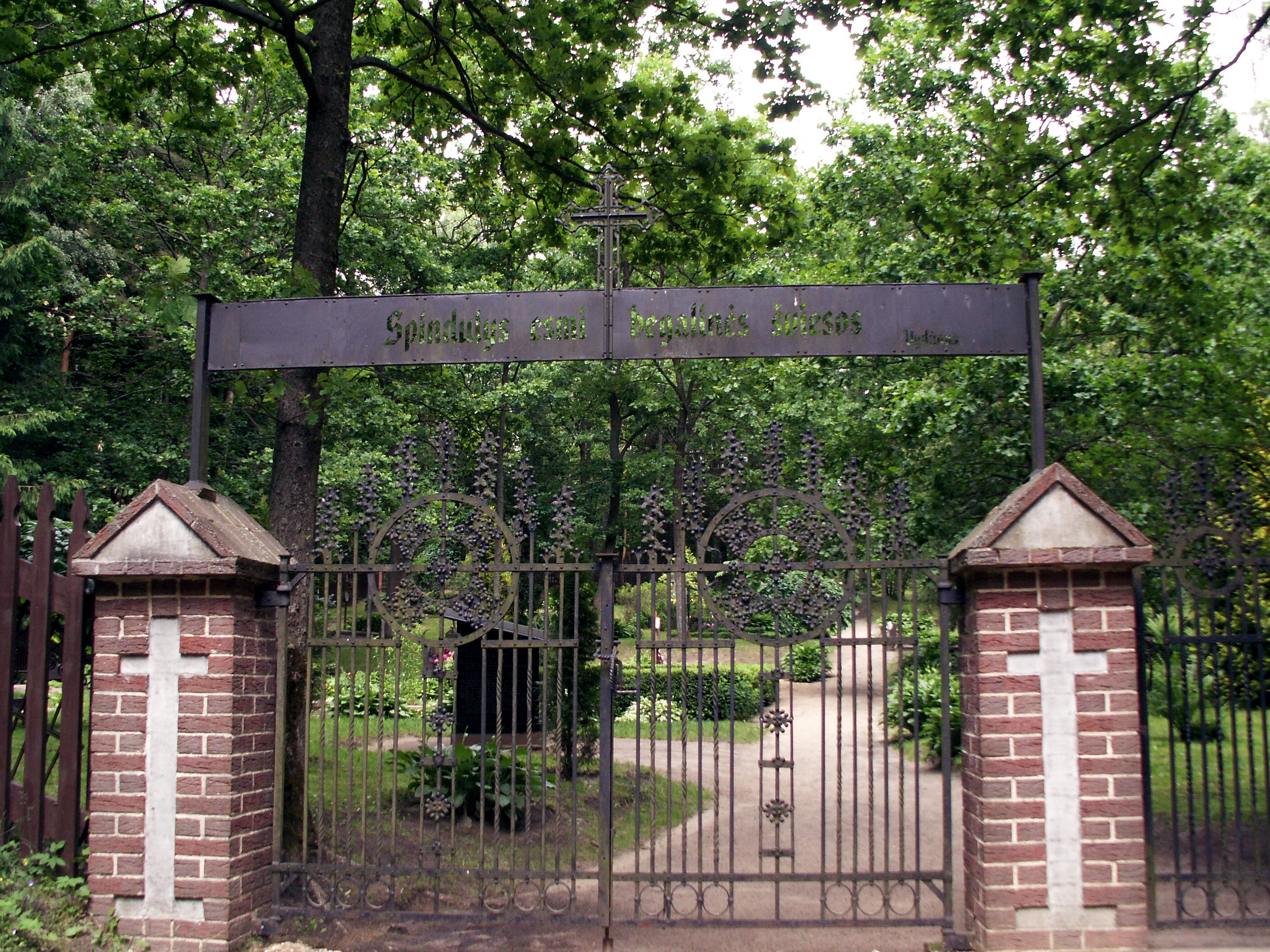
Entrance to Bitėnai cemetery

In 1972, a memorial column with a bell was built near the destroyed printing press of Jankus. A memorial exposition dedicated to Jankus was unveiled in May 1981. It was housed at the primary school until the printing press was rebuilt in 1998 and the Martynas Jankus Museum officially opened in July 1999. In 2015, the museum reconstructed Jankus' granary over the authentic arched red-brick cellar.

The village cemetery located between Bitėnai and the Rambynas hill date as far back as the early 18th century. There are small mounds around the cemetery that resemble tumuli. There were some reports of archaeological finds in the area, but in 1991 it was determined that the mounds are natural sand dunes. The cemetery was neglected and vandalized during the Soviet era – extensive damage was done during searches for the legendary treasure of Napoleon Bonaparte that was allegedly buried during the French invasion of Russia somewhere near the Rambynas hill. After Lithuania regained independence in 1990, the cemetery was reconstructed and chosen as the re-interment place for the remains of philosopher Vydūnas. His remains were moved from West Germany and reburied on 19 October 1991. Martynas Jankus was reburied on 30 May 1993. Other notable reburials include composer Valteris Kristupas Banaitis (1999), political activist Jonas Vanagaitis (2009), doctor and activist Valteris Didžys (2013). Memorial monuments commemorate other personalities of Lithuania Minor – Kristijonas Donelaitis Martynas Mažvydas, Ludwig Rhesa. The cemetery is developed as a pantheon of Lithuania Minor.

In 1996, German writer Ulla Lachauer published Paradise Road (Paradiesstraße. Lebenserinnerungen der ostpreußischen Bäuerin Lena Grigoleit), a memoir by Lena Grigoleit (Elena Grigolaitytė-Kondratavičienė). Grigoleit and her family were displaced three times, but each time returned to Bitėnai showcasing the turbulent history of the region. Her mother was deported to Russia during World War I; the family evacuated to Germany at the end of World War II but returned when they were overrun by the Red Army; the family was then deported by the Soviets to the Krasnoyarsk Krai in 1951 but returned in 1956.
