= Stoniškiai =

- Village
- Coat of arms

- Location of Pagėgiai
- Coordinates: 55°11′50″N 21°45′25″E
- Country: Lithuania
- Ethnographic region: Lithuania Minor
- County: Tauragė County
- Municipality: Pagėgiai Municipality
- Eldership: Stoniškiai eldership
- Capital of: Stoniškiai eldership

Population (2011)
  - Total: 178
- Time zone: UTC+2 (EET)
  - Summer (DST): UTC+3 (EEST)

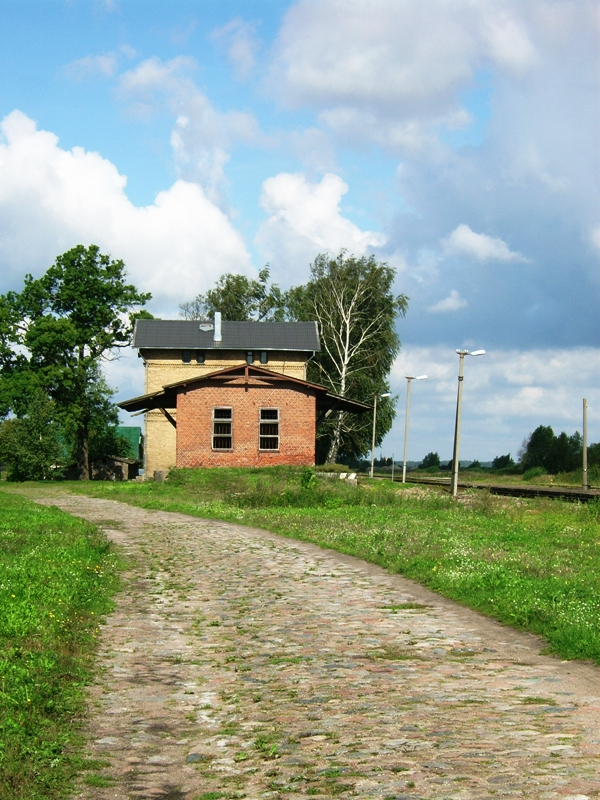
Stoniškiai rail station

Stoniškiai is a village in the south western Lithuania. It is located in the region of the former Baltic tribe of Skalvians. It is the capital of Stoniškiai eldership (Stoniškių seniūnija) of Pagėgiai Municipality, and as such it is part of Tauragė County.

== History ==
The name of the village is derived from Stonys, Stonis (Lithuanian family names). Stoniškiai was first mentioned in 1785.

In the second half of the 19th century, there was a highway and a railroad, so the village became a transport hub and grew a bit faster. In 1905, 136 people lived in Stoniškiai. In the interwar period, Sportverein Stonischken (1923: Möwe Stoniškiai) was one of the most powerful football teams of Lithuania Minor outside Klaipėda.

== Stoniškiai eldership ==
2279 people live in Stoniškiai eldership, lit. Stoniškių seniūnija (January 2013). The territory of the eldership covers an area of 13400 ha.

== Stoniškiai school ==
In 1890, a school in Rukai founded. In 1945, Stoniškiai primary school was established. In 1950, a seven-year-old school was established, followed by a secondary school. In 1959, the first class of abitur graduated from the school. From 2004, there was a Stoniškiai comprehensive school and since 2013 Stoniškiai comprehensive school of Pagėgiai municipality (Pagėgių sav. Stoniškių pagrindinė mokykla).

== Opocal field ==
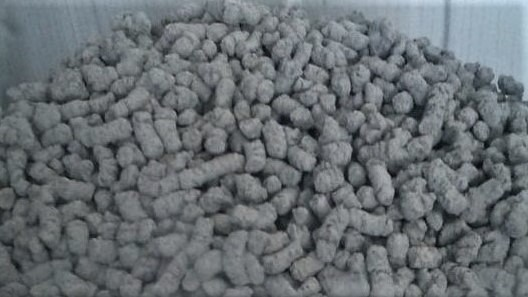
Opoka granules for oil absorption

Stoniškiai has the best-explored opoka field in Lithuania with an area of over 25 ha. It is estimated that the field has 17.8 million tonnes of opoka.
