= Pagėgiai Eldership =

Eldership of Lithuania

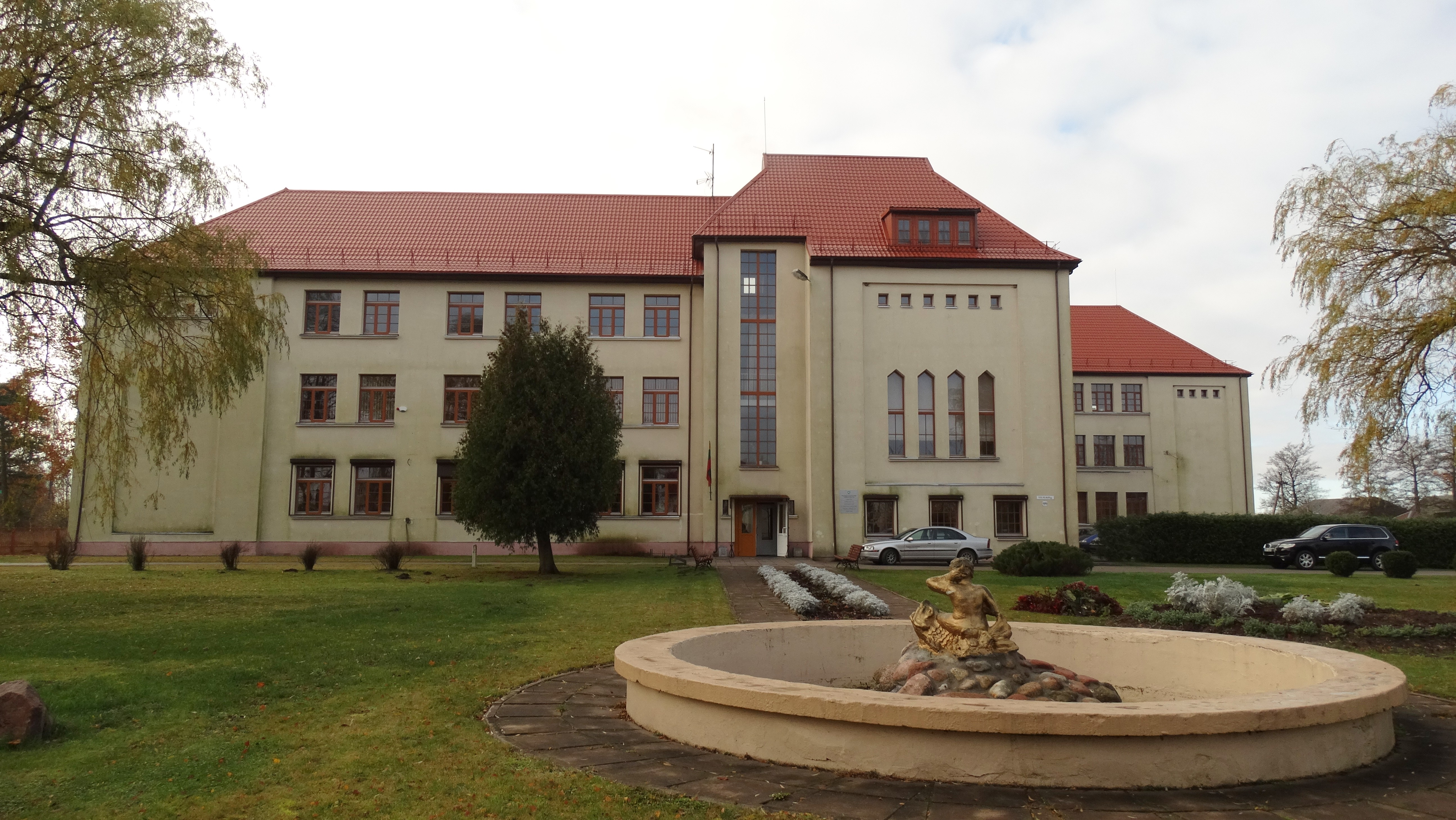
Building in Eldership of Pagėgiai , Lithuania

The Pagėgiai Eldership (Lithuanian: Pagėgių seniūnija) is an eldership of Lithuania, located in the Pagėgiai Municipality. In 2021 its population was 3196.
