= Lumpėnai Eldership =

Eldership of Lithuania

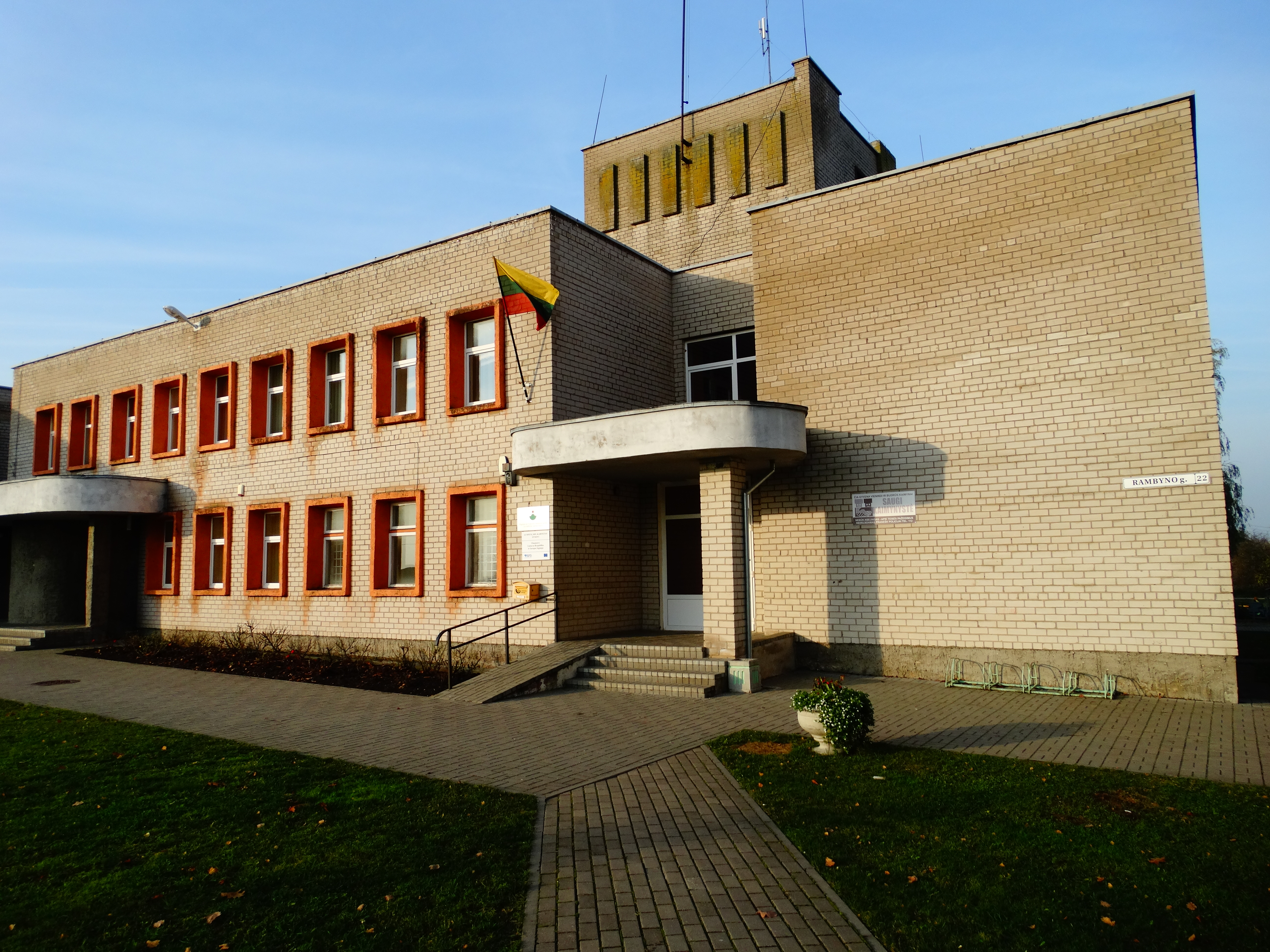
Eldership, Lumpėnai, Pagėgiai Municipality, Lithuania

The Lumpėnai Eldership (Lithuanian: Lumpėnų seniūnija) is an eldership of Lithuania, located in the Pagėgiai Municipality. In 2021 its population was 843.
