= Vilkyškiai Eldership =

Eldership of Lithuania

The Vilkyškiai Eldership (Lithuanian: Vilkyškių seniūnija) is an eldership of Lithuania, located in the Pagėgiai Municipality. In 2021 its population was 1213.
