= Stoniškiai Eldership =

Eldership of Lithuania

The Stoniškiai Eldership (Lithuanian: Stoniškių seniūnija) is an eldership of Lithuania, located in the Pagėgiai Municipality. In 2021 its population was 1534.
