= Natkiškiai Eldership =

Eldership of Lithuania

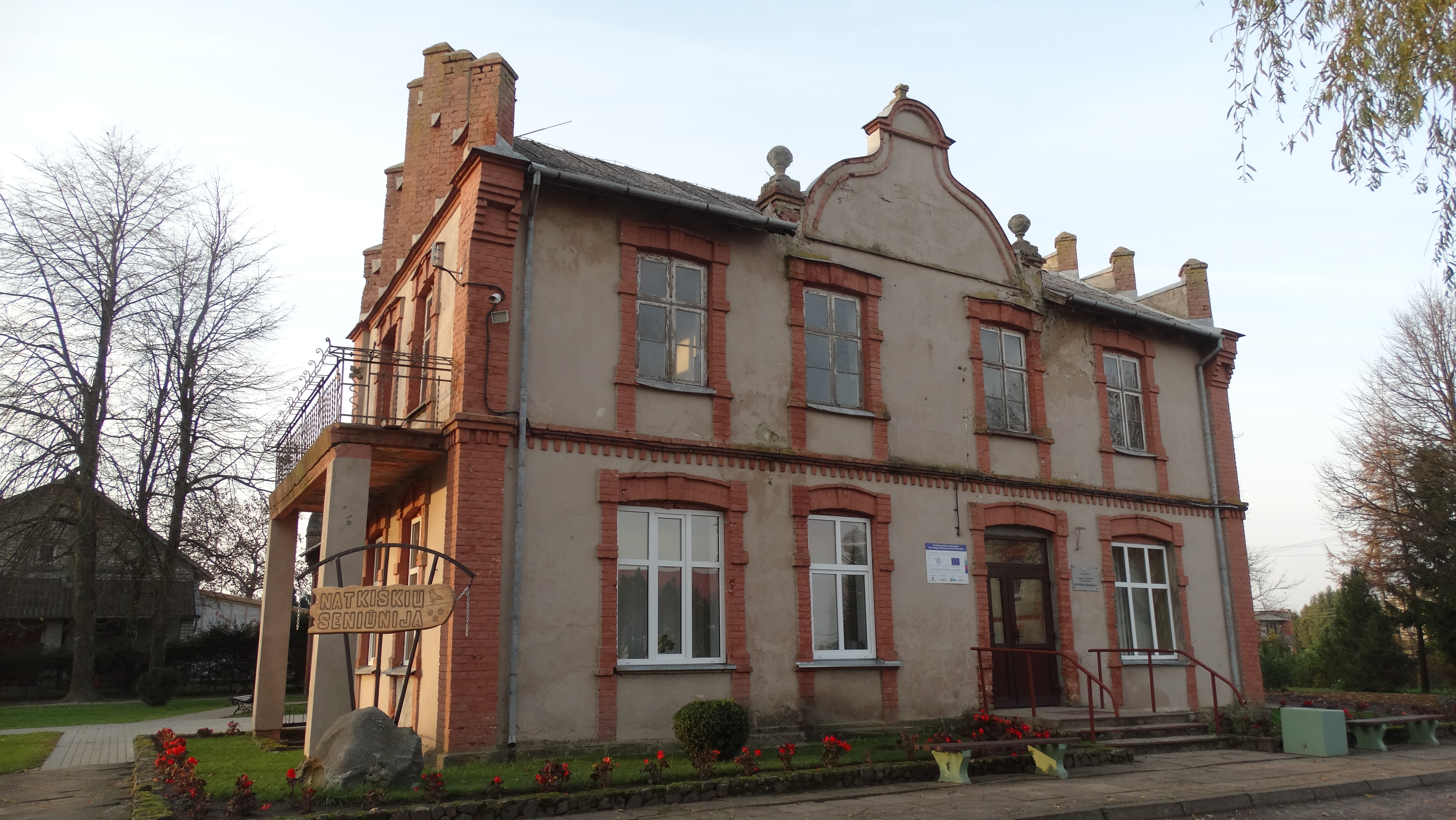
Eldership, Natkiškiai, Pagėgiai Municipality, Lithuania

The Natkiškiai Eldership (Lithuanian: Natkiškių seniūnija) is an eldership of Lithuania, located in the Pagėgiai Municipality. In 2021 its population was 654.
