= Albrecht Gustav von Manstein =

Prussian general (1805–1877)

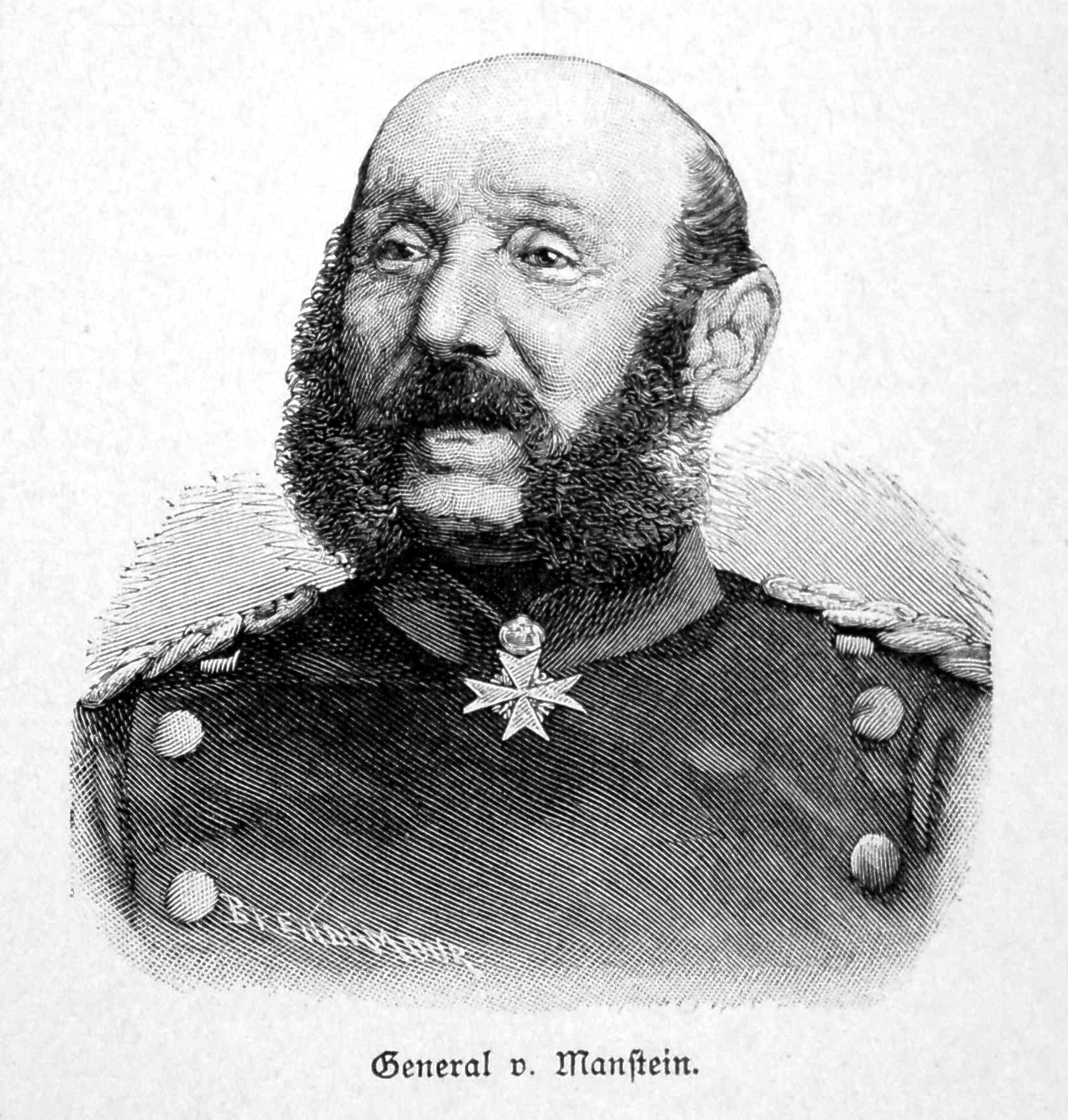
- Born: Albert Ehrenreich Gustav von Manstein; 24 August 1805; Willkischken, Kingdom of Prussia
- Died: 11 May 1877 (aged 71); Flensburg, German Empire
- Relatives: Erich von Manstein
- Military career
- Allegiance: Kingdom of Prussia; German Empire
- Branch: Prussian Army
- Service years: 1822–1873
- Rank: General of the Infantry
- Unit: 6th Infantry Division
- Commands: IX Corps
- Conflicts: Second Schleswig War; Austro-Prussian War; Franco-Prussian War
- Awards: Pour le Mérite; Military Order of Maria Theresa; Order of St. George

Albert Ehrenreich Gustav von Manstein (24 August 1805 in Willkischken – 11 May 1877 in Flensburg) was a Prussian general who served during the Austro-Prussian War and the Franco-Prussian War. He was the adoptive grandfather of Erich von Manstein.

== Biography ==
Manstein entered the 3rd Infantry Regiment in 1822. In 1841 he was promoted to first lieutenant and he became an adjutant on the staff of the I Army Corps. By 1864 he had been promoted to the rank of Major General (Generalleutnant) and given command of the 6th Infantry Division, which he led during the Second Schleswig War in the Battle of Dybbøl and at Als. During the Austro-Prussian War he commanded the reserve of the First Army, which he led during the battle of Königgrätz and for which he was awarded the Pour le Mérite.

In 1867, Manstein was given command of IX Corps and was promoted to General der Infanterie in 1868. When the Franco-German War started in August 1870, IX Corps became part of the Second Army of Prince Friedrich Karl. Manstein and his Corps distinguished themselves at Gravelotte. After the fall of the Second Empire, Manstein fought in the Loire Valley in the campaigns at Orleans and Le Mans. For his services during the war he was awarded 100.000 thalers. He retired in 1873.

== Honours and awards ==
- Kingdom of Prussia:
  - Knight of the Order of the Red Eagle, 1st Class with Oak Leaves and Swords, 1864; Grand Cross with Oak Leaves and Swords on Ring (50 years), 3 October 1872
  - Pour le Mérite (military), 21 April 1864; with Oak Leaves, 20 September 1866
  - Service Award Cross
  - Iron Cross (1870), 1st Class with 2nd Class on Black Band
  - Grand Commander's Cross of the Royal House Order of Hohenzollern, with Swords and in Diamonds, 16 June 1871
  - Knight of the Order of the Black Eagle, 29 July 1873
- Austrian Empire: Knight of the Military Order of Maria Theresa, 1864
- Grand Duchy of Hesse:
  - Grand Cross of the Ludwig Order
  - Military Merit Cross
- Mecklenburg:
  - Grand Cross of the House Order of the Wendish Crown, with Golden Crown
  - Military Merit Cross, 1st Class (Schwerin)
  - Cross for Distinction in War (Strelitz)
- Russian Empire: Knight of the Order of St. George, 4th Class, 27 December 1870
