= Rambynas Regional Park =

Coordinates: 55°5′N 22°5′E

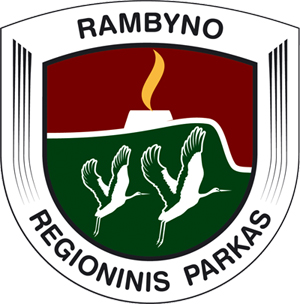
Rambynas Regional Park Emblem, Copyrights-Rambynas Regional Park

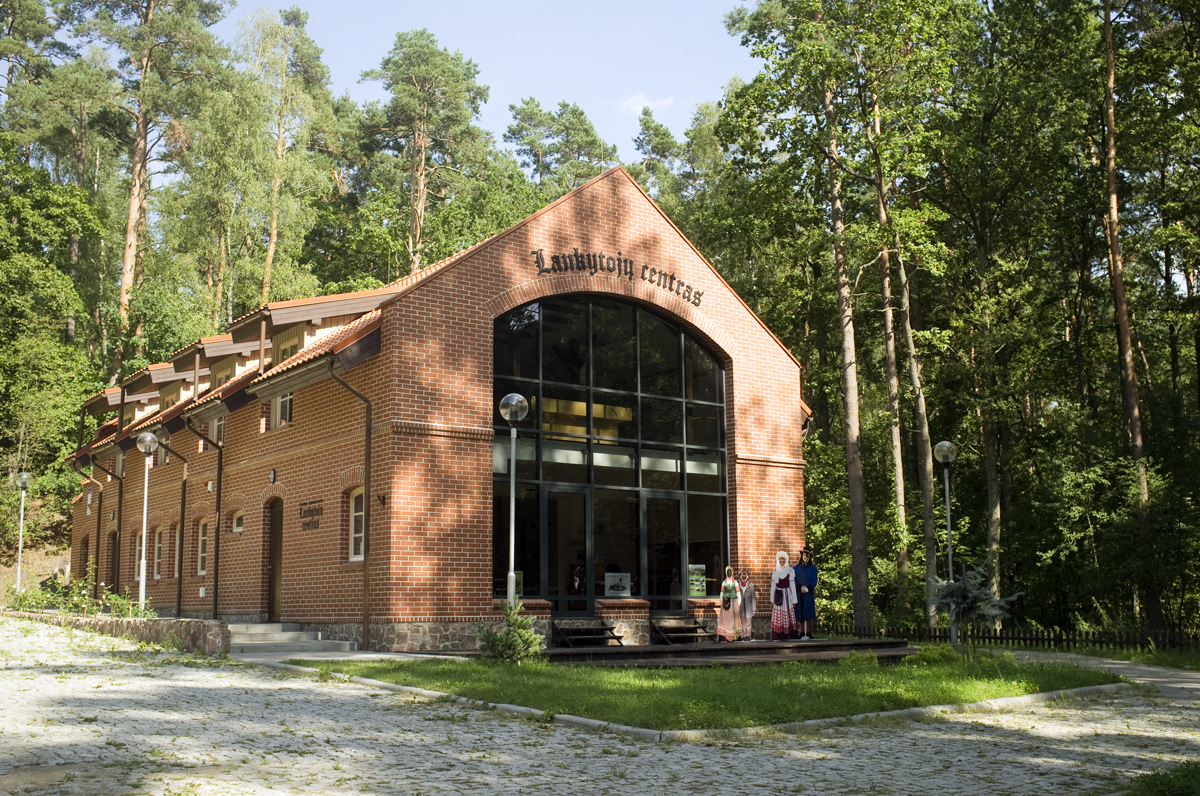
Rambynas Visitor Centre

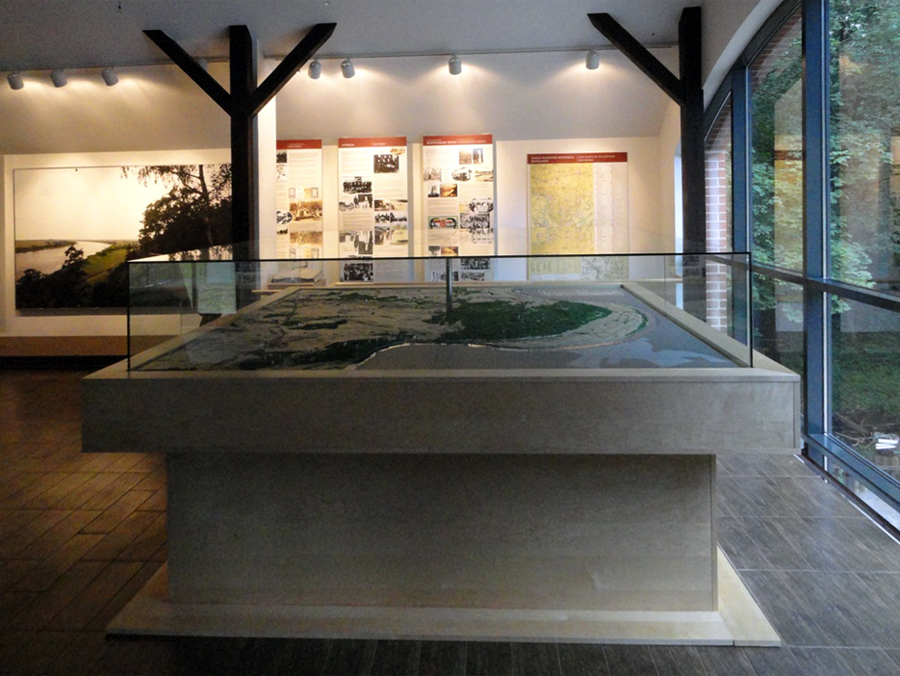
Rambynas Visitor Centre Exposition, Photo-1, Courtesy of Rambynas Regional Park Administration

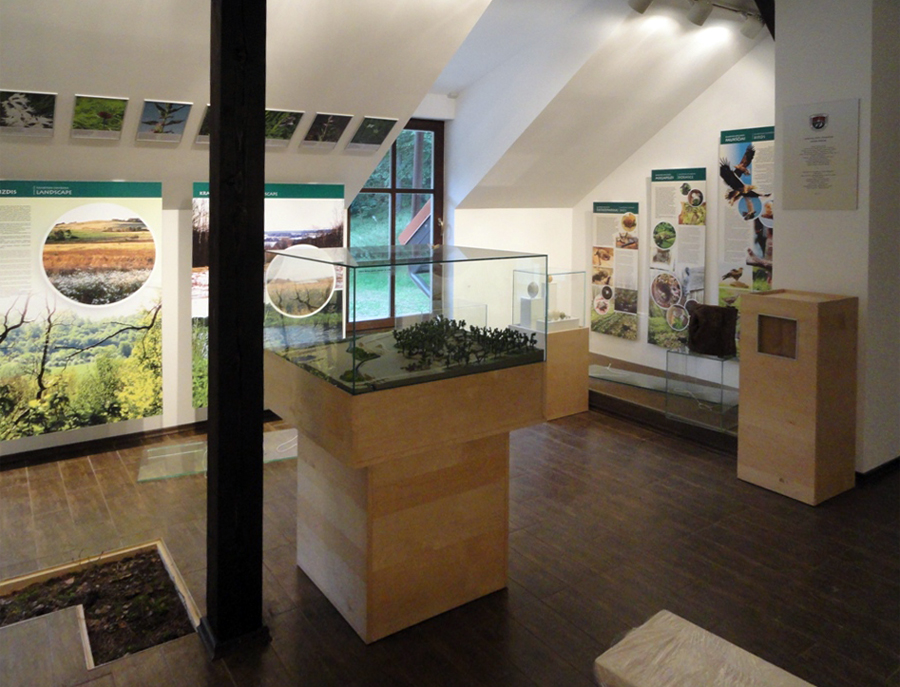
Rambynas Visitor Centre Exposition, Photo-3, Courtesy of Rambynas Regional Park Administration

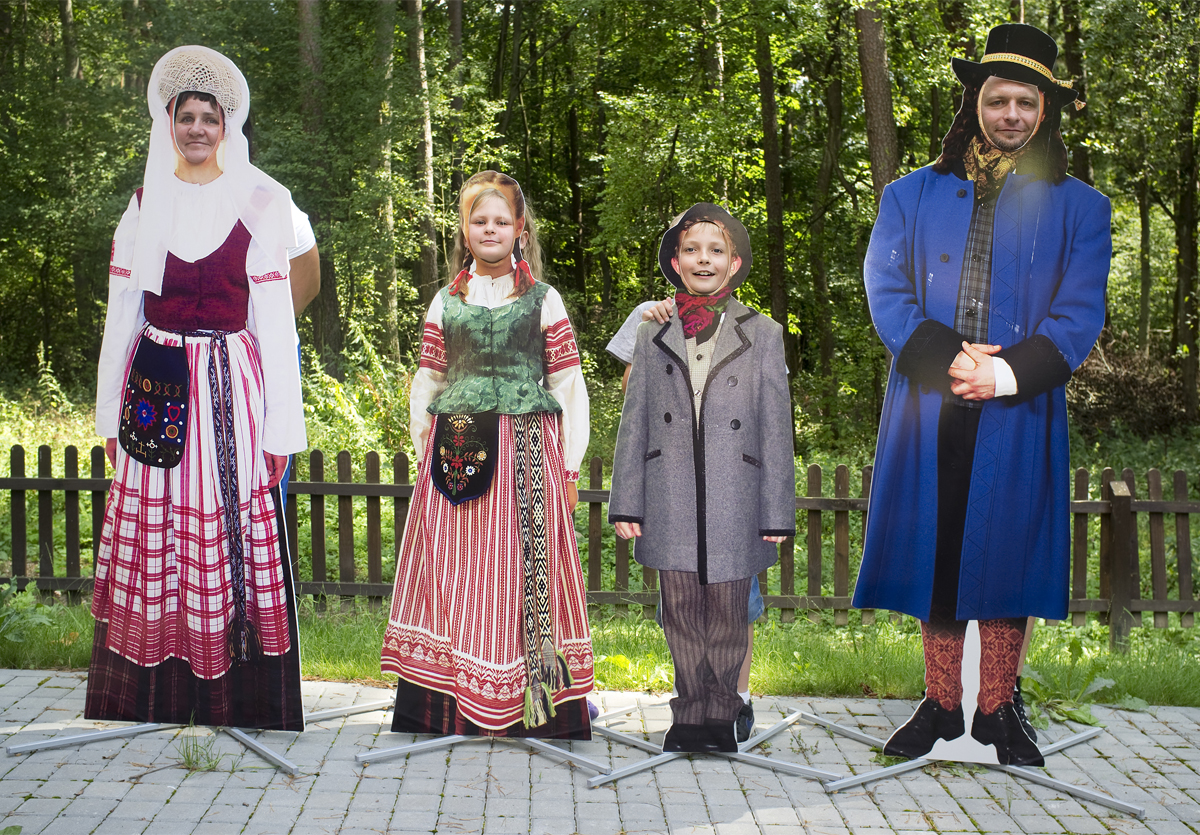
Lietuvininkai in traditional costumes (mock-ups)

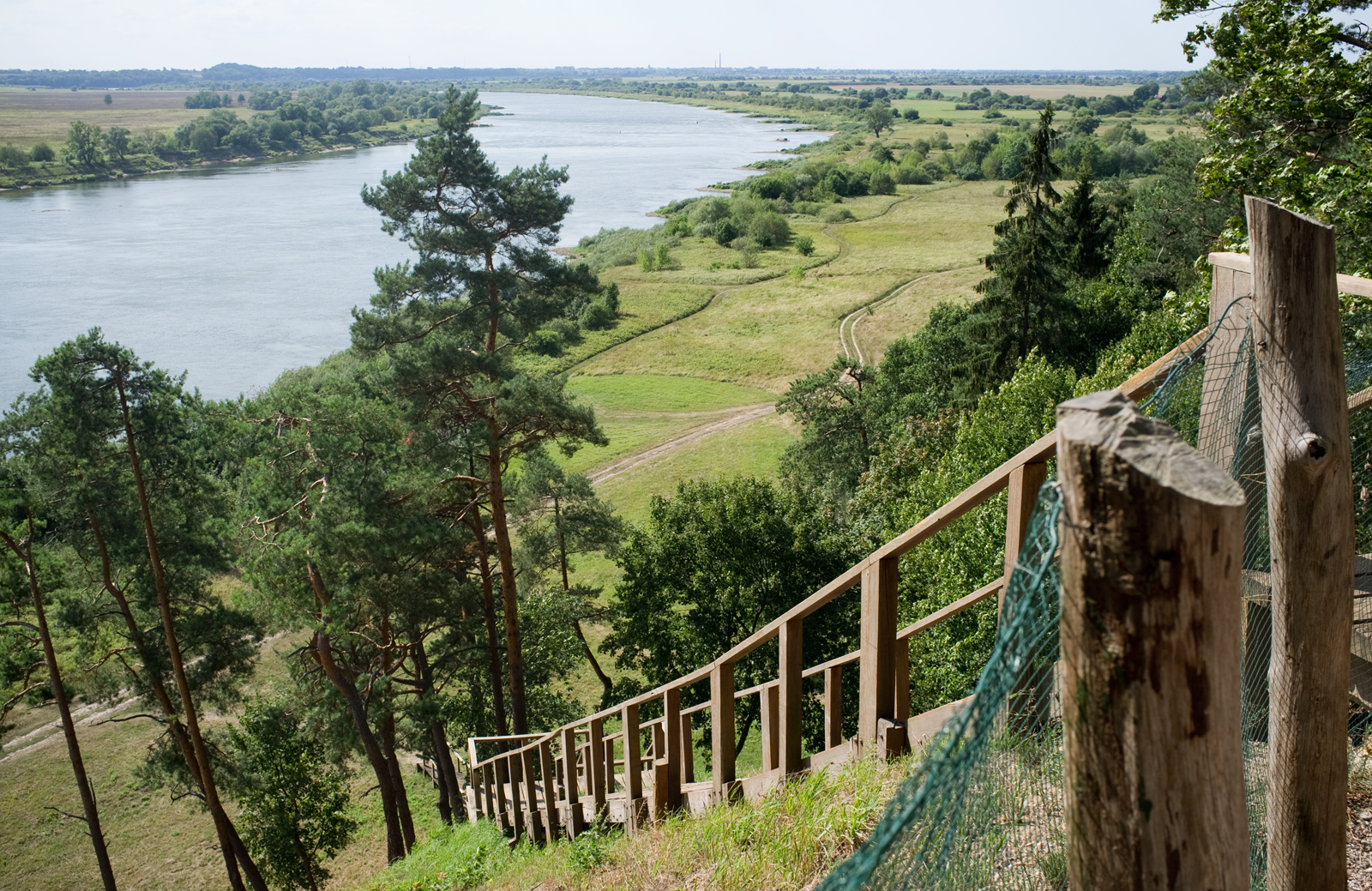
View at Nemunas river from Rambynas

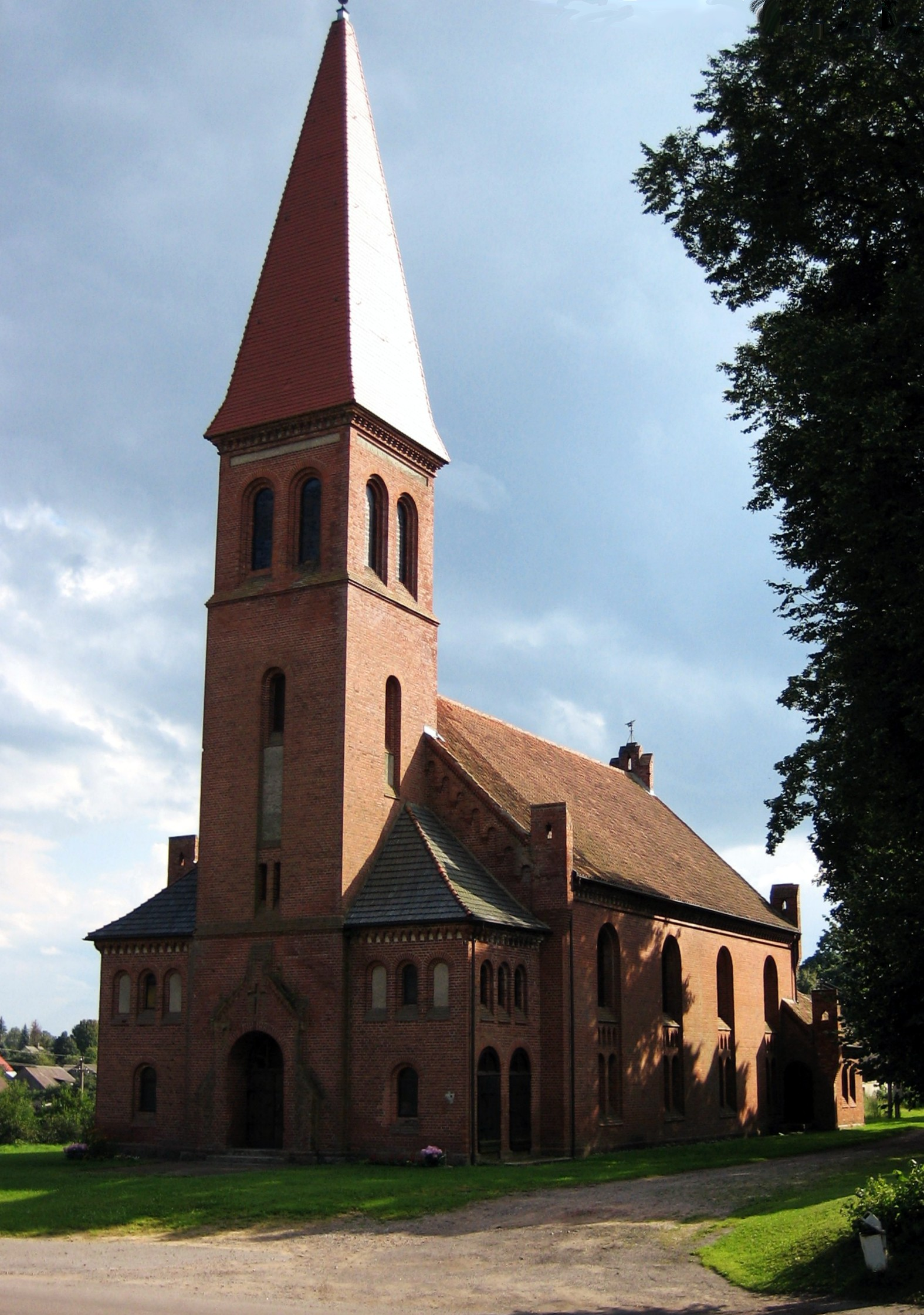
Vilkyškiai church

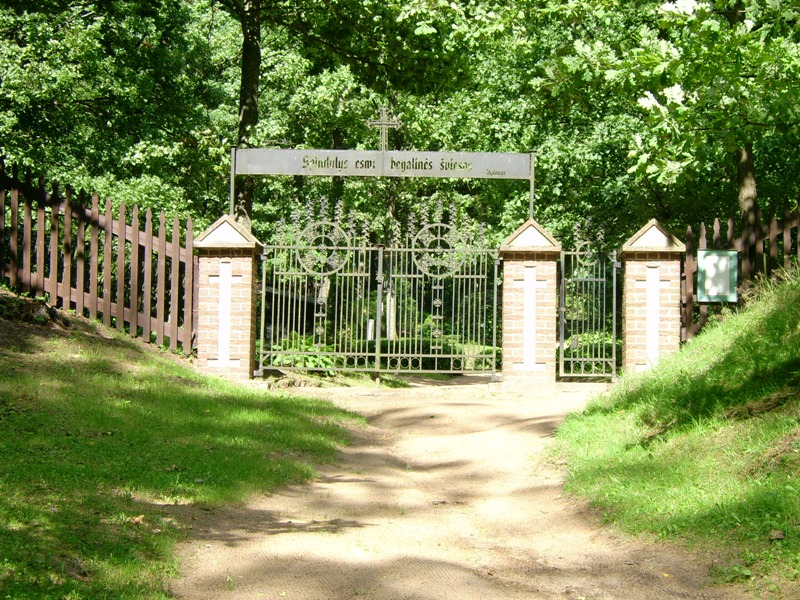
Lithuania Minor Pantheon - Bitėnai Cemetery

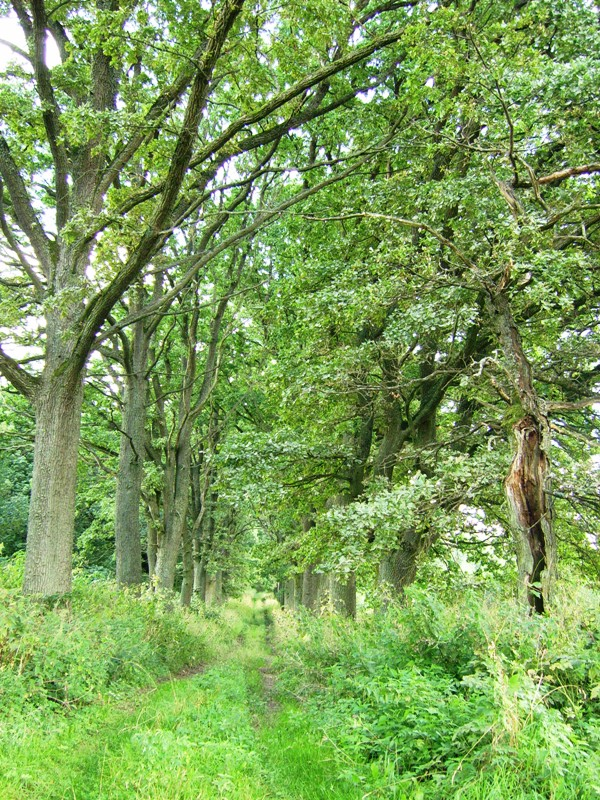
Oak Alley - Vilkyškiai

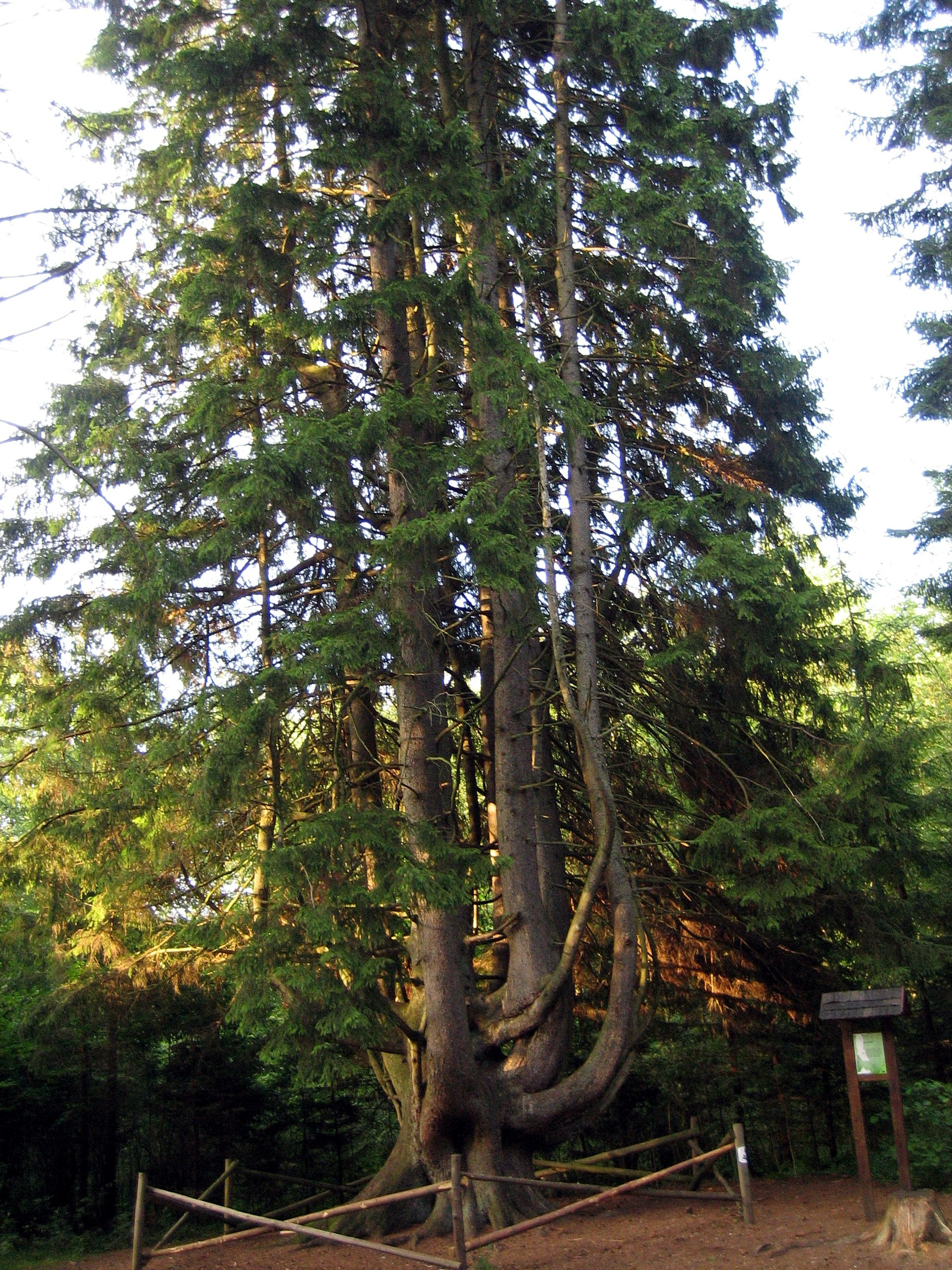
Natural Monument - Witches Spruce

Rambynas Regional Park is one of the Regional Parks in Lithuania, situated at Pagėgiai municipality (Tauragė County) on the right Nemunas river bend in Lithuania, near the border of Kaliningrad Oblast. The park was founded in 1992. It has an area of about 4,788 hectares (11,830 acres).

== About Rambynas Regional Park ==
The Rambynas Regional Park territory for its natural and cultural heritage has been divided into eight protection and conservation zones (83.6% of the total park area) which are:

- Bitėnai Geomorphological Reserve
- Šilėnai Botanical Reserve
- Bitėnai Botanical and Zoological Reserve
- Ragainė Inflection Hydro-logical Reserve
- Šereitlaukis Architectural Reserve
- Jūra River Ichtiological Reserve
- Vilkyškių Geo-morphological Reserve
- Vilkyškiai Urban Reserve

Other areas include: recreation areas (3.2%), defense areas (7.2%), business areas (6, 0% of the total park area) and a park territory tangled in a relatively dense network of roads with about 5.4 km of roads in an area of 100 acres.

Among the eight park reserves the biggest protected park attractions are - the Nemunas valley landscape, Wetland meadows and their typical flora communities, Rambynas hill and its woods, Bitėnai and Bardėnai villages with preserved natural and cultural attractions, The ridge crest of Vilkyškiai, Regional forests characterized by a variety of woods, The environment of Šereitlaukis estate, The old town of Vilkyškiai and unique white stork colonies nesting in the pine trees. In the park area, there are eight villages: Bitėnai, Bardinai, Šereitlaukis, Opstainys, Pempynė, Vilkyškiai and part of Lumpėnai, with a population of 1340 inhabitants, 247 hectares of water ponds (5.1% of the park area).

13 kilometers from the Nemunas and Jūra river confluence to the Rambynas park boundary is the largest river in Lithuania, the Nemunas, and the Lithuanian state border with Russia's Kaliningrad enclave. The Nemunas valley is washed with 33 old river lakes, the largest - the Merguva (44.8 ha) and Bitežeris (13.8 ha).

== Protected Areas Management - "Phase I" and "Phase II" ==
State Service for Protected Areas under the Ministry of the Environment, together with a number of Authorities for protected areas in Lithuania will implement the EU Structural Funds for the project “Protected Areas Management"

The project objectives are:

- Facilitate public access to protected environments
- Facilitate visits to protected areas without harming the environment
- Create conditions for the “Natura 2000” sites improvement

“Phase I” completion of the following activities:

Organisation and adaption of 4 heritage sites for visitors:

- Rambynas new stone altar ensemble
- Opstainiai I ( Vilkyskiai, Raudondvaris ) mound, Opstainiai II mound, Šereiklaukis mound
- Completion of Rambynas Regional Park Visitors Center in the Bitėnai village
- Completion of Visitor Centre exposition and display stands

“Phase II” implementation and outgoing works of the following activities:

- Installation of field information system and visitors infrastructure
- Completed “Natura 2000” territory network of Šereiklaukis forest meadows (about 20 acres)

== Publications ==
In collaboration of Rambynas Regional Park direction and “Sandūra” Society in Pagėgiai implemented newspaper and magazine - almanac “Rambynas” publishing project. The newspaper “Rambynas” issued 2 times a year. This 8 -page publication is dedicated to Rambynas Regional Park residents and introduces park visitors to the park values also how Rambynas Regional Park Authority operates in a variety of topical issues related to the park. Magazine –almanac "Rambynas” released once a year. This is a richly illustrated 86 - page publication, a prominent Lithuanian historians and scientists examine Rambynas and Pagėgiai surrounding areas, as well as culture, history, environmental issues and to provide a wide popular readership of Lithuania Minor. The journal provides a summary in English language.

Press, Television, Radio Support Fund ( PTRSF) partially supports and funds project “Rambynas - Lithuania Minor ethnographic identity preservation" - already several years presented on magazine “Rambynas”.

== Park goals ==
- Preserve the Nemunas River landscape, its natural ecosystem and cultural heritage and manage park resources rationally.
- Protect existent natural and cultural heritage.
- Restore destroyed natural and cultural heritage.
- Observe, gather information and conservation of cultural heritage protection, promote the natural and cultural heritage and its protection.
- Tourism development, expansion and renewal of recreational areas.

== Places to visit ==
- An observation deck on the Rambynas hill (Beautiful Nemunas river valley view with its surrounding wetland planes)
- Lithuanian Minor pantheon - Bitėnai Cemetery (last resting place of many Lithuania Minor patrons and activists)
- Educational eco-tourism walking trails (Many kilometers of hiking and walking trails)
- White stork colony in Bitėnai village (Unique white stork colony nesting in pine trees (20-24 nests, depending on the year))
- Martynas Jankus Museum (Lithuania Minor patron and activist museum and exhibition)
- Šereiklaukis and Opstainiai (Vilkyškiai and Raudondvaris) mounds
- Barrow
- Place of Šereiklaukis Manor
- 39 “Oak Alley” (At the outskirts of Vilkyškiai woods stands 39 oak alley. Trees are 18–20 meters in height and size of 3–5 meters)
- Natural Monument "Witches Spruce" (Spruce declared a natural monument. Its height of 32 meter, 5 meters in waist and branching to the 18 stems. In 2007 after a major wind storms, one trunk break away, now it has 17 trunks)
- Vilkyškiai town urban reserve
- Viewing Platform ( Beautiful views from 15 meters high viewing platform of Merguva lake, wetland meadows and Ragainė (Neman) town in the distance)
- Rambynas Regional Park visitor centre and exposition (Modern visitor centre with exhibition, souvenir shop and place to rest)

The park contains several reserves established to protect both the nature (pine stands and oak stands) and ethnographic values in the (Bitėnai and Bardinai villages). Rambynas hill also belongs to the park territory. In nearby Vilkiškiai town, a number of old buildings representing the typical architecture of the area still exist.

== Landscape ==
The Nemunas river curve is surrounded by forests, the overgrown ridge crest of Vilkyškiai, covered with a variety of heights and shapes, continental dunes, the valley wetland flooded meadows, ancient lakes decorated with inlays that mark the beginning of the Nemunas delta. The landscape was formed by the last ice age, where the ice cap boundary was at the Rambynas.

== Nature ==
The hyssop (lat. Gratiola officinalis ) hedge is commonly found around the lake Merguva area. The hedge plant is used widely in pharmacy. Natures Monument - "Witches Spruce" - grows in Vilkyškiai forest. This is a 17 trunk spruce tree, nearby "Oak Alley", which is an object of Natural Heritage, can be found. In the centre of Bitėnai village a colony of white storks are located which in the summer time nest in the pine trees. The park area encounters 8 species of bats, of which, 5 are included in the Red Data Book of Lithuania (Book of highly endangered or near extinct animals and plants). In the woods of Šereiklaukis lives Fat Dormouse. In the Rambynas Regional Park 4 Wetland meadows and 8 forest habitats of European importance can also be found. Where Nemunas down the ridge of Vilkyškiai bends, nature and history have created a set of values with the shrine of the Skalvians tribe, Lithuanian national rebirth and a symbol of the book smuggling era - Rambynas hill, overlooking the views of the Ragainė, Tilžė and the beginning of the Nemunas Delta.

== Cultural heritage ==
Tribal life and battles with the crusaders are commemorated by the series of mounds built by Skalvians (Opstainiai, Vilkyškiai, Šereiklaukis) and the ancient villages, temples and Balts shrine - Rambynas. In later centuries this land and its manors speal of the former glory of the Vilkyskiai, Šereiklaukis and Pempynė estates. An urban reserve exists in Vilkyškiai with a school, rectory and the Evangelical Lutheran church buildings. Martynas Jankus homestead still called "Book-smugglers" Mecca can also be found there. In the forest near Rambynas is a tight graveyard called the pantheon of Lithuania Minor. This is the final resting place of Vydūnas, Martynas Jankus, V.K. Banaitis, A. Žvinakis and E. Grigolaitytė.

== Events ==
After World War II, Lithuania Minor has lost many of its people so the way of life, traditions and customs also ceased. But some festivals are still celebrated like St. John's festival and Užgavėnės (Ash Wednesday eve). Bitėnai - literature, printing and book-smuggling spot in Lithuania, so on Rambynas are celebrated “Book-smugglers” Day. In the late 19th century on Rambynas first time in Lithuania was staged “Lithuanian Song Festival” and performed first Lithuanian play.
