= Dieveniškės =

Town in Vilnius County, Lithuania

- Town
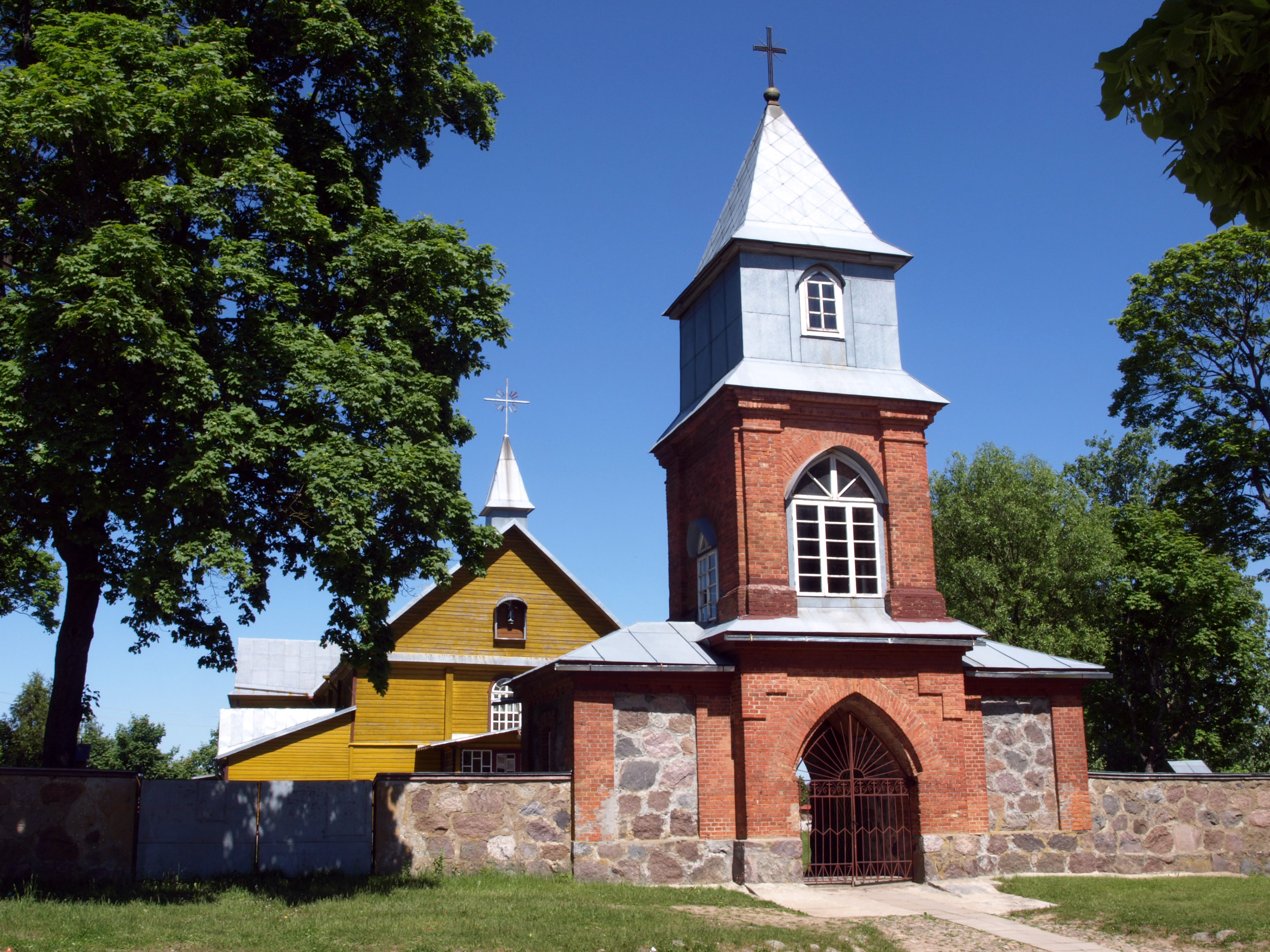

- Flag Coat of arms
- Interactive map of Dieveniškės
- Location of Dieveniškės
- Coordinates: 54°11′40″N 25°37′30″E
- Country: Lithuania
- Ethnographic region: Dzūkija
- County: Vilnius County
- Municipality: Šalčininkai district municipality
- Eldership: Dieveniškės eldership
- First mentioned: 1385

Area
  - Total: 0.47 km^{2} (0.18 sq mi)

Population (2021)
  - Total: 578
- Time zone: UTC+2 (EET)
  - Summer (DST): UTC+3 (EEST)

Dieveniškės (in Lithuanian literally: Place of gods; Polish: Dziewieniszki; Belarusian: Дзевянішкі Dzevyanishki; Yiddish: דיװענישאָק) is a town in the Vilnius County of Lithuania, about 6 kilometres (3.7 mi) from the Belarusian border in the so-called Dieveniškės appendix. It is surrounded by the Dieveniškės Regional Park.

== History ==
The estate of Dieveniškės was first mentioned in 1385 as a village of a Lithuanian noble Mykolas Mingaila, possibly the son of Gedgaudas, later ruled by the Goštautai family. Stanislovas Goštautas visited Dieveniškės with his wife Barbara Radziwill (Lithuanian: Barbora Radvilaitė), who used to pray in Dieveniškės church, built in the 16th century. According to the 1897 census, 75% of the village population was Jewish, and the town had two synagogues. The Jewish population was murdered during the Holocaust in Lithuania.

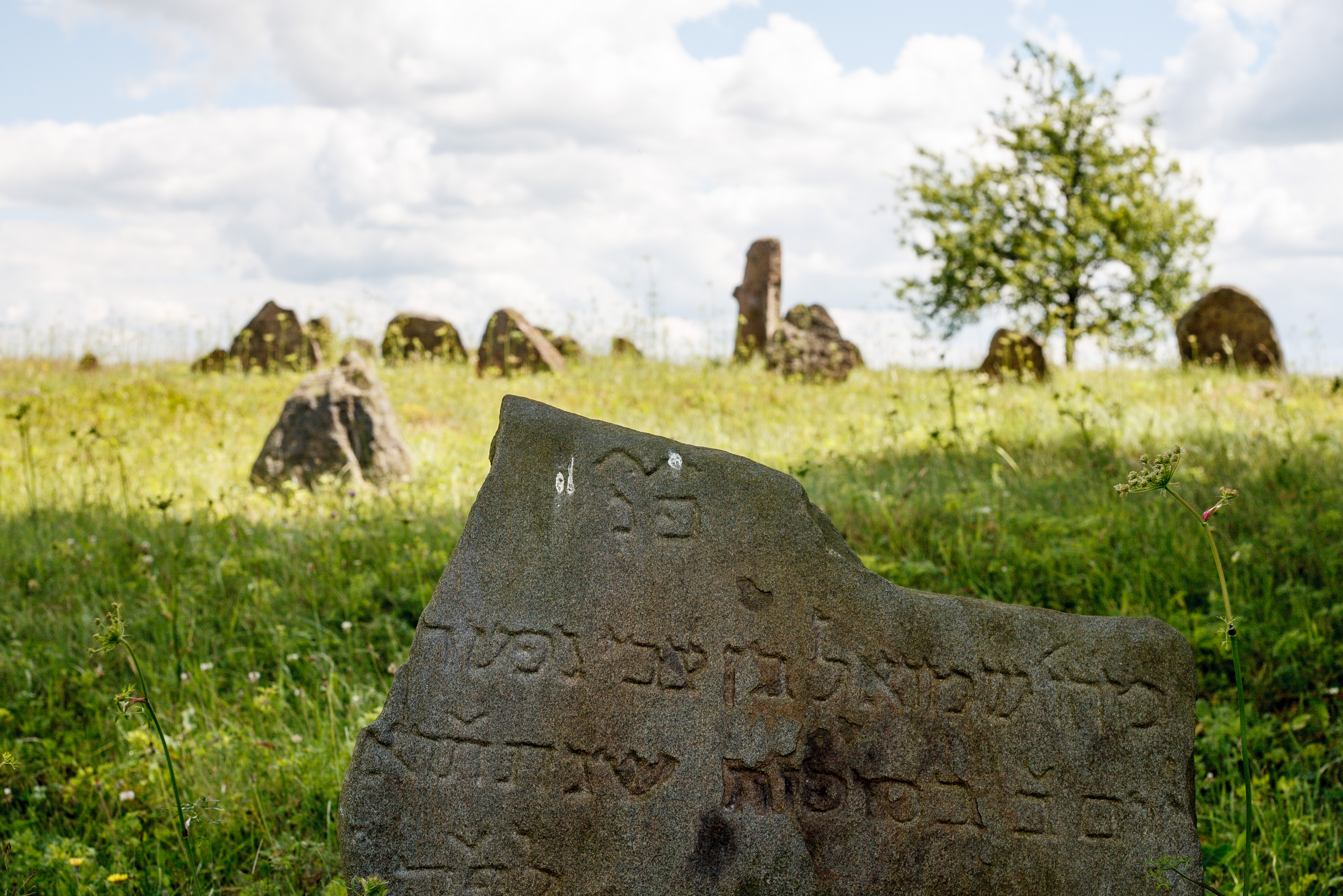
Jewish cemetery of the town.

The people living in the Dieveniškės were ethnically mixed (Lithuanian, Polish, Belarusian), when the region was assigned to Belarus post-1939. During 1939–40, the town belonged to the Byelorussian SSR. In April 1940 occupying Soviet authorities started deporting the town's residents to Siberia. At the beginning of the Nazi occupation, most of the Jews of Dieveniškės were forced out and imprisoned in the ghetto of Voranava and were executed on May 5, 1942. In 1944 the partisans of the Armia Krajowa captured Dieveniškės several times and harassed the local Lithuanian population.

According to local legend, Stalin's smoking pipe was lying on the map when the eastern Lithuanian borders were drawn in the Kremlin in 1939. Nobody dared to move it, so they drew a line around the smoking pipe. According to a more credible account, the Lithuanians of this mixed-ethnic region asked to be incorporated into Lithuania. Their request reached the Soviet authorities and on 6 November 1940 Dieveniškės was returned to Lithuania. This was done on the same day when Lithuania was annexed by USSR. As a result, Dieveniškės became a 207-square-kilometre Lithuanian salient surrounded by and projecting some 30 kilometres into the Belarusian territory. At its narrowest point, the “Lithuanian appendix” is less than 3 kilometres wide. In 1990, after Lithuania regained independence, borders with Belarus were once again adjusted. According to the 1989 census, slightly over 60 percent of residents considered themselves Polish.

In 2006 the coat of arms of Dieveniškės was adopted by a decree of the President of the Republic of Lithuania.

=== Ethnolinguistic changes ===
Historically, the Dieveniškės area formed a Lithuanian-speaking enclave (often referred to as a "linguistic island") separated from the main Lithuanian ethnolinguistic block, similar to the nearby enclaves of Pelesa and Gervėčiai.

A 2024 study using geospatial analysis of historical and modern data revealed a drastic decline in the Lithuanian-speaking population within the Dieveniškės "appendix" over the last century. While the area was historically a Lithuanian-speaking salient, statistical data indicates that the number of Lithuanian speakers decreased more than 13-fold between 1890 and 2021 (dropping from 7,108 to 523 inhabitants). This decline is attributed to long-term assimilation processes influenced by Slavic languages, a negative migration balance, and rapid population aging in the rural settlements of the region.
