= Tytuvėnai Regional Park =

Coordinates: 55°35′N 23°15′E

Tytuvėnai Regional Park was established in 1992 to preserve the hilly, marshy, laky landscape and the historical Šiluva and Tytuvėnai urban monuments in Lithuania. Parks administration and information center is located in Tytuvėnai, Miško street - 3.

== Territory ==
The park is situated in Raseiniai, Radviliškis and Kelme district junction in the middle west of Lithuania, Šiauliai county, Samogitia. The park territory is 18159 ha (181km2) of which 45% forests, 10% wetlands, 2% lakes, 42% other territories.

== Landscape ==
Expressive hilly, lake and swampy landscapes are the part of ice age heritage. Wavy hilly plains turn into lowlands, forming massive peatbogs. Viscous forests of Užpelkiai are located in a place of ice age lagoon, graceful sand hills and rocky pine forests. Spacious wetlands here are called Tyruliai.

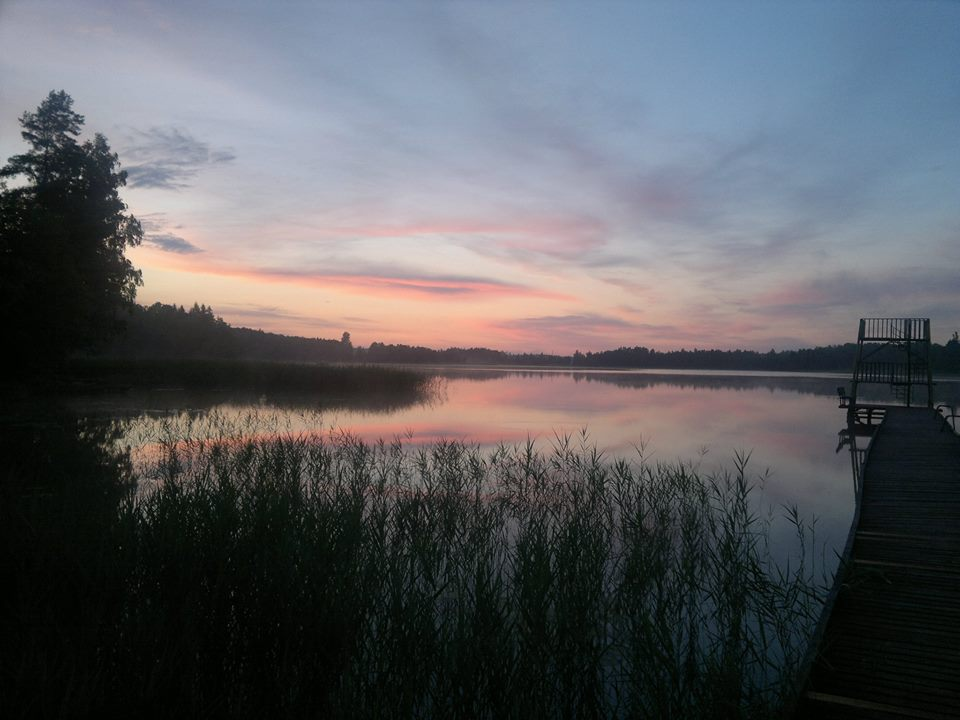
Gilius lake at a summer evening

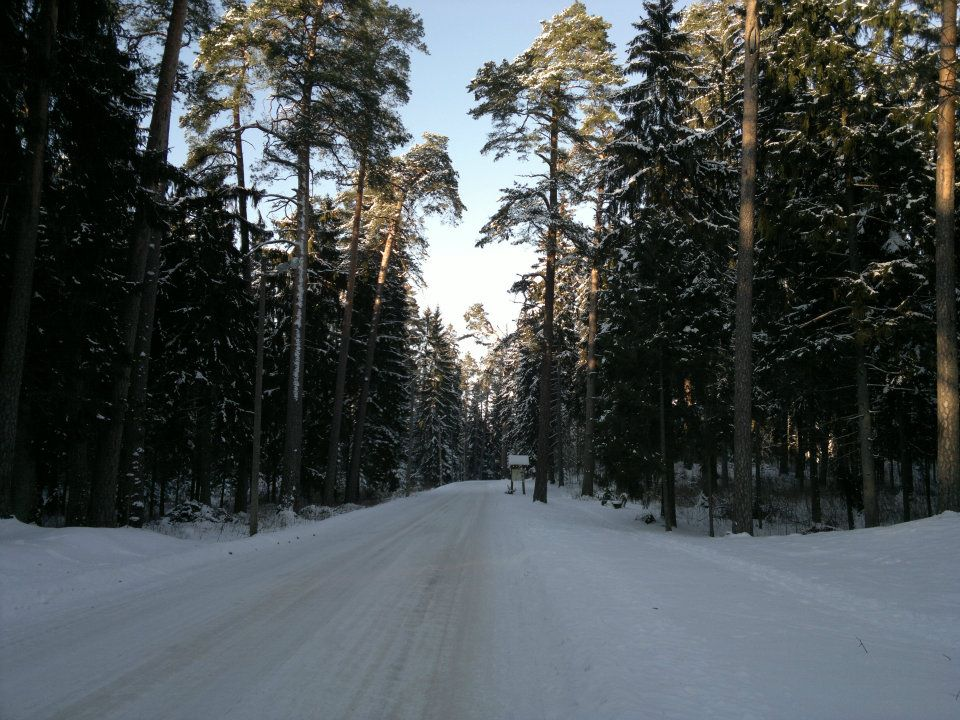
E. Damaševičiaus alley in winter

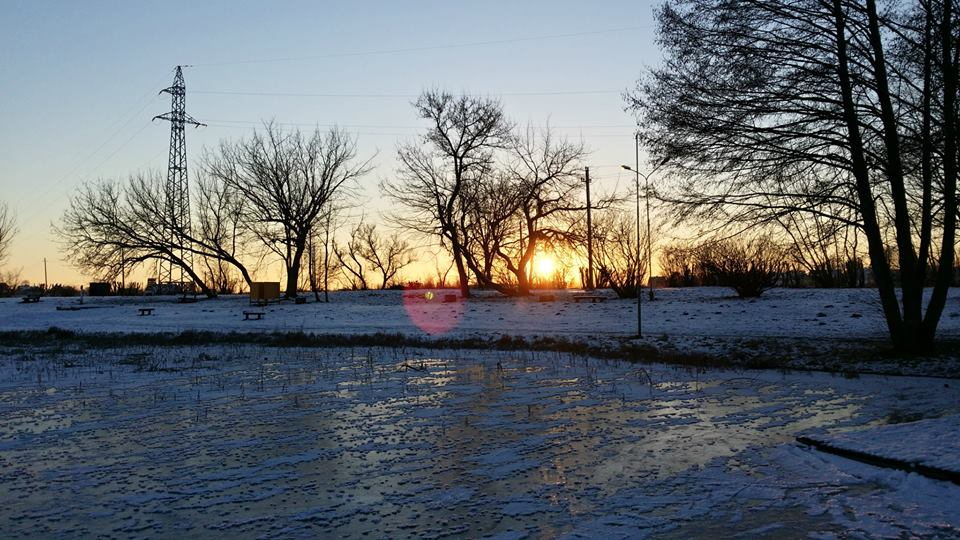
Bridvaišis lake beach in winter

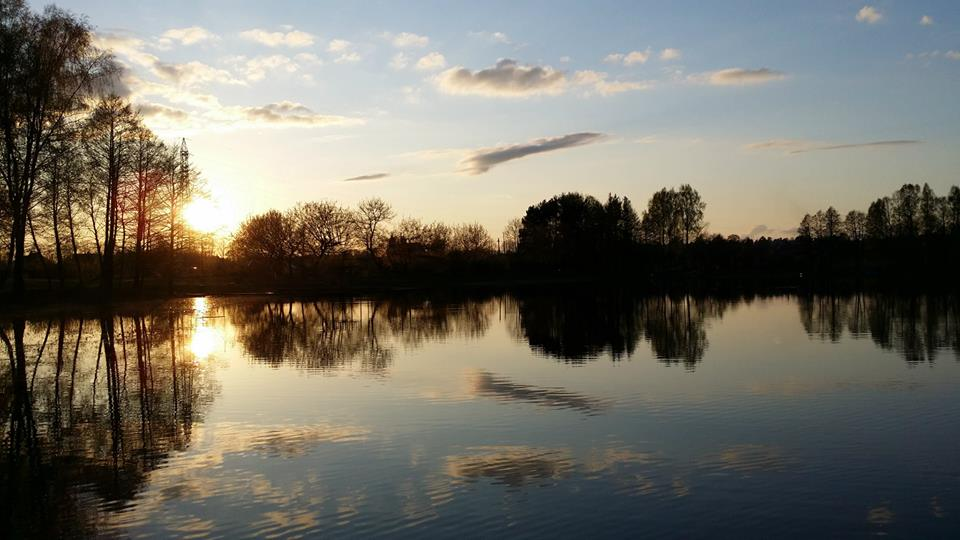
Bridvaišis lake in autumn

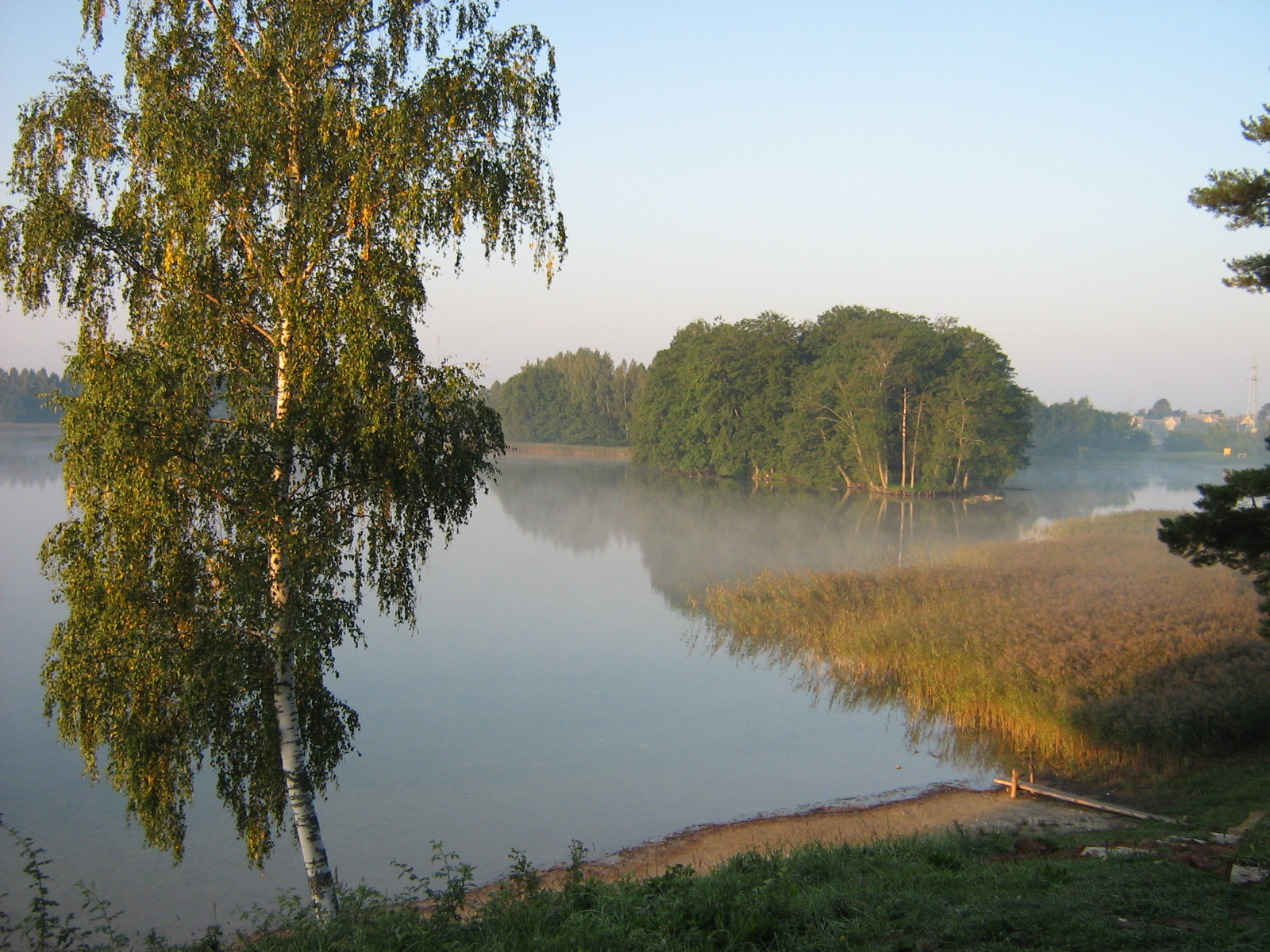
Bridvaišis lake viewed from a small castle hill

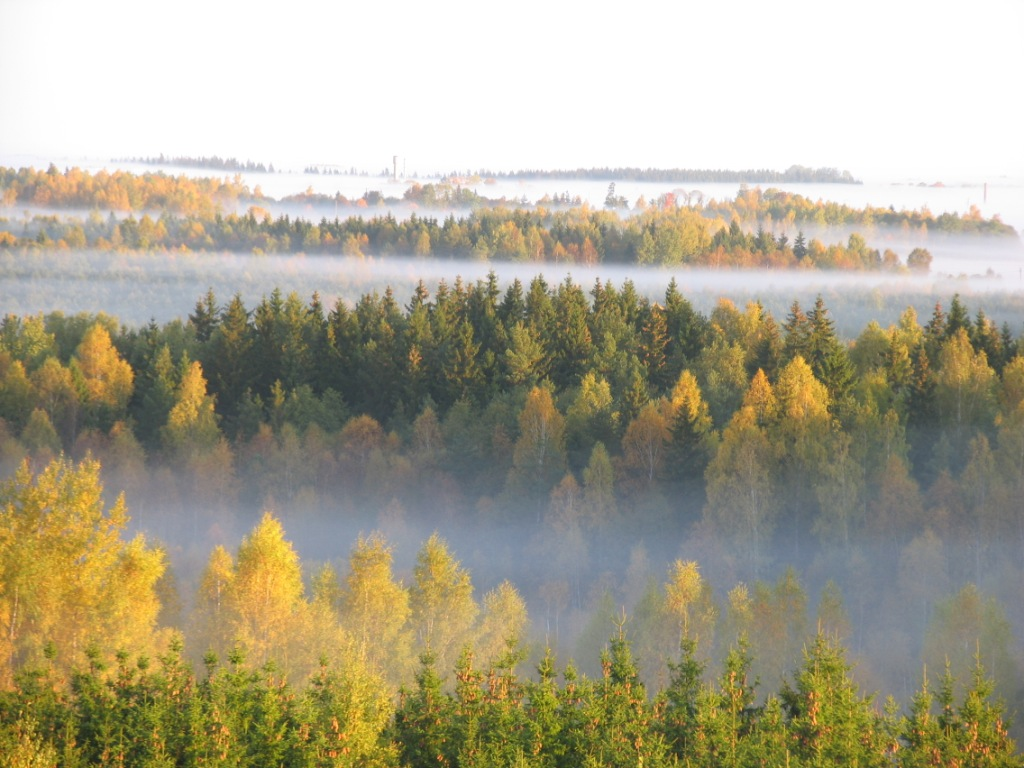
Tytuvėnai Regional Park photo taken from a watch tower

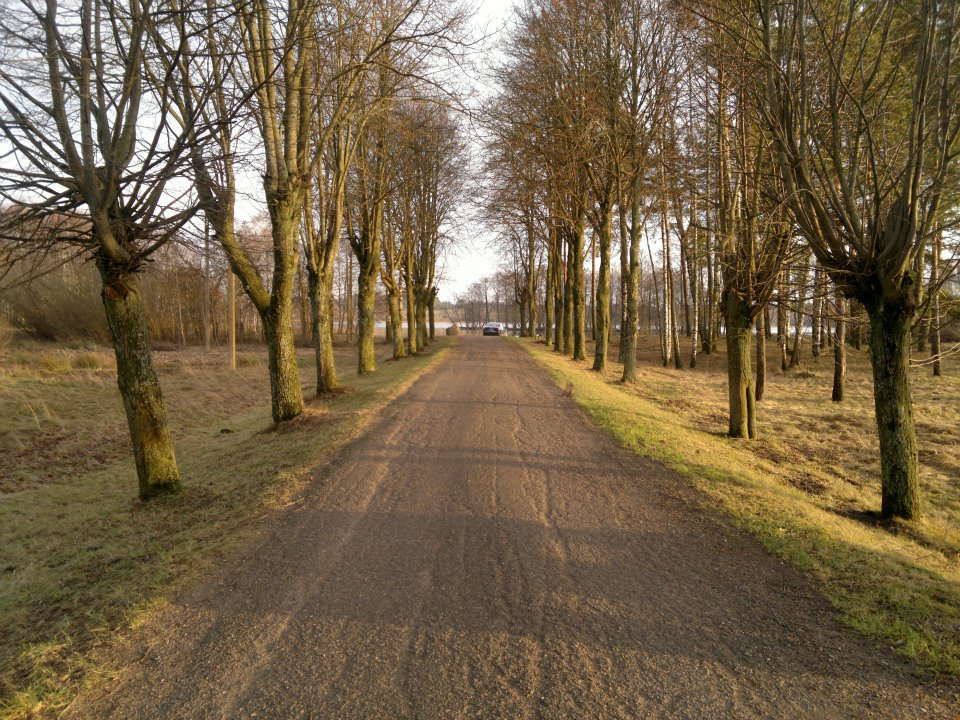
Road towards Bridvaišis lake on autumn

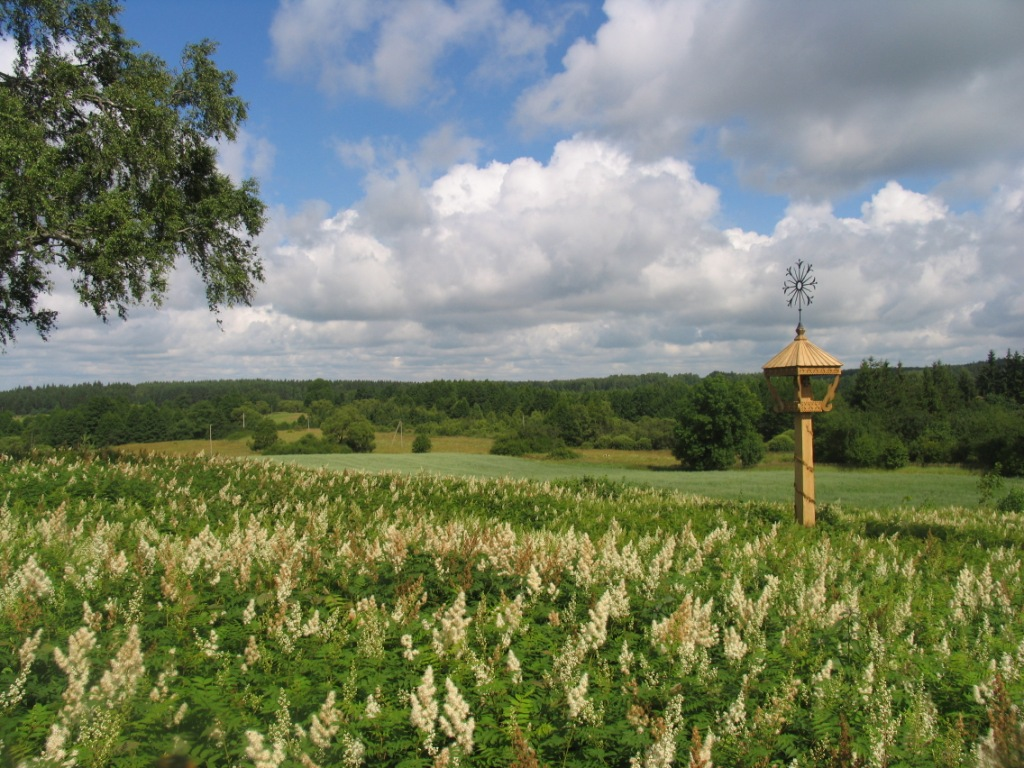
Tytuvėnai Regional Park landscape

== Cultural heritage ==
The most famous cultural object in Tytuvenai is the church and monastery architectural ensemble from the 17th century. Spacious yard, surrounded by closed Lithuanian gallery, with a chapel with steps in the center, by which those who come to pray go up. In a monastery in authentic monks’ cells many fresco paintings are made. Splendid chapel of Šiluva is built upon the project of well-known architect Antanas Vivuliškis. Here there is also an attractive old market square with several old wooden houses surrounding it. The numerous pagan memorials include Bridvaišis, Šiauleliai, Pašakarnėlis and Kudinis castle hills, Kuršis, Debeikis, Rinkšelis tumuluses (burial mounds), as well as former shrine of pagans – Saint Jurgis Hill.

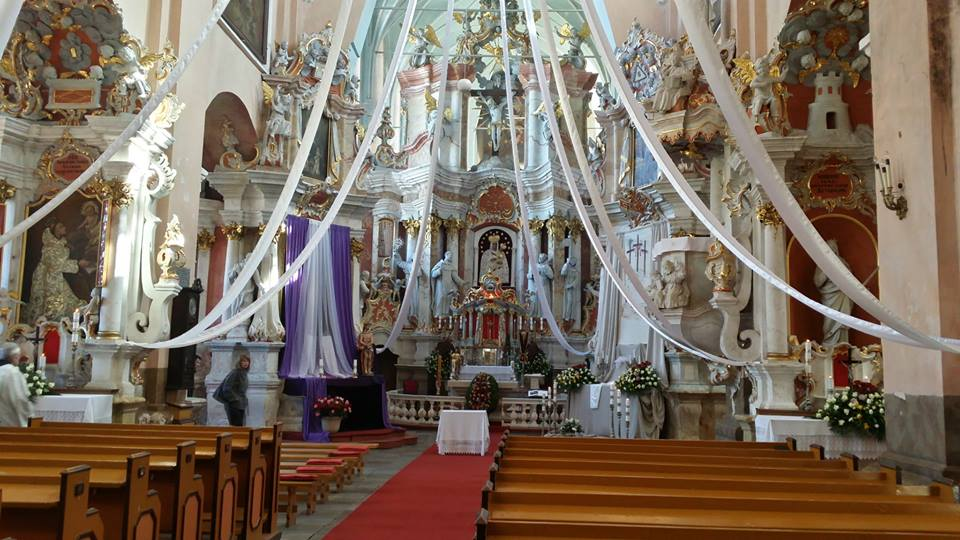
Inside of Tytuvėnai church
