= Pagėgiai Municipality =

Pagėgiai Municipality Pagėgių savivaldybė
- Municipality
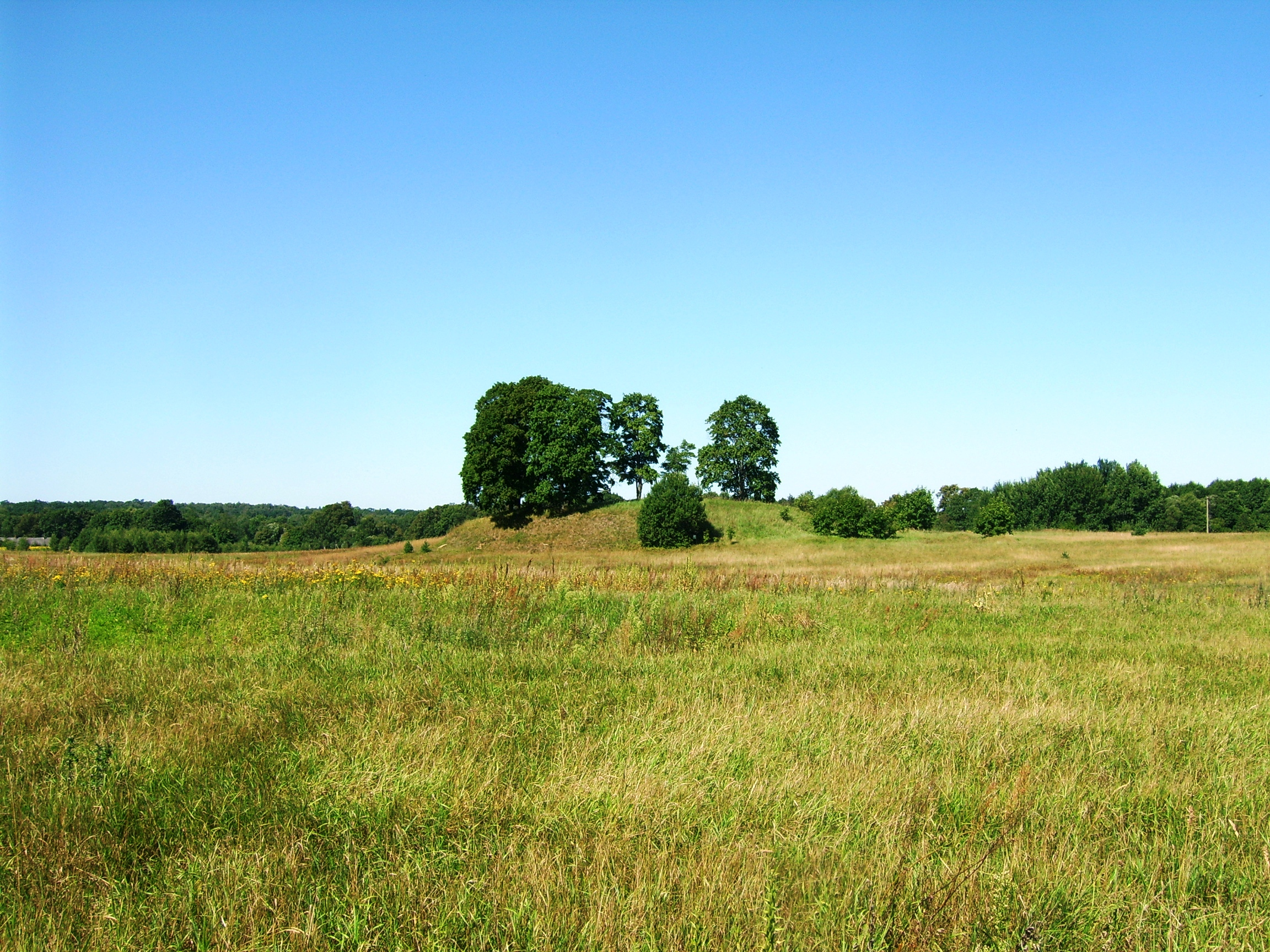
- Tumulus

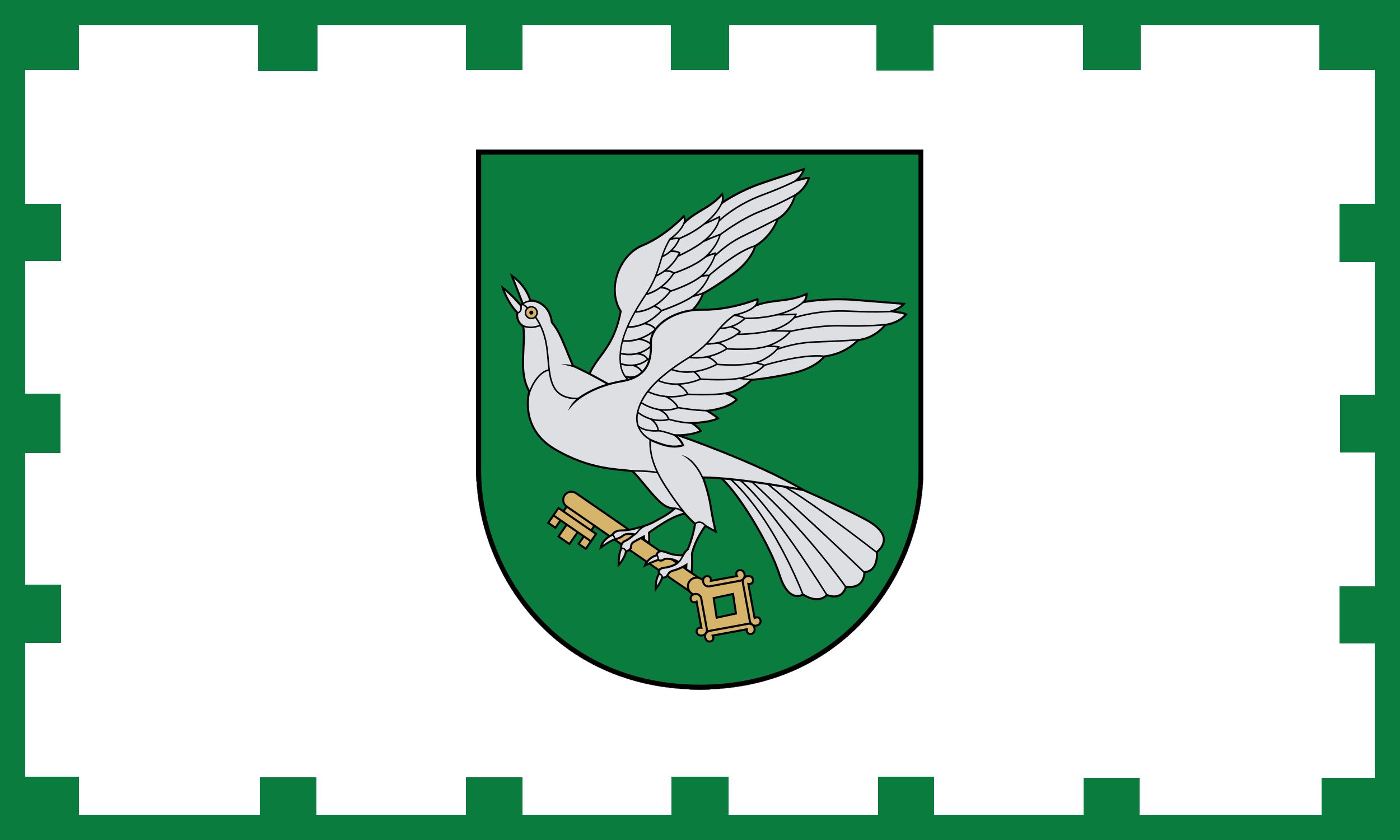
- Flag Coat of arms

- Location in Lithuania

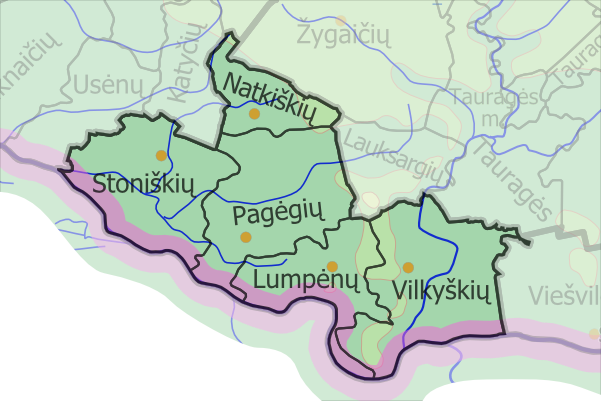
- Map of Pagėgiai municipality
- Coordinates: 55°07′52″N 21°58′26″E
- Country: Lithuania
- Ethnographic region: Lithuania Minor
- County: Tauragė
- Capital: Pagėgiai
- Elderships: 5

Area
  - Total: 537 km^{2} (207 sq mi)
  - Rank: 47th

Population (2021)
  - Total: 7,440
  - Rank: 57
  - Density: 13.9/km^{2} (35.9/sq mi)
  - Rank: 49th
- Time zone: UTC+2 (EET)
  - Summer (DST): UTC+3 (EEST)
- Telephone code: 441
- Major settlements: Pagėgiai (pop. 1,576); Panemunė (pop. 194)
- Website: www.pagegiai.lt

Pagėgiai Municipality (Lithuanian: Pagėgių savivaldybė) is a municipality in Tauragė County, Lithuania.

== Geography ==
The majority of the municipality is situated in the lower valley of the Nemunas River, except for the Vilkyškiai Ridge, which rises in the eastern part. The southern border of the area is delineated by the Nemunas River, which leaves behind numerous old riverbeds, known as meanders, and receives several tributaries. Along the banks of the Nemunas, the Rambynas hill is located. There are dense forests by Pagėgiai and Bitėnai.

== Seniūnijas ==
The Pagėgiai municipality contains 5 seniūnijas (in English: elderships or wards); the main town or village is listed for each.

1. Lumpėnai Eldership– Lumpėnai
2. Natkiškiai Eldership – Natkiškiai
3. Pagėgiai Eldership – Pagėgiai
4. Stoniškiai Eldership – Stoniškiai
5. Vilkyškiai Eldership – Vilkyškiai

== Population by locality ==
Status: M, MST - city, town / K, GST - village / VS - farmstead

2011 Census
Locality	Status	Total	Male	Female
Pagėgių mun.		9,500	4,482	5,018
Lumpėnai Eldership (seniūnija)		1,040	508	532
Bardinai	K	112	54	58
Bitėnai	K	76	38	38
Kerkutviečiai	K	49	22	27
Krakeniškiai	K	2	1	1
Lumpėnai	K	533	256	277
Nepertlaukiai	K	12	7	5
Palumpiai	K	52	27	25
Pempynė	K	21	10	11
Sodėnai	K	2	1	1
Strazdai	K	14	7	7
Strazdeliai	K	7	4	3
Šakininkai	K	89	44	45
Trakininkai	K	71	37	34
Natkiškiai Eldership (seniūnija)		824	402	422
Daubarai	K	44	21	23
Endrikaičiai	VS	0	0	0
Gailiškiai	VS	0	0	0
Giegždai	K	5	3	2
Kiūpeliai	K	5	4	1
Kuturiai	K	0	0	0
Minjotai	K	31	14	17
Natkiškiai	K	580	278	302
Pėteraičiai	K	35	16	19
Ropkojai	K	55	29	26
Šauliai	VS	8	2	6
Skrodliai	VS	0	0	0
Smukutė	K	7	3	4
Šlepai	K	34	23	11
Tamošaičiai	K	10	4	6
Timsriai	K	8	4	4
Žemučiai	K	2	1	1
Pagėgiai Eldership (seniūnija)		4,067	1,888	2,179
Bajėnai	K	30	18	12
Benininkai	K	367	176	191
Birštoniškiai	K	34	17	17
Būbliškė	K	177	89	88
Eisraviškiai	K	30	14	16
Endriškiai	K	13	6	7
Geniai	K	35	16	19
Grigolaičiai	K	21	10	11
Gudai	K	103	47	56
Jonikaičiai	K	65	35	30
Kentriai	K	182	93	89
Kulmenai	K	25	12	13
Mantvilaičiai	K	9	4	5
Mikytai	K	26	9	17
Pagėgiai	K	63	28	35
Pagėgiai	M	1,941	852	1,089
Panemunė	M	274	126	148
Pavilkiai	K	46	20	26
Piktupėnai	K	366	187	179
Plaušvariai	K	21	10	11
Strepeikiai	K	50	25	25
Sūdėnai	K	0	0	0
Užbaliai	K	10	6	4
Vėlaičiai	K	35	19	16
Vidgiriai	K	109	54	55
Vydutaičiai	K	35	15	20
Stoniškiai Eldership(seniūnija)		2,019	963	1,056
Aleknai	K	30	13	17
Anužiai	K	110	52	58
Berštininkai	K	36	19	17
Dinkiai	K	0	0	0
Karceviškiai	K	0	0	0
Kovgiriai	K	12	5	7
Kuciai	K	28	14	14
Lazdėnai	K	4	2	2
Mažaičiai	K	204	97	107
Naujapieviai	K	9	3	6
Nausėdai	K	5	3	2
Pageldyniai	K	13	6	7
Pakamoniai	K	86	42	44
Peleniai	K	3	1	2
Plaškiai	K	112	53	59
Pleinė	K	8	3	5
Rėžiai	K	10	6	4
Rukai	K	600	282	318
Spengiai	K	22	6	16
Stoniškiai	K	178	86	92
Stumbragiriai	K	43	22	21
Šilgaliai	K	491	242	249
Šuneliai	K	13	5	8
Tutliai	K	0	0	0
Vičiai	K	2	1	1
Vilkyškiai Eldership (seniūnija)		1,550	721	829
Adomiškiai	K	15	7	8
Aušgiriai	K	46	23	23
Baltupėnai	K	6	4	2
Barzūnai	K	33	17	16
Kalvaičiai	K	0	0	0
Keleriškiai	K	9	3	6
Kriokiškiai	K	103	48	55
Lindikai	K	6	3	3
Mažrimaičiai	K	35	17	18
Mociškiai	K	45	21	24
Naujininkai	K	11	6	5
Nausėdai	K	20	6	14
Opstainėliai	K	0	0	0
Opstainys	K	54	21	33
Pagenaičiai	K	29	18	11
Raudondvaris	K	0	0	0
Sokaičiai	K	24	12	12
Stygliškiai	K	37	21	16
Šereitlaukis	K	36	16	20
Vartūliškiai	K	46	23	23
Vėžininkai	K	67	33	34
Vilkyškiai	MST	666	294	372
Žagmantai	K	5	3	2
Žagmantėliai	K	0	0	0
Žukai	K	257	125	132
