= Dieveniškės Regional Park =

Coordinates: 54°14′N 25°39′E

Dieveniškės Regional Park, established in 1992, covers 11,000 hectares (27,000 acres; 42 sq mi) in southeastern Lithuania near the city of Šalčininkai. Its natural and cultural features include Bėčionys castle mound, the Norviliškės monastery complex, and geologic formations. Much of the village of Dieveniškės lies within its territory.
