= Stonys =

Stonys is the masculine form of a Lithuanian family name. Its feminine forms are: Stonienė (married woman or widow) and Stonytė (unmarried woman).

The surname may refer to:

- Audrius Stonys (born 1966), Lithuanian film director
- Modestas Stonys (born 1980), Lithuanian footballer
- Sigutė Stonytė (born 1955), Lithuanian opera singer
