= Aukštadvaris Regional Park =

Coordinates: 54.57°N 24.59°E

- IUCN category V (protected landscape/seascape)
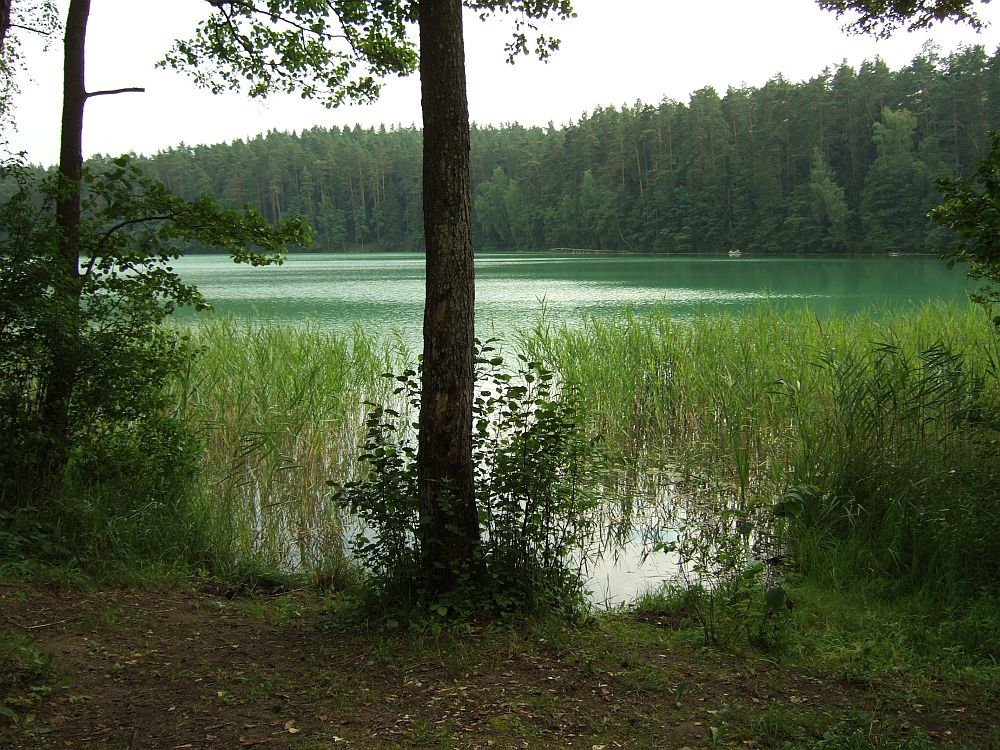
- Lake Spindžius in Aukštadvaris Regional Park
- Location: Vilnius County, Lithuania
- Nearest city: Trakai
- Area: 17,005 ha (42,020 acres)
- Established: 1992
- Website: www.arp.lt

Aukštadvaris Regional Park, established in 1992, covers 17,240 hectares in southeastern Lithuania near the town of Aukštadvaris.

The park contains about 80 lakes, burial grounds, villages, and designated recreational areas. Among its cultural landmarks is an oak dedicated to the poet Adam Mickiewicz.
