= Vilkyškiai =

- Town
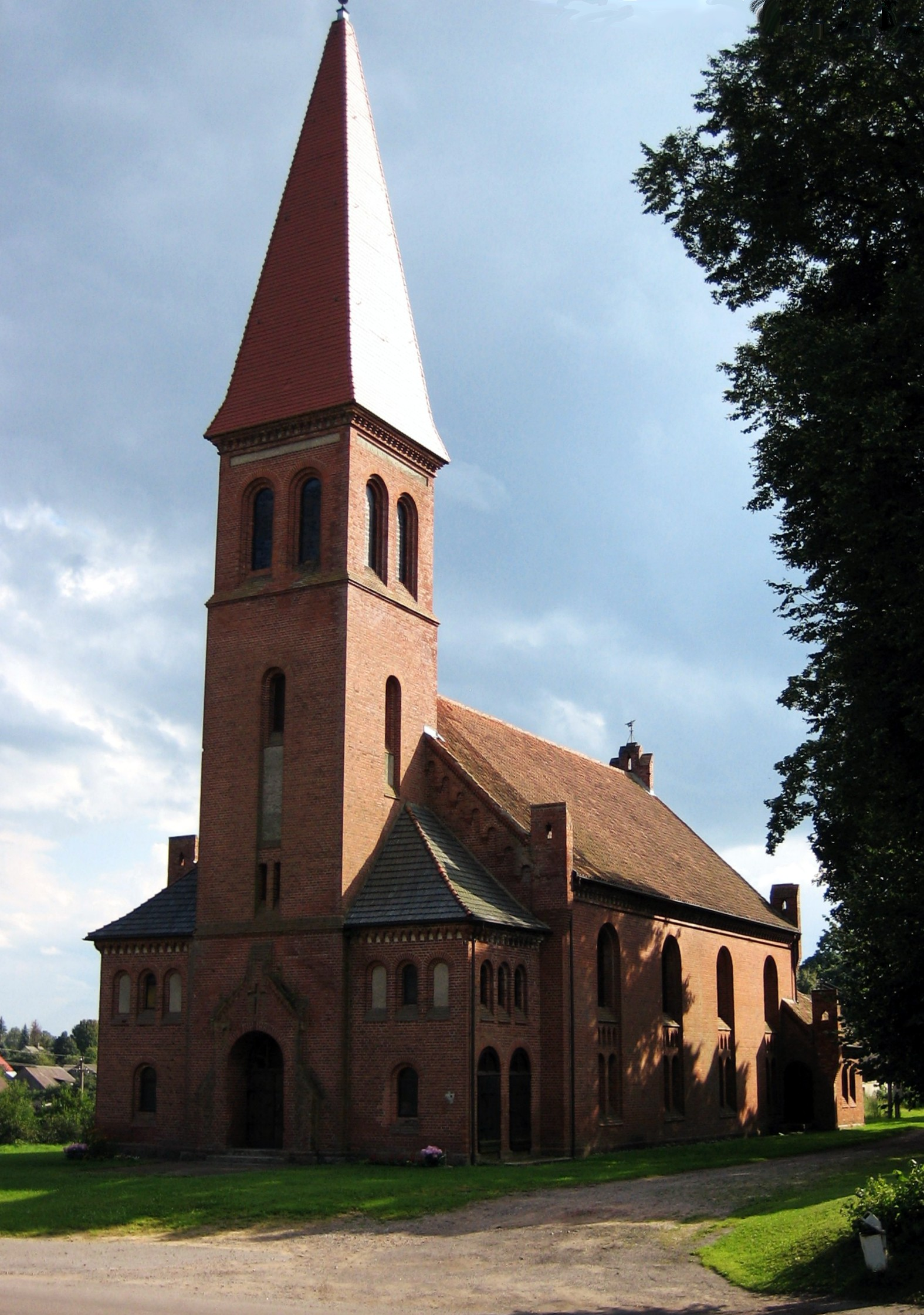

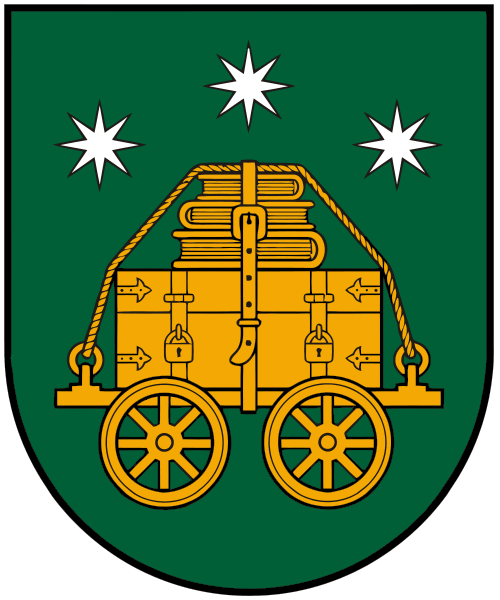
- Seal

- Location within Lithuania
- Coordinates: 55°07′10″N 22°07′50″E
- Country: Lithuania
- County: Tauragė County

Population (2021)
  - Total: 524
- Time zone: UTC+2 (EET)
  - Summer (DST): UTC+3 (EEST)

Vilkyškiai (German: Willkischken) is a small town in Tauragė County, in western Lithuania. According to the 2011 census, the town has a population of 666 people.

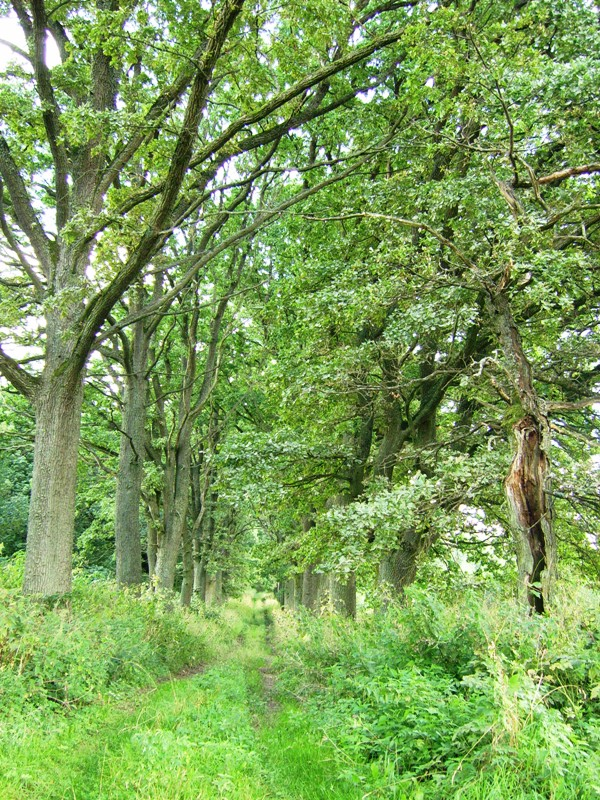
Oak alley

== Etymology ==
It is believed that the name of the town was previously longer – Vilkijiškiai. This is a place name, which probably originated from the neuter gender Vilkija of the name of the river Vilka (or Vilkė). Theoretically, it is also possible that the first inhabitants of Vilkyškiai originated from the settlement of Vilkija. The normative gender with the suffix -yšk was approved in 1997.

== Geography ==
The town is part of the Rambynas Regional Park territory, located in the Vilkyškių Ridge (60–80 m above sea level in the middle). The Jūra River flows in the east, and a small forest stretches in the southeast.

== Notable people ==
- Albrecht Gustav von Manstein (1805–1877), German general
- Jonas Urbonas (1807–1886), participant in the Lithuanian literary movement, translator, publicist, taught at the Vilkyškės school
- Jurgis Gerulis (1888–1945), linguist, and Balticist.
- Oskar Brüsewitz (1929–1976), East German Lutheran pastor
