= Lithuania Minor =

Lithuanian ethnographic region in former Prussia

Lithuania Minor Mažoji Lietuva
- Ethnographic region of Lithuania
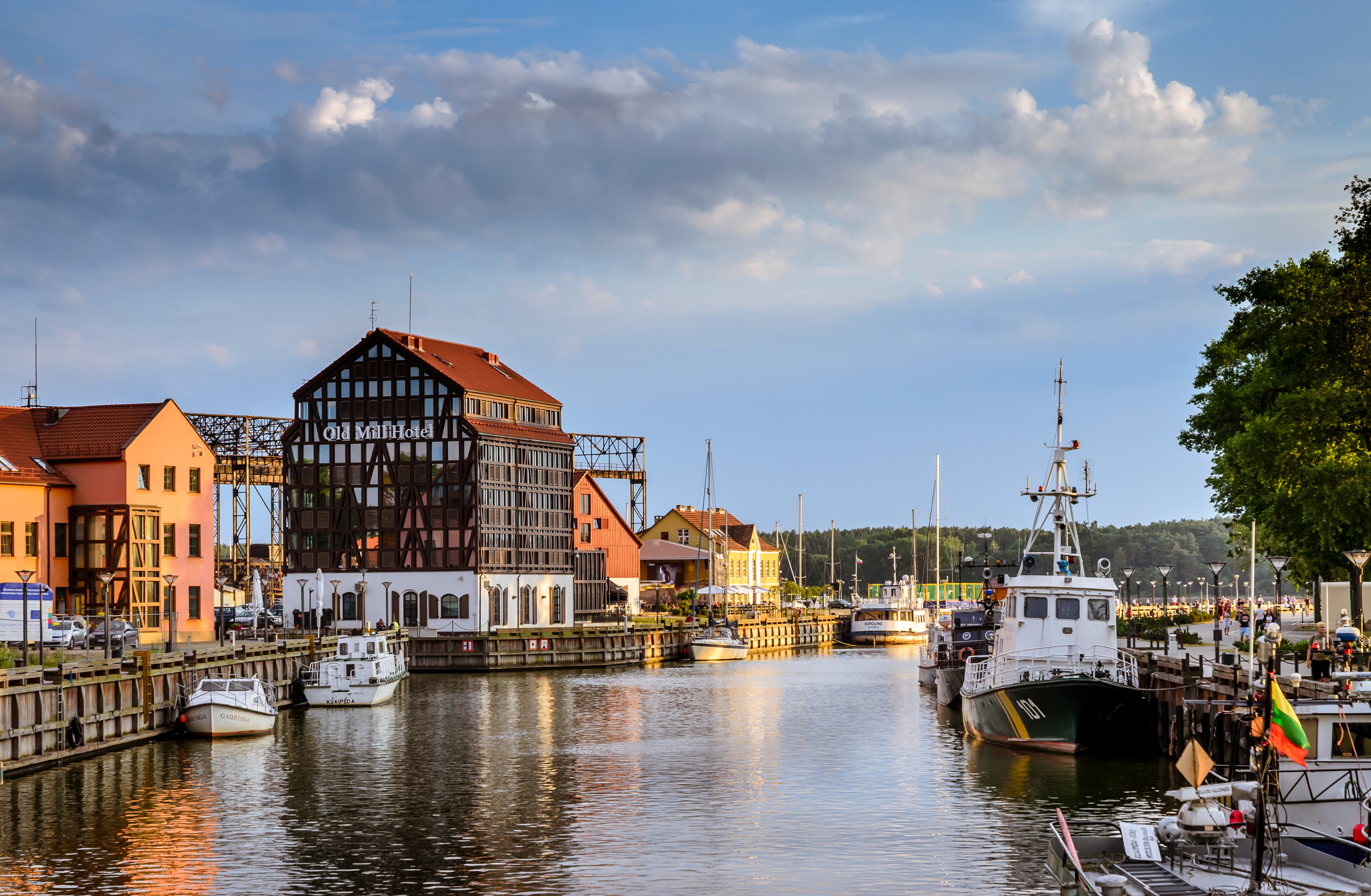
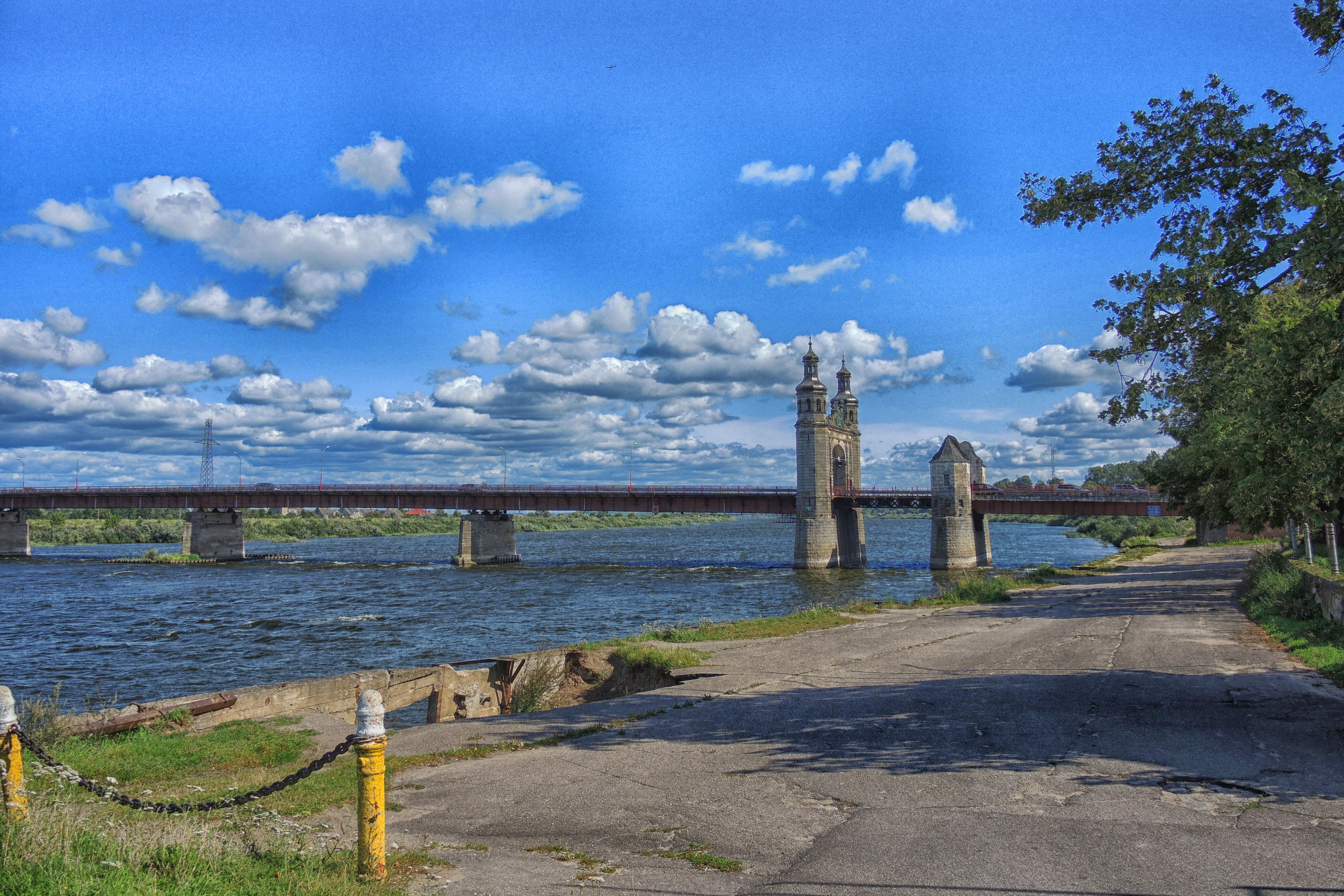
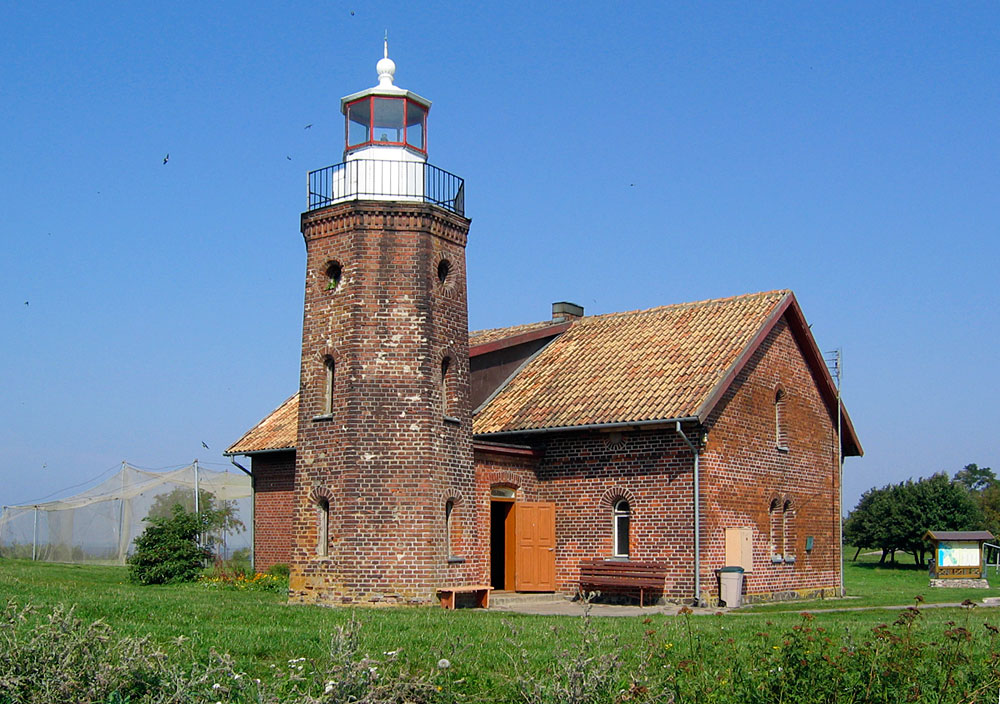
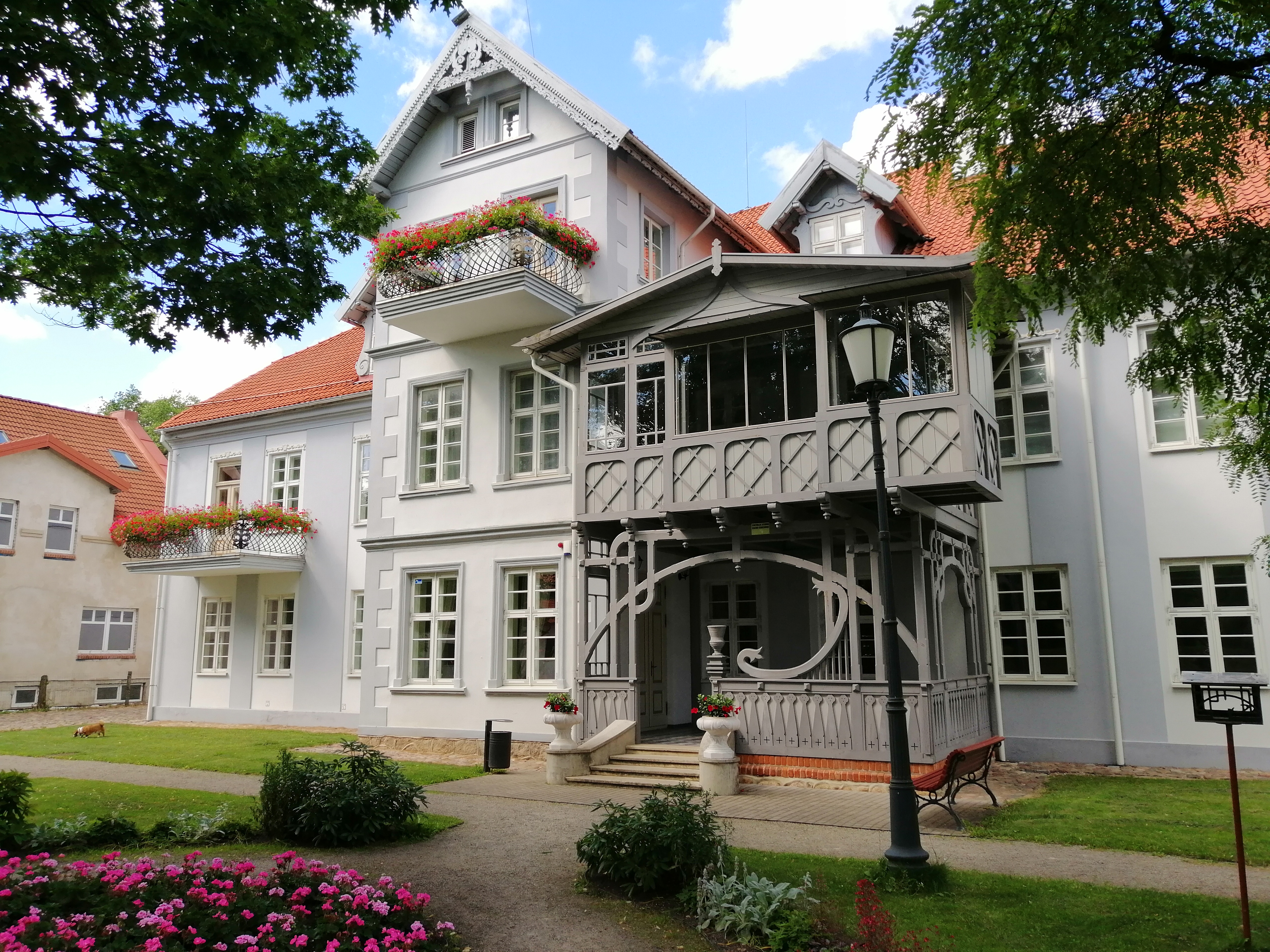
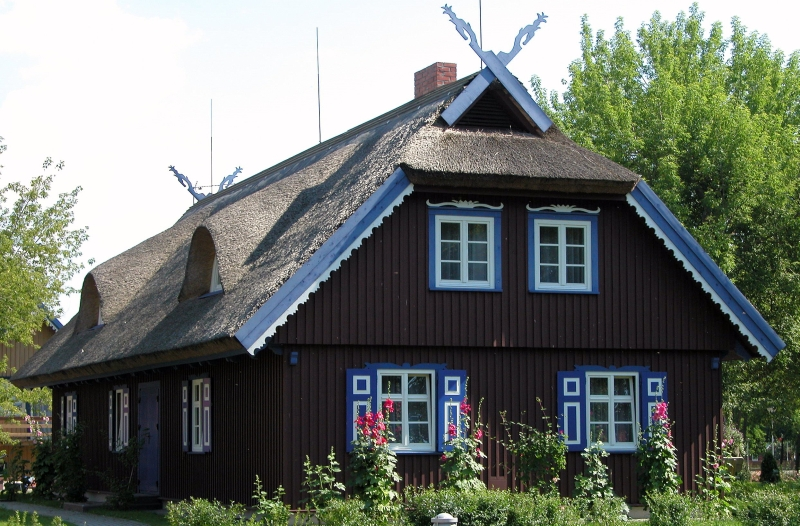
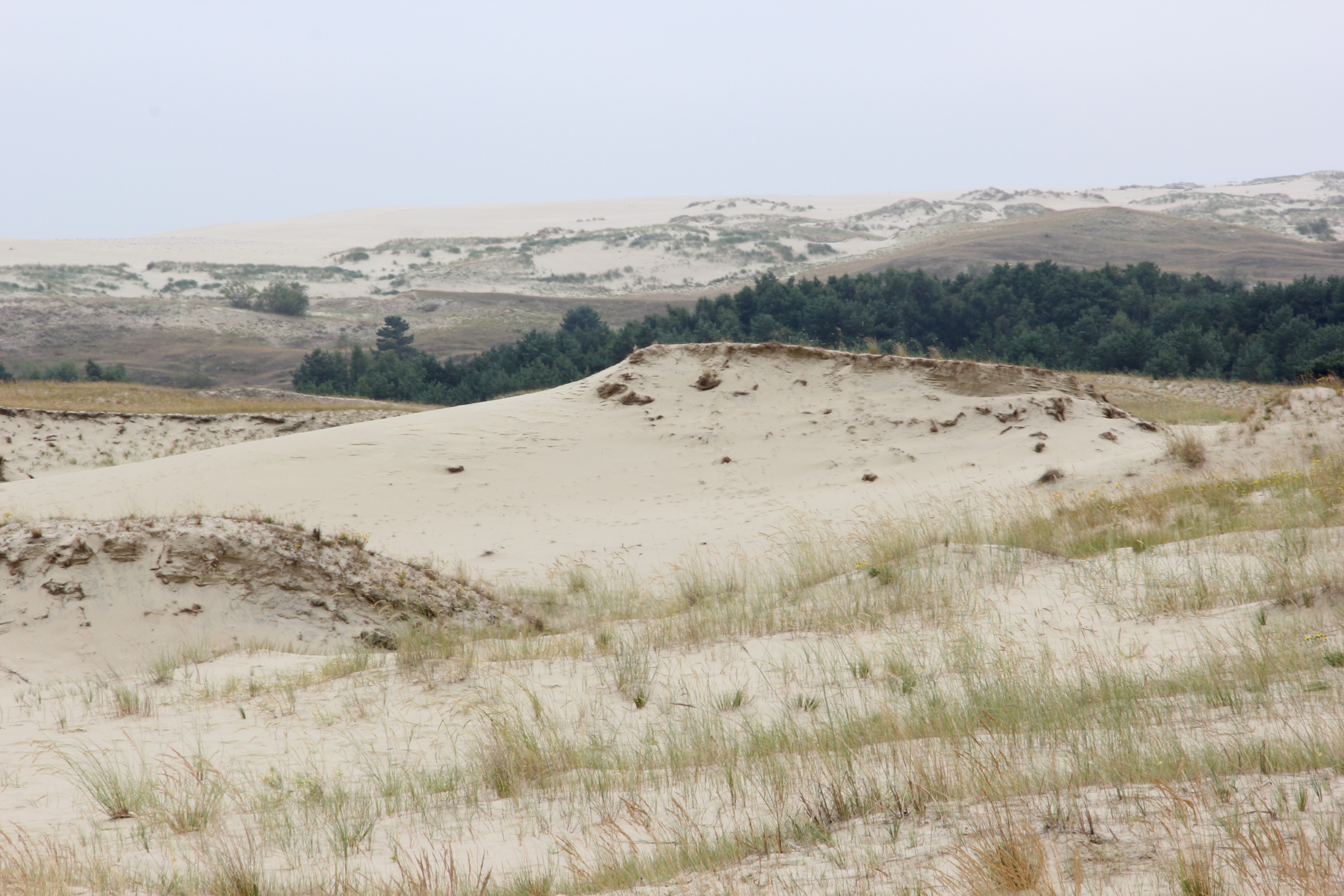
- Port of Klaipėda Queen Louise Bridge between Panemunė and Sovetsk Ventė Cape lighthouse Old manor in Šilutė Traditional fisherman houses in Nida Curonian Spit National Park

- Flag Coat of arms

- Location of part of Lithuania Minor within modern Lithuania
- Countries: Lithuania, Russia
- Capital: Šilutė
- Largest city: Klaipėda

Area
  - Total: 2,848 km^{2} (1,100 sq mi)
- area on the right-bank of the Neman river (Klaipėda Region), excluding Kaliningrad Oblast side

Population (1925)
  - Total: 141,650
  - Density: 49.74/km^{2} (128.8/sq mi)
- population on the right-bank of the Neman river (Klaipėda Region), excluding Kaliningrad Oblast side
- Demonyms: Prussian Lithuanian (English); lietuvininkas (masc) and lietuvininkė (fem) (Lithuanian)
- Time zone: UTC2 (CET (GMT +2))

Lithuania Minor (Note: Lithuanian: Mažoji Lietuva; Russian: Малая Литва́; Polish: Litwa Mniejsza; German: Kleinlitauen.) or Prussian Lithuania (Note: Lithuanian: Prūsų Lietuva; Russian: Пру́сская Литва́; Polish: Litwa Pruska; German: Preußisch-Litauen.) is a historical region divided between Lithuania and the Kaliningrad Oblast of Russia, and one of five ethnographic regions of Lithuania. It is a subregion of Prussia, where Prussian Lithuanians (or Lietuvininkai) lived, and got its name from the territory's substantial Lithuanian-speaking population.

Prior to the invasion of the Teutonic Knights in the 13th century, the main part of the territory later known as Lithuania Minor was inhabited by the tribes of Skalvians and Nadruvians. The land depopulated during the incessant war between Lithuania and the Teutonic Order. The war ended with the Treaty of Melno and the land was repopulated by Lithuanian newcomers, returning refugees, and the remaining indigenous Baltic peoples; the term Lithuania Minor appeared for the first time between 1517 and 1526.

With the exception of the Klaipėda Region, which became a mandated territory of the League of Nations in 1920 by the Treaty of Versailles and was unified with Lithuania from 1923 to 1939, the area was part of the state of Prussia until 1945, which was fief of the Kingdom of Poland until 1657 and later developed into the Kingdom of Prussia, from 1871 within the German Reich. Since 1945, a small portion of Lithuania Minor has been retained within the borders of modern-day Lithuania and Poland while most of the territory is part of the Kaliningrad Oblast of Russia, which was part of the Soviet Union until December 1991.

Although hardly anything remains of the original Lithuanian culture of the area due to the Germanisation policies of the German Empire in the late 19th and early 20th centuries, Lithuania Minor has contributed significantly to Lithuanian culture overall. The standard written form of Prussian-Lithuanian provided the basis for modern Lithuanian, evolved from people close to Stanislovas Rapalionis and graduates from Lithuanian-language schools established in Vilnius, who were expelled from the Grand Duchy during Counter-Reformation years. Those include notable names like Abraomas Kulvietis and Martynas Mažvydas. During the years of the 19th-century Lithuanian press ban, most of the Lithuanian books printed using the Latin alphabet were published in Lithuania Minor.

== Terminology ==
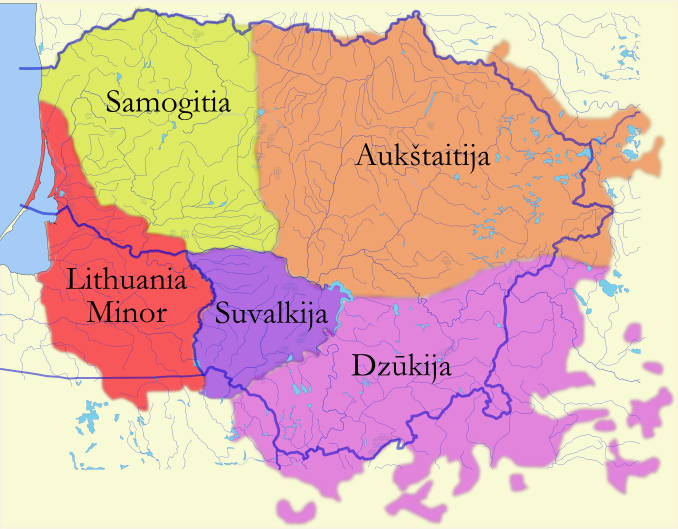
Lithuania Minor and the other historical ethnographic regions of Lithuania

The term "Lithuania Minor" refers to the northernmost part of the former province of East Prussia (about 31,500 km^{2} or 12,200 sq mi). It was first mentioned as Kleinlittaw in Simon Grunau's Prussian Chronicle of the early 16th century (between 1517 and 1526) and was later repeated by another Prussian chronicler, Lucas David. The term Lithuania Minor was first applied during the 19th century and used more widely during the 20th century, mostly among historians and ethnographers.

The northeastern limit of the area of Prussia inhabited by Lithuanians was the state border between Lithuania and Prussia, and the northern border was along the Neman river, but the southwestern limit was not clear. Thus, the territory of Lithuania Minor has been understood differently by different parties; it could be:

- either the area limited in the south by Max Toeppen – Adalbert Bezzenberger's line (about 11,400 km^{2} or 4,400 sq mi) what is roughly the area of the former administrative Lithuania Province (about 10,000 km^{2} or 4,000 sq mi), where the population was almost entirely Lithuanian until 1709–1711,
- or the area of the former region with actual Lithuanian majority or of considerable percentage (about 17–18,000 km^{2} or 6,500–7,000 sq mi).

The administrative terms "Lithuanian province" (Provinz Litthauen), "Lithuanian districts" (Littauische Ämter), "Lithuanian county" (Littauischer Kreis) or simply "Prussian Lithuania" (Preußisch Litauen), "Lithuania" (Litauen) were used to refer to the Lithuanian inhabited administrative units (Nadruvia and Scalovia) in the legal documentation of Prussian state since 1618. The Lithuanian Province was named Klein Litau, Klein Litauen, Preussisch Litthauen, Little Lithuania, Litvania in the maps of Prussia since 1738. The official use of the concepts Prussian Lithuania etc. decreased considerably from the administrative reform of 1815–1818.

== Geography ==
Physical map of Lithuania Minor in 1905

The area of Lithuania Minor embraced the land between the lower reaches of the river Dangė to the north and the major headstreams of the river Pregolya (Lithuanian: Prieglius) to the south. The southwestern line ran from the Curonian Lagoon along the Deimena river to its south, continued along the Prieglius river to the Łyna (Lithuanian: Alna) river, up to the town of Alna (modern Druzhba) and hence southward along the Ašvinė river to Lake Ašvinis and from there eastward to the border of Lithuania Major. The region embraced about 11 400 km^{2}. The broader understanding of Lithuania Minor includes the area west from the Łyna and south form the lower reaches of the Prieglius and the Sambian Peninsula, making up 17–18 thousand km^{2} in total.

The former ethnic region of Lithuania Minor belongs to different states today. The part of Kaliningrad Oblast (excluding the city of Kaliningrad and its surroundings), a few territories in Poland's Warmian-Masurian Voivodeship, as well as the following territories in modern-day Lithuania: the Klaipėda district municipality, the Šilutė district municipality, Klaipėda city, Pagėgiai municipality, and Neringa municipality had once ethnically, linguistically and culturally been the latter Lithuanian region. Although now divided among countries, Lithuania Minor had been intact formerly, all these areas were once part of Prussia and thus politically separated from Lithuania Major.

From 1773 to 1918, all of Lithuania Minor was part of the Kingdom of Prussia's province of East Prussia, the core of medieval Prussia. It was a region outside of the former Lithuanian state, inhabited by a large number of Prussian Lithuanians. Ethnic Prussian Lithuanians were mostly Protestants, in contrast to the inhabitants of Lithuania Major, who predominantly were Roman Catholics.

=== Cities and towns ===
The largest, oldest and historically most important cities are Klaipėda, Sovetsk and Chernyakhovsk.

Cities and towns in the Lithuanian part:

- Katyčiai
- Kintai
- Klaipėda
- Kretingalė
- Neringa
- Pagėgiai
- Panemunė
- Plikiai
- Priekulė
- Rusnė
- Šilutė
- Smalininkai
- Viešvilė
- Vilkyškiai

Cities and towns in the Russian part:

- Chernyakhovsk
- Chernyshevskoye
- Dobrovolsk
- Gusev
- Krasnoznamensk
- Kutuzovo
- Neman
- Nesterov
- Ozyorsk
- Polessk
- Slavsk
- Sovetsk

Largest cities of Lithuania Minor

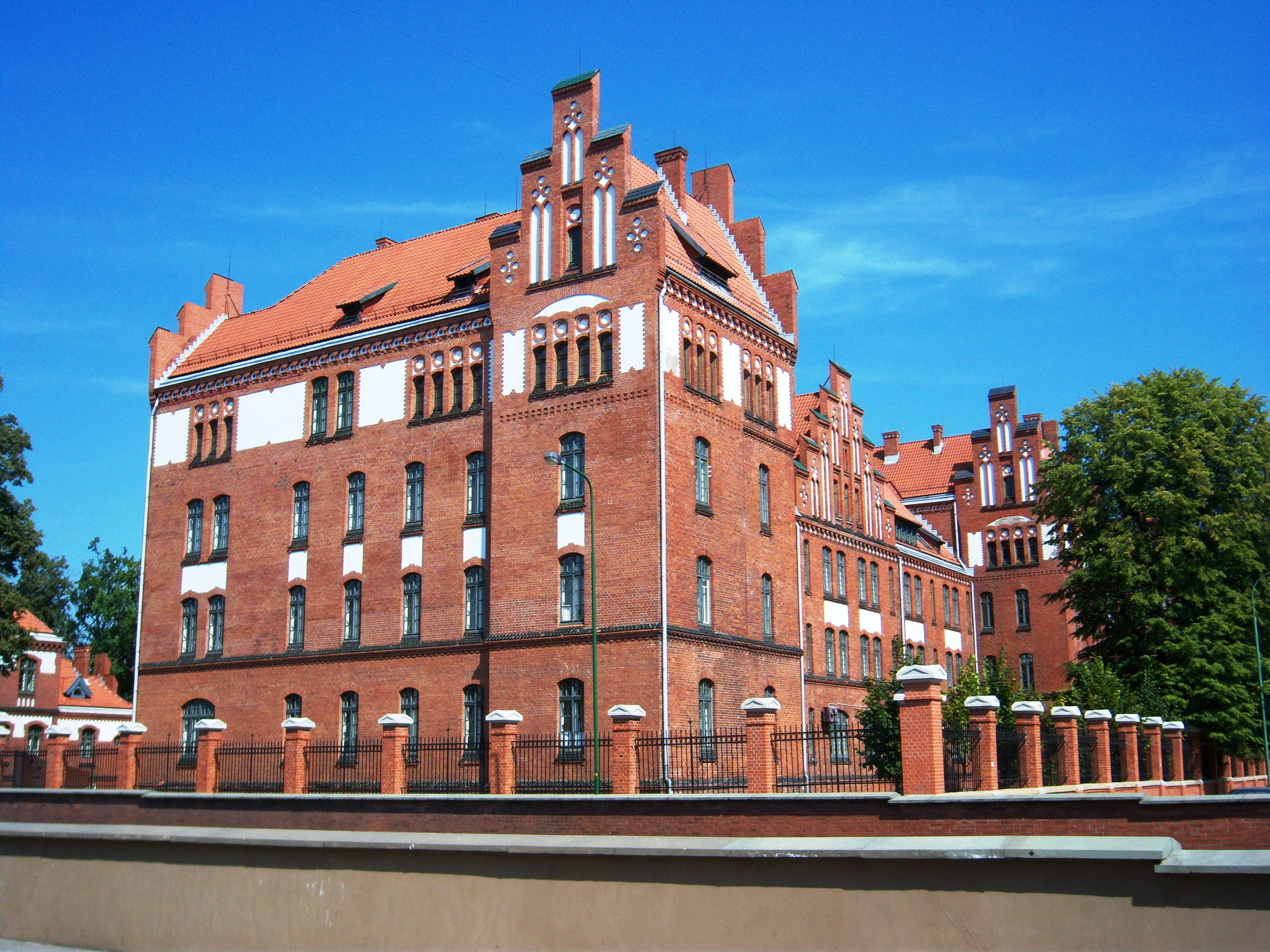
1. Klaipėda

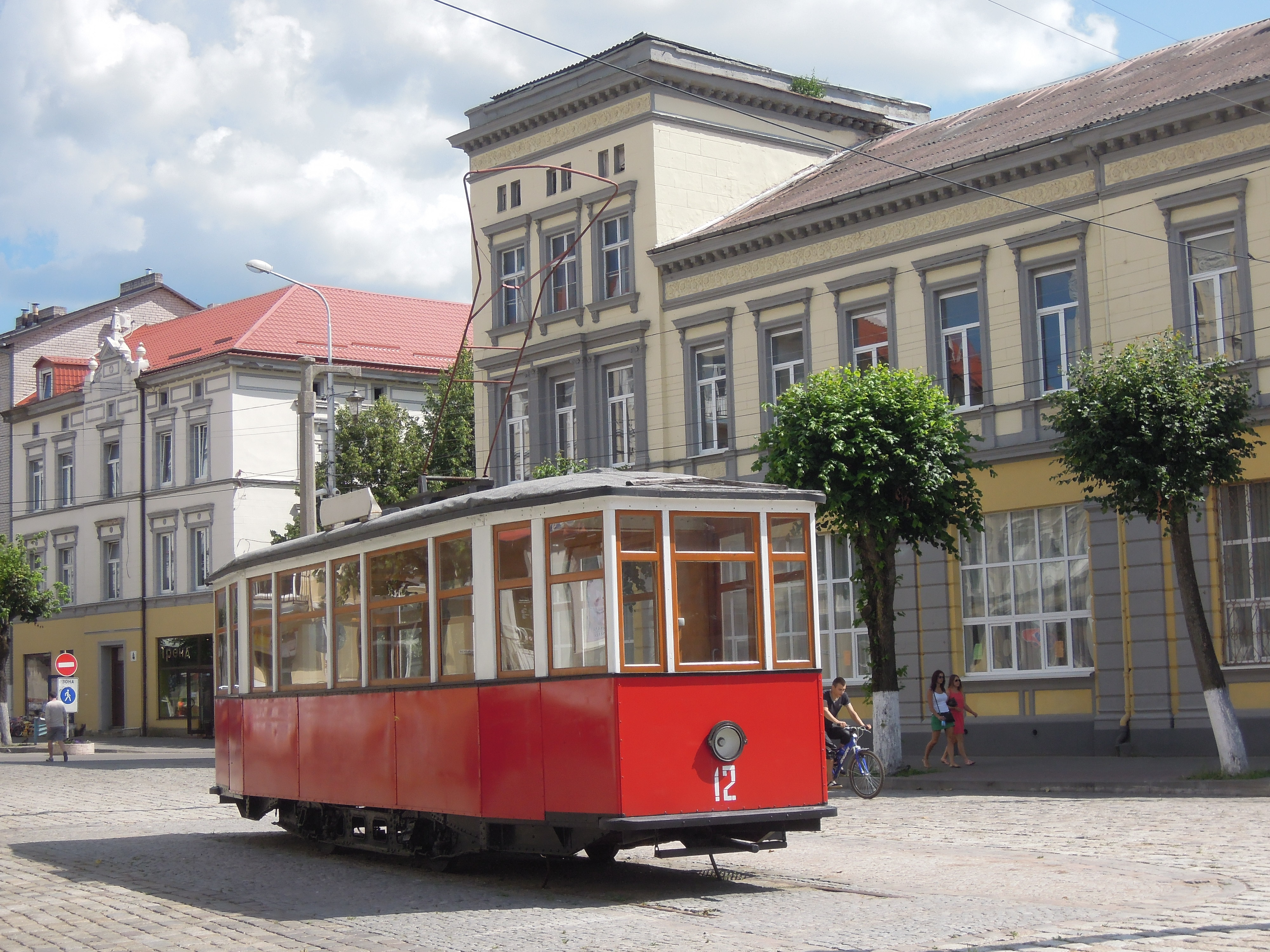
2. Sovetsk

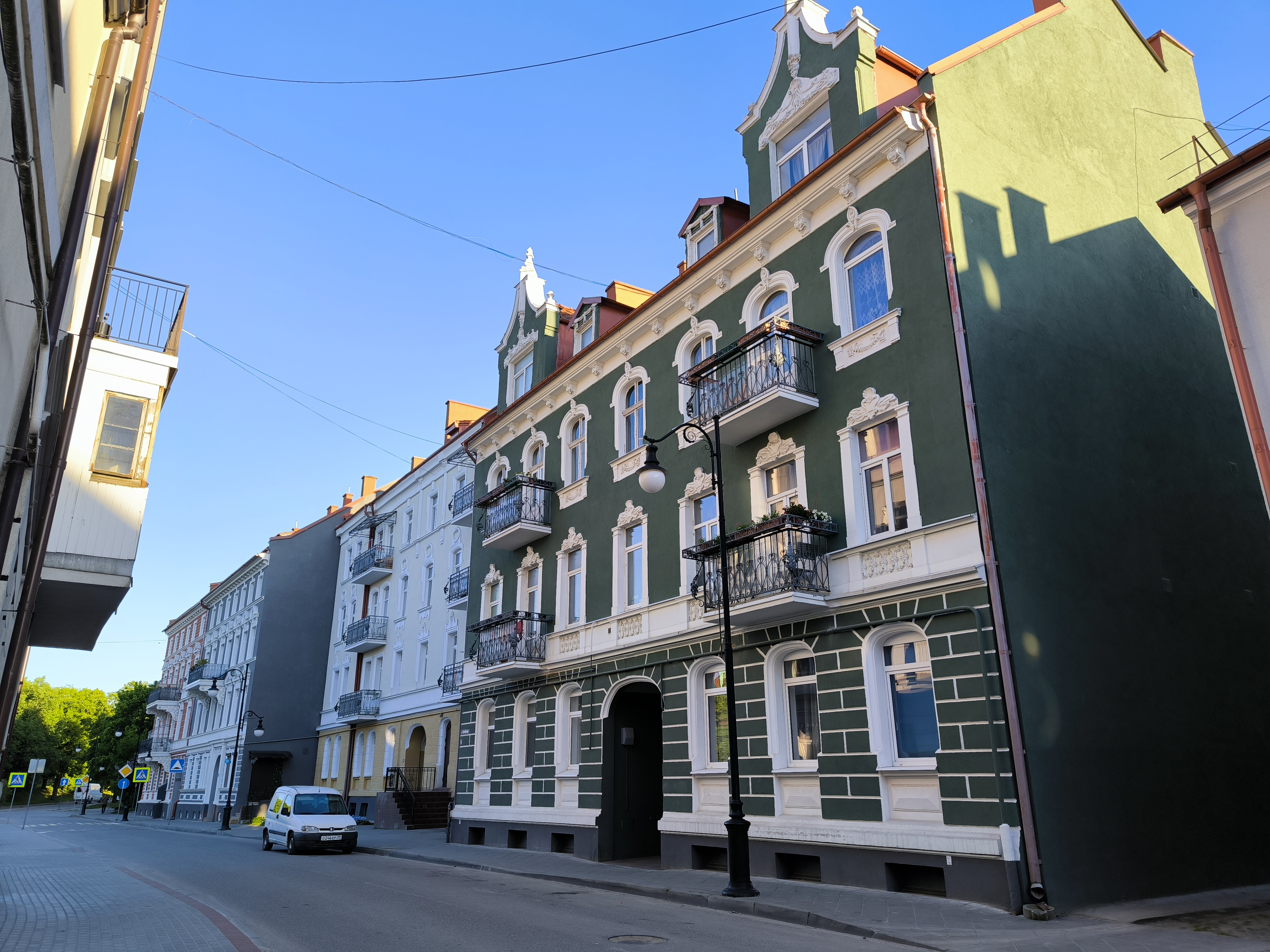
3. Chernyakhovsk

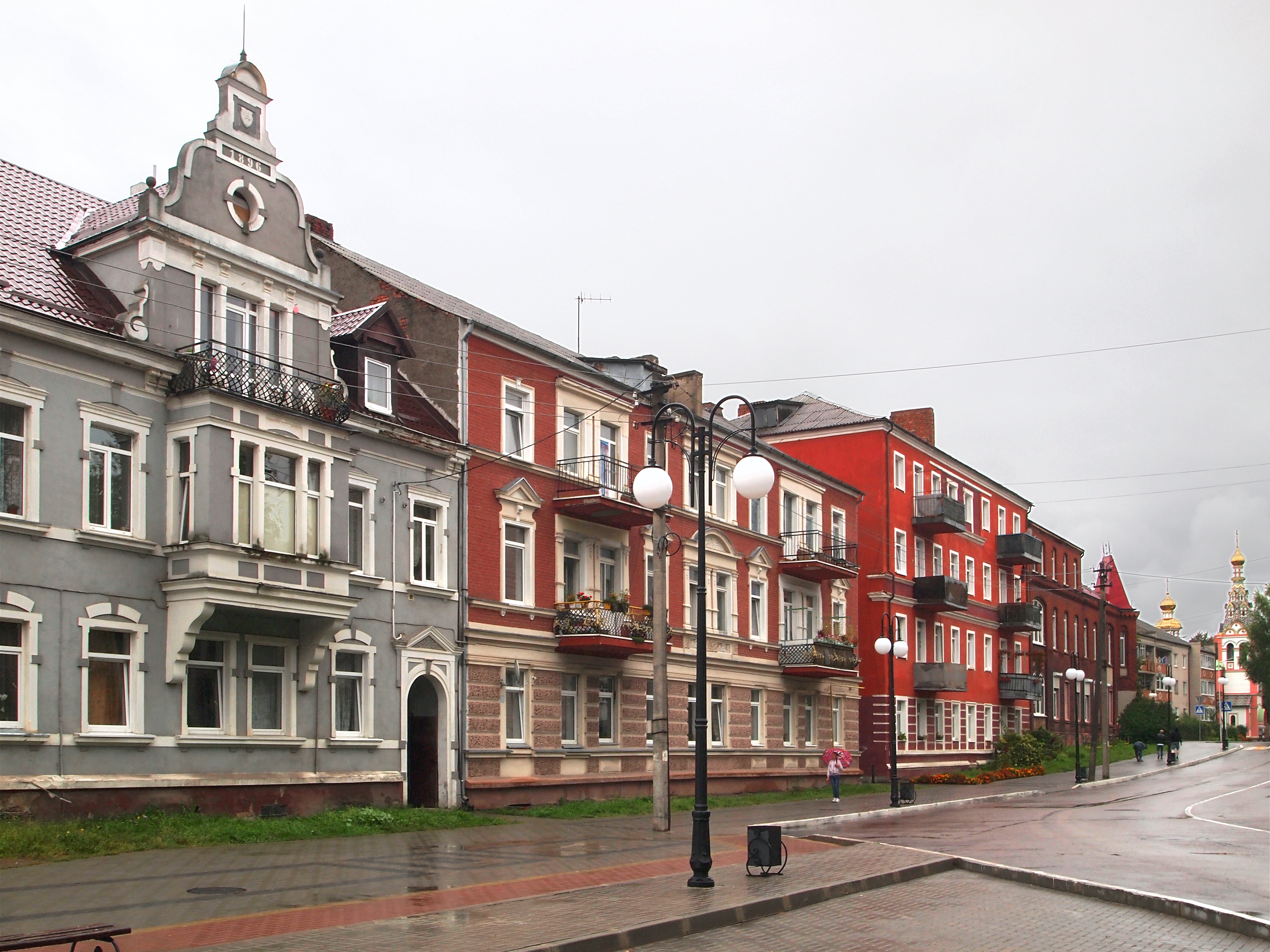
4. Gusev

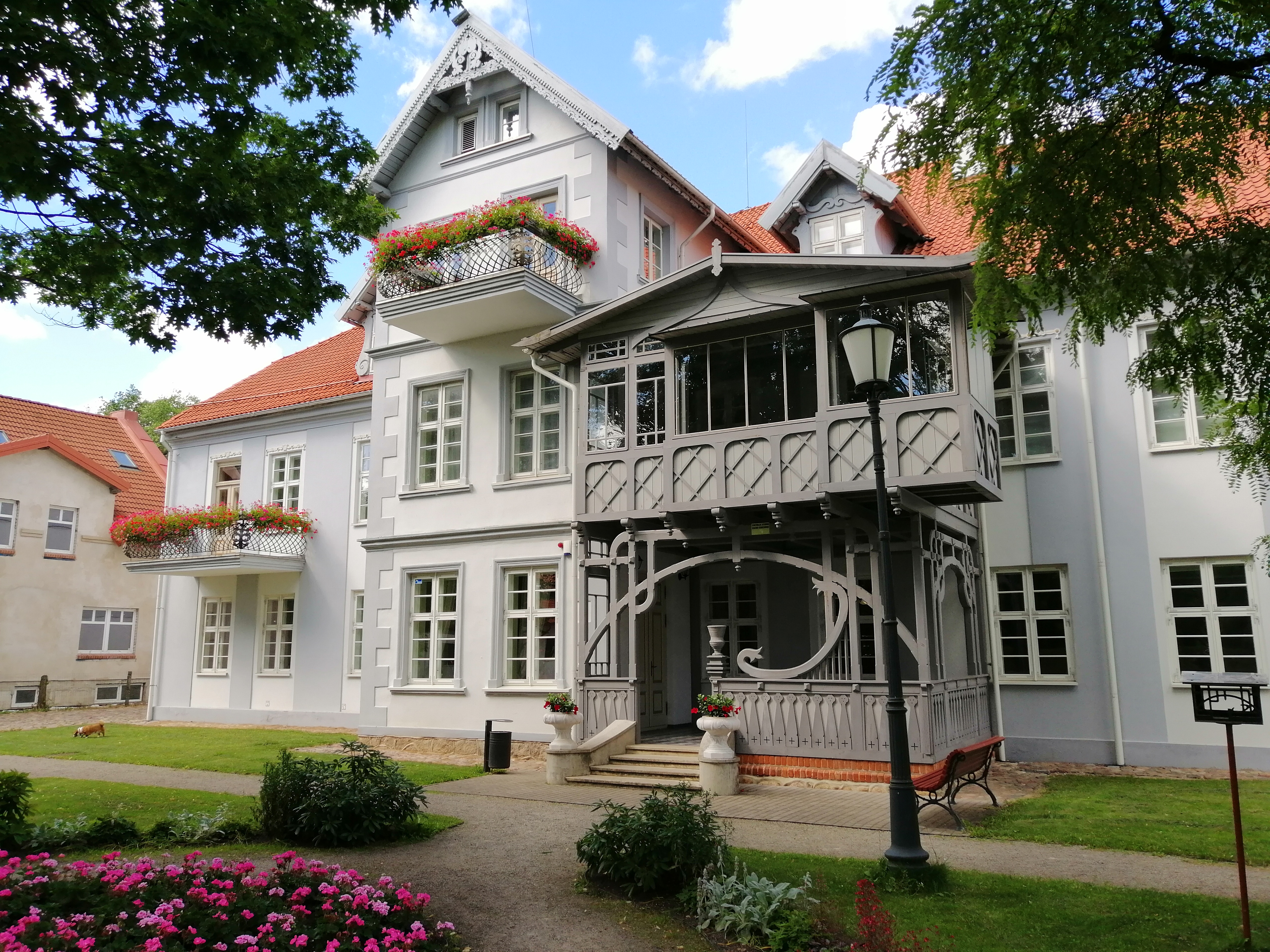
5. Šilutė

== History ==
=== Pre-Lithuania Minor ===
The territory, which was given the denomination Lithuania Minor in the 16th century, was not alien to Lithuanians ethnically as well as politically in earlier times. It had once been partly subject to Mindaugas' Lithuania in the 13th century. Later, captured (1275–76) and ruled by the Teutonic Knights, the land was reckoned, what is recorded in the historical sources, to be their patrimony by Algirdas (officially said) and Vytautas (recorded to be said unofficially).

==== German-Lithuanian rivalry ====
The territory of western Lithuania began to be threatened by the Livonian order from the north and Teutonic Knights from the south in the 13th century. The Orders were seizing the lands of Baltic tribes, one of which – Lithuanians – had its state and was also expanding its power among neighbouring Baltic and Ruthenian people. The Order was granted the right over the pagan lands by popes and emperors of the Holy Roman Empire. It was conqueror's right – awarded them as much lands as they would conquer. After the Battle of Saule the Livonian order was crushed and incorporated to the Teutonic Order as part of it. Mindaugas, in critical political circumstances for his rule, undertook to grant Samogitia to the Order in exchange for baptism and the crown from the pope. After Mindaugas became a king, a direct subject of the Pope, in 1253, the acts of grants of the lands for Livonian Order were written:

- 1253 July, the act granting Nadruvia and Karšuva to the Order, written in Lithuanian curia by Mindaugas.
- 1259 the act granting Dainava and Scalovia to the Order, written by Mindaugas. In the historiography this act is considered to be falsified by the Order.

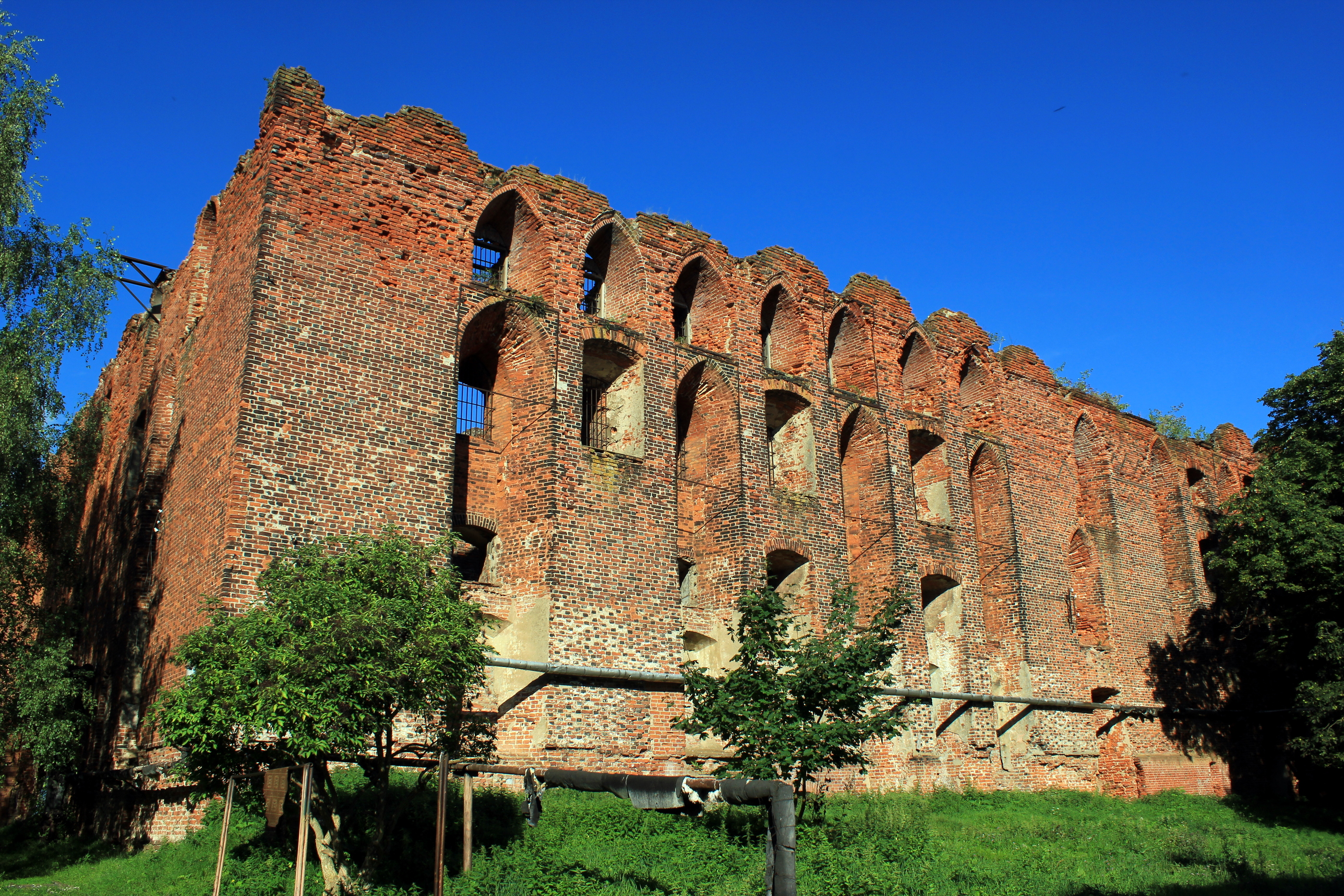
Medieval castle ruins in Neman

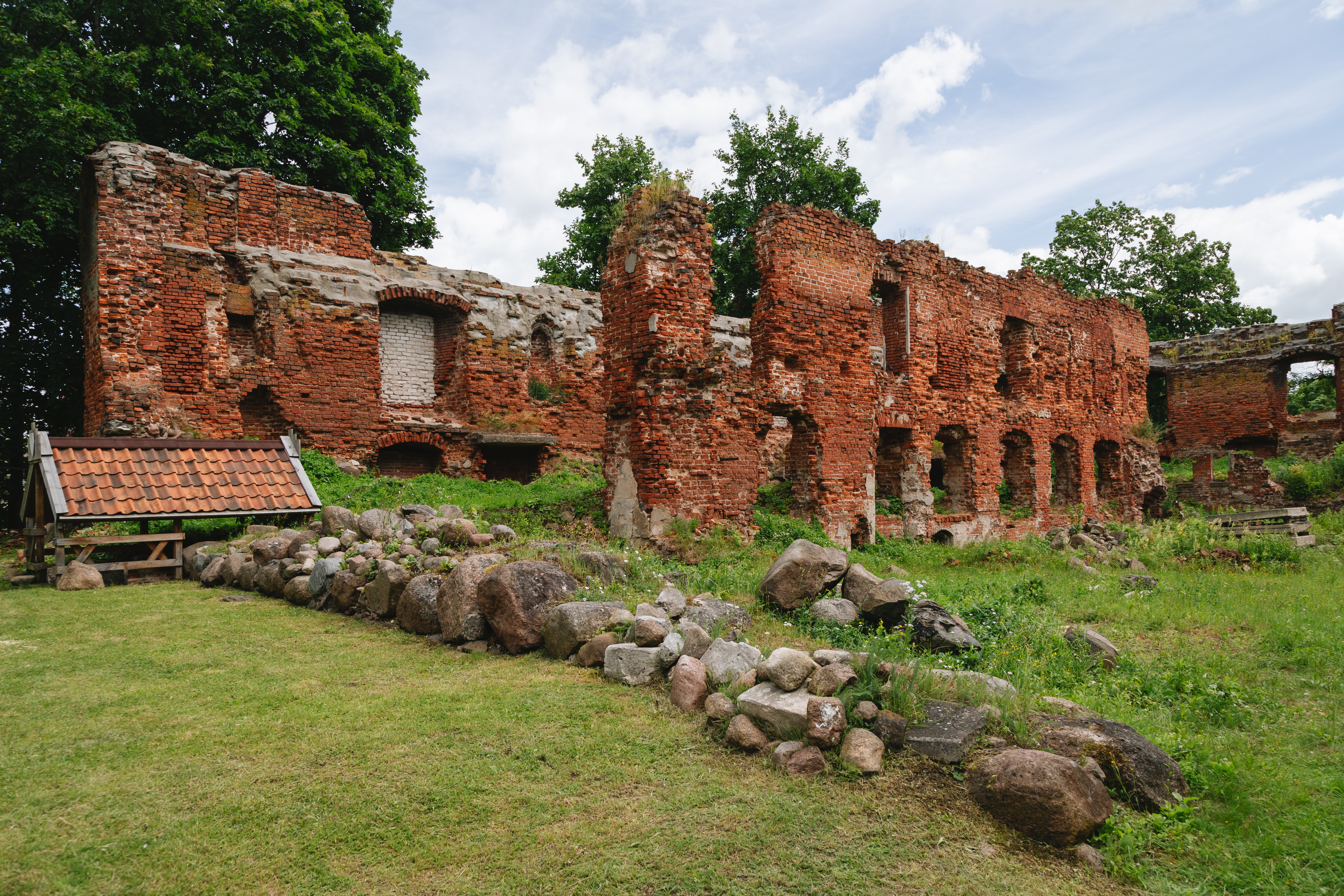
Medieval castle ruins in Chernyakhovsk

All Baltic tribes rose against the Order after the Battle of Durbe (1260). Mindaugas officially canceled his relations with the Livonian Order in 1261 and the acts of grants became invalid. Mindaugas's royal dynasty discontinued when he and two sons were assassinated in 1263. Lithuanian dukes did not join the Prussians in their uprising due to inside instability of the Lithuanian throne. Nadruvia and Scalovia (which comprised much of later Lithuania Minor) had been taken by the Teutonic Knights in 1275–1276 after the Prussian uprising and they reached Neman from the south in 1282. Lithuania also did not manage to retain Semigallian castles lying north from Lithuania and the Semigallians fell under the Order finally during Gediminas's rule. Samogitians, whose land lay between the Livonian Order and the Teutonic Order, had been many times granted to the Order juridically by Lithuanian dukes, popes, emperors of Holy Roman Empire, but either the Order did not managed to take it, or the Lithuanian dukes departed from their treaty and grant. Klaipėda was passed to Teutonic Order from its Livonian branch in 1328.

The patrimony for Nadruvia and Scalovia was remembered by post-Mindaugas grand dukes of Lithuania: Algirdas, during the negotiation on Lithuania's Christianization, postulated (1358) for the emperor of Holy Roman Empire, Charles IV, that he would accept Christianity when the Order was transferred to Russia's border to fight Tatars and Lithuania would be given back the lands to Łyna, Pregolya rivers and Baltic sea. Lithuanian grand dukes probably considered the Order to be illegitimate state, propagandizing the mission of Christianization as the fundamental aim and factually seeking political authority at one time. Additionally, after the Order had become Protestant state, the conquered Baltic lands were not acknowledged as its possession by the popes.

After the Battle of Grunwald the dispute between Grand Duchy of Lithuania and the Order on Samogitia started. Vytautas wanted the border to be the Neman river, while the Order wanted to have Veliuona and Klaipėda in the right side of the river. Both sides agreed to accept the prospective solution of Emperor Sigismund's representative Benedict Makrai. He decided that the right side of Neman (Veliuona, Klaipėda) had to be left for Lithuania (1413). Makrai is known to have stated:

We find that the Memel castle is built in the land of Samogitians. Neither Master, nor the Order was able to prove anything opposing.

The Order did not accept the solution. Later Vytautas agreed the solution to be made by Emperor Sigismund. He acknowledged Samogitians for the Order (1420). Vytautas did not accept the solution. Polish and Lithuanian military, not capturing the castles, devastated Prussia then and the Treaty of Melno was made. Klaipėda was left for the Order. Since the Melno treaty the land later become Lithuania Minor had been officially separated from Lithuania. It became part of the state of the Teutonic Order. In 1454, King Casimir IV Jagiellon incorporated the region into the Kingdom of Poland upon the request of the Prussian Confederation – a league formed in opposition to the Teutonic Order. After the subsequent Thirteen Years' War (1454–1466), the longest of all Polish-Teutonic wars, the Teutonic Order regained authority over the city as a fief of the Polish Crown (and thus the Polish–Lithuanian union).

=== Emergence ===
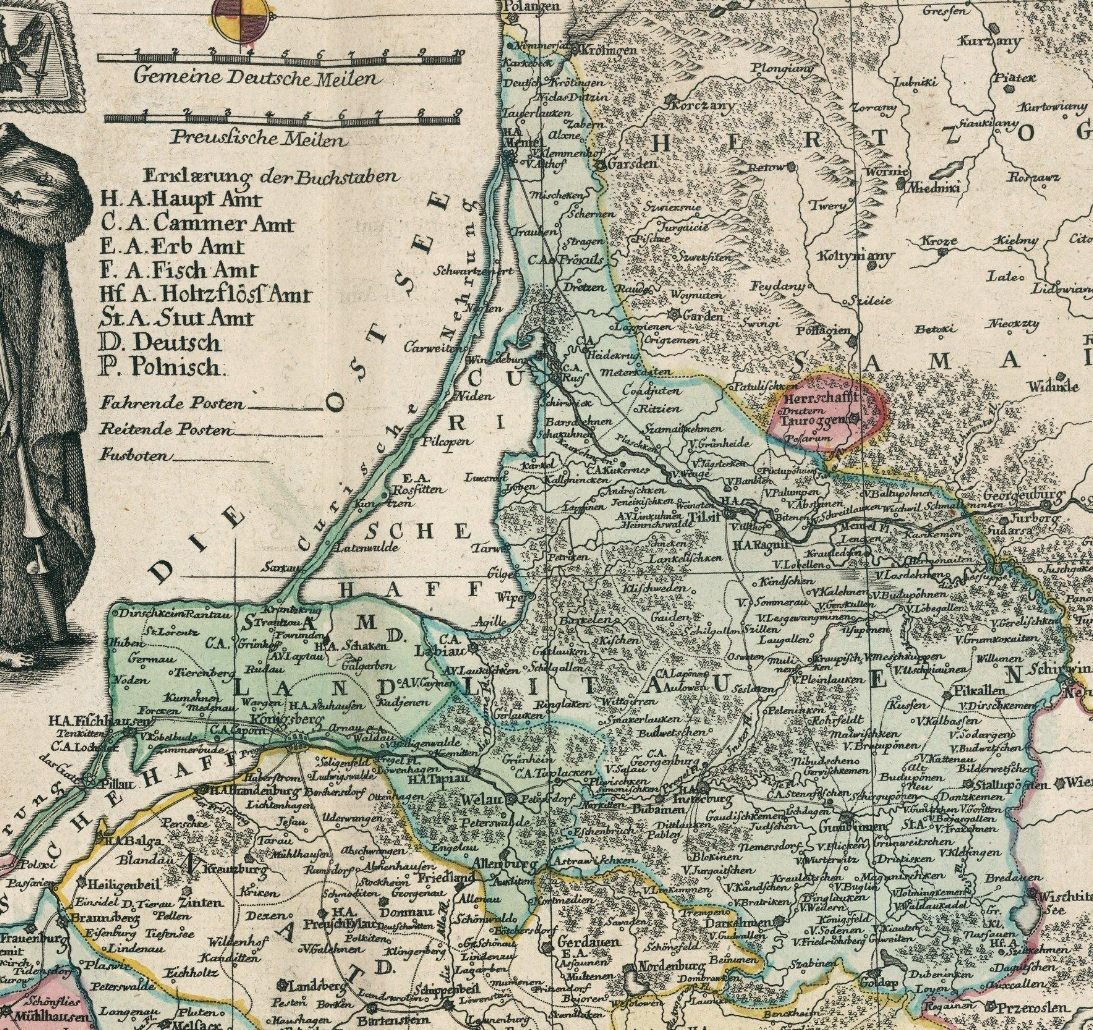
Map of the Lithuania Minor in 1753

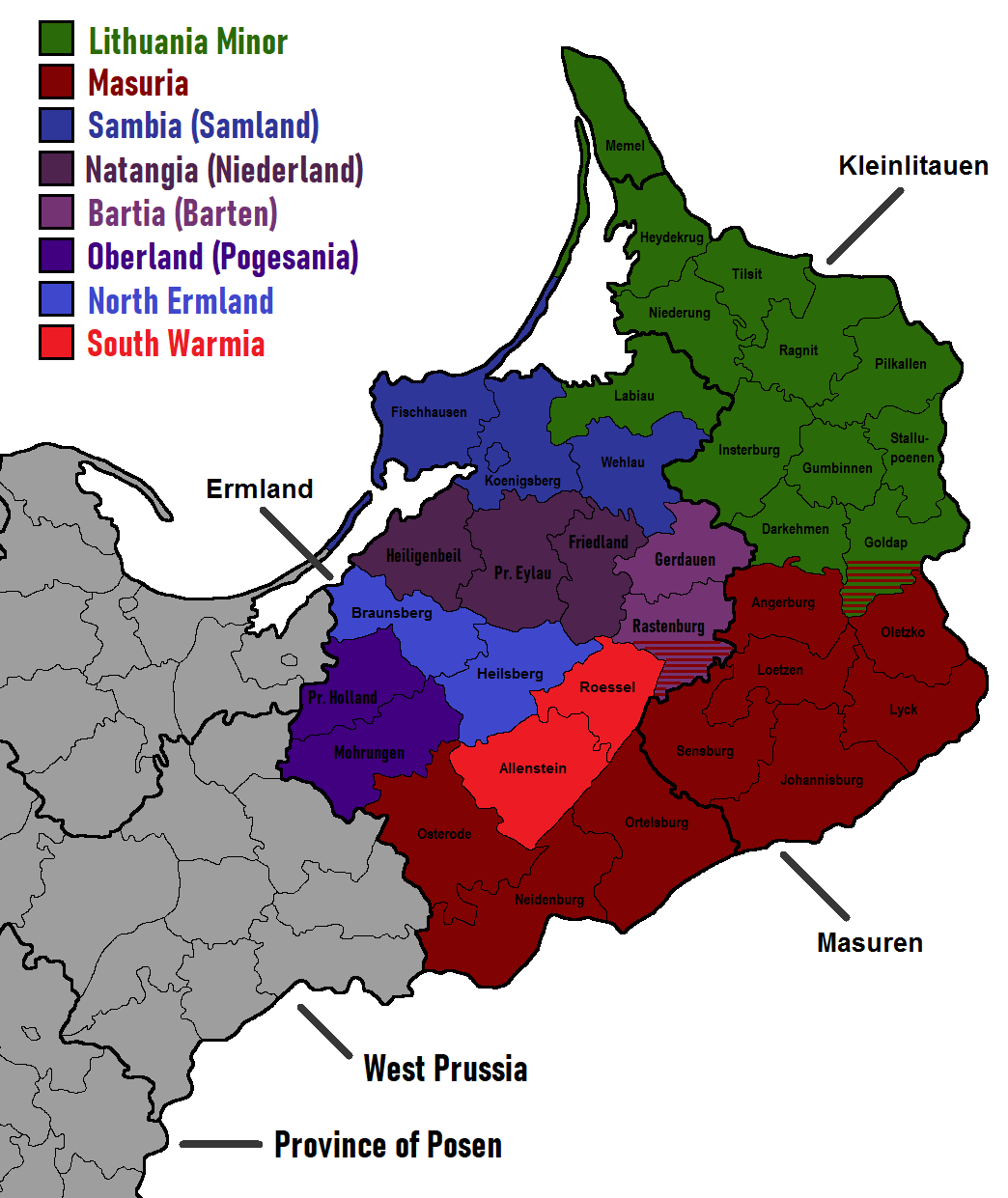
Lithuania Minor within East Prussia

In 1525, per the Treaty of Kraków, the state of the Teutonic Order was secularized and transformed into Ducal Prussia, which remained a vassal duchy of Poland within the Polish–Lithuanian union (soon elevated into the Polish–Lithuanian Commonwealth) until the 1657 Treaty of Bromberg. The term of Lithuania Minor appeared around that time (1517–1526). Lithuania Minor was part of the duchy until 1701, the Kingdom of Prussia until 1871, the German Reich until 1920, and afterwards it was divided. The political border set by the Treaty of Melno had been the same since the treaty to 1923, when the Klaipėda region was incorporated into Lithuania. Polish secret resistance was active and smuggled weapons through the region to the Russian-controlled Augustów Governorate and Samogitia during the January Uprising of 1863–1864. Several local resistance members and smugglers were arrested by the Prussians. The Geographical Dictionary of the Kingdom of Poland from 1892 named Tilsit as the capital of Lithuania Minor.

==== Interbellum and World War II ====
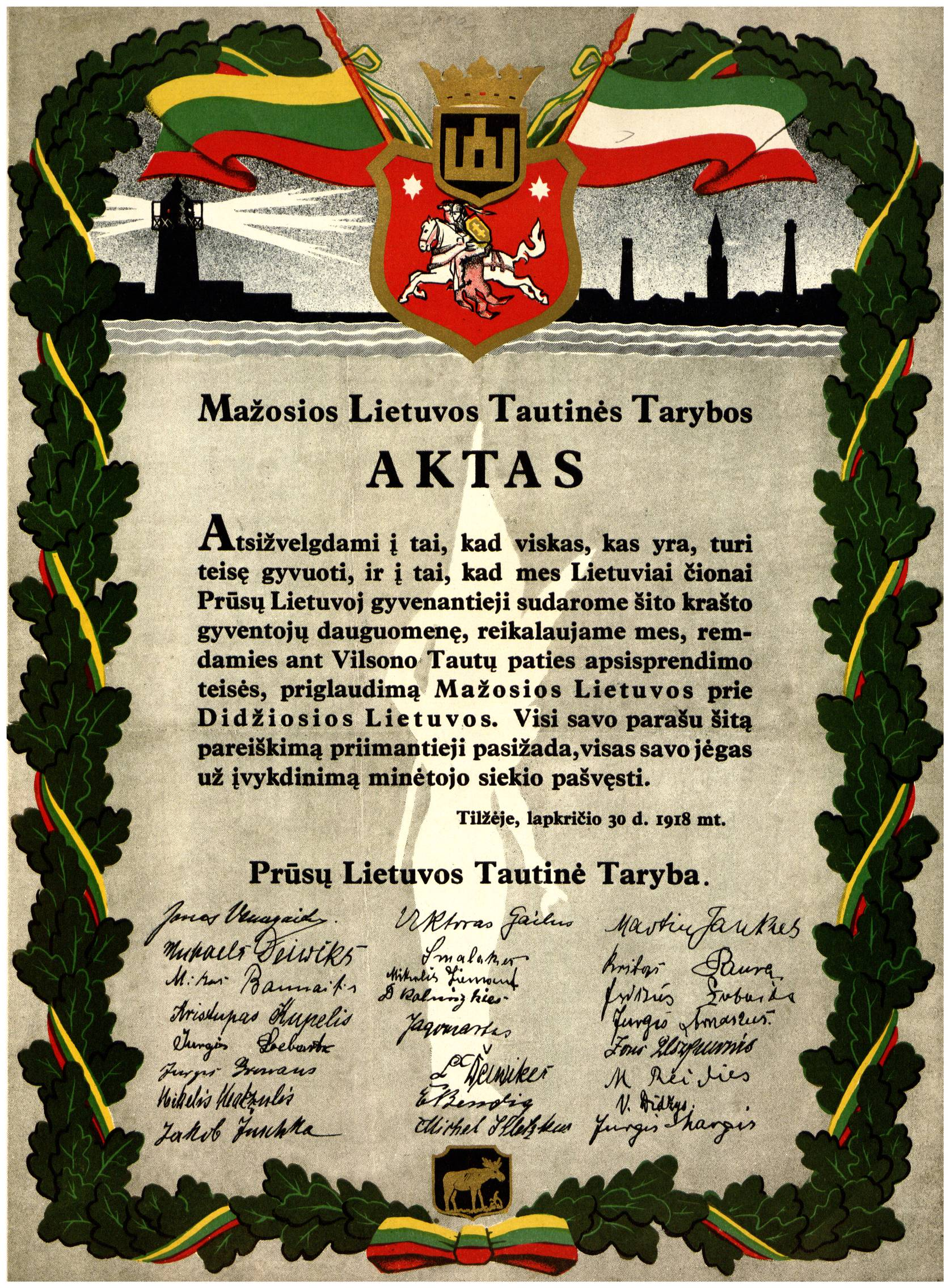
Act of Tilsit

Lithuania declared its independence from Russia in 1918 during World War I. Some Prussian Lithuanian activists signed the Act of Tilsit, demanding unification of Lithuania Minor and Lithuania Major into a single Lithuanian state, thus detaching the areas of East Prussia from Germany which were inhabited by Prussian Lithuanians. This claim was supported by the Lithuanian government. The part north of the Neman river up to Memel was separated from Germany by the Treaty of Versailles in 1920, and was called the Memel Territory. It was made a protectorate of the Entente States, in order to guarantee port rights to Lithuania and Poland. In January 1923, the Klaipėda Revolt took place and Klaipėda region was annexed to Lithuania in 1923 under violation of the Treaty of Versailles. The subsequent incorporation of the territory brought economic prosperity to Lithuania, with the region accounting for 30 percent of the country's economy. However, the region's economic significance declined after economic sanctions were imposed by Nazi Germany in 1933.

Nazi Germany persecuted the Lithuanian population of the German-controlled part of the region. In 1938 a massive campaign of renaming of placenames was carried out in the German-held part of Lithuania Minor in attempt to erase traces of Lithuanian origin. In 1940, the last Lithuanian newspaper published in Tilsit was closed by the Nazis.

German Foreign Minister Joachim von Ribbentrop delivered an ultimatum to the Lithuanian Foreign Minister on 20 March 1939, demanding the surrender of the Klaipėda region to German control. Ribbentrop vowed that if Klaipėda was not ceded to Germany peacefully, it "will be taken by other means if necessary". Lithuania submitted to the ultimatum and, in exchange for the right to use the new harbour facilities as a Free Port, ceded the disputed region to Germany in the late evening of 22 March 1939. Reunion of the Memel Territory with Germany was met with joy by a majority of Prussian Lithuanians. It was Nazi Germany's last territorial gain prior to World War II.

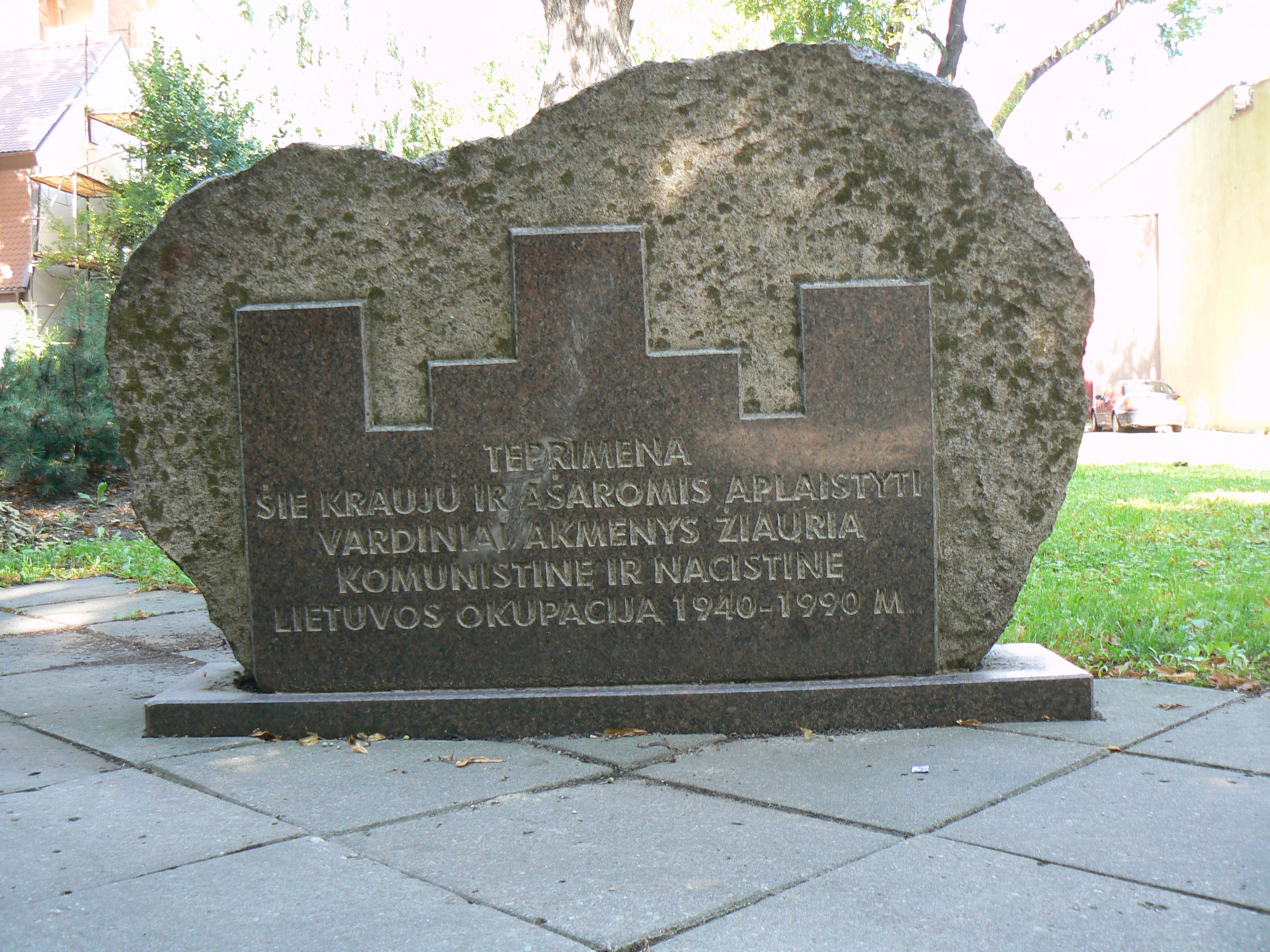
Memorial to victims of Soviet and Nazi occupation in Klaipėda

During World War II, the Germans operated the Hohenbruch concentration camp at present-day Gromovo (Lithuanian: Lauknos), as well as several prisoner-of-war camps for Allied POWs of various nationalities, incl. the Stalag 331 C/I-C and Stalag I-D camps for regular soldiers, the Stalag Luft VI camp and Dulag Luft transit camp for air force personnel, Oflags 52, 53, 60 for officers, and forced labour subcamps of Stalag I-A. Groups of Poles expelled from German-occupied Poland were deported by the Germans to forced labour in the region (in the vicinity of Klaipėda and Tilsit). In October 1944, Soviet troops committed the Nemmersdorf massacre, killing some 74 German civilians and 50 French and Belgian prisoners of war, captives of Germany.

==== Post-World War II ====
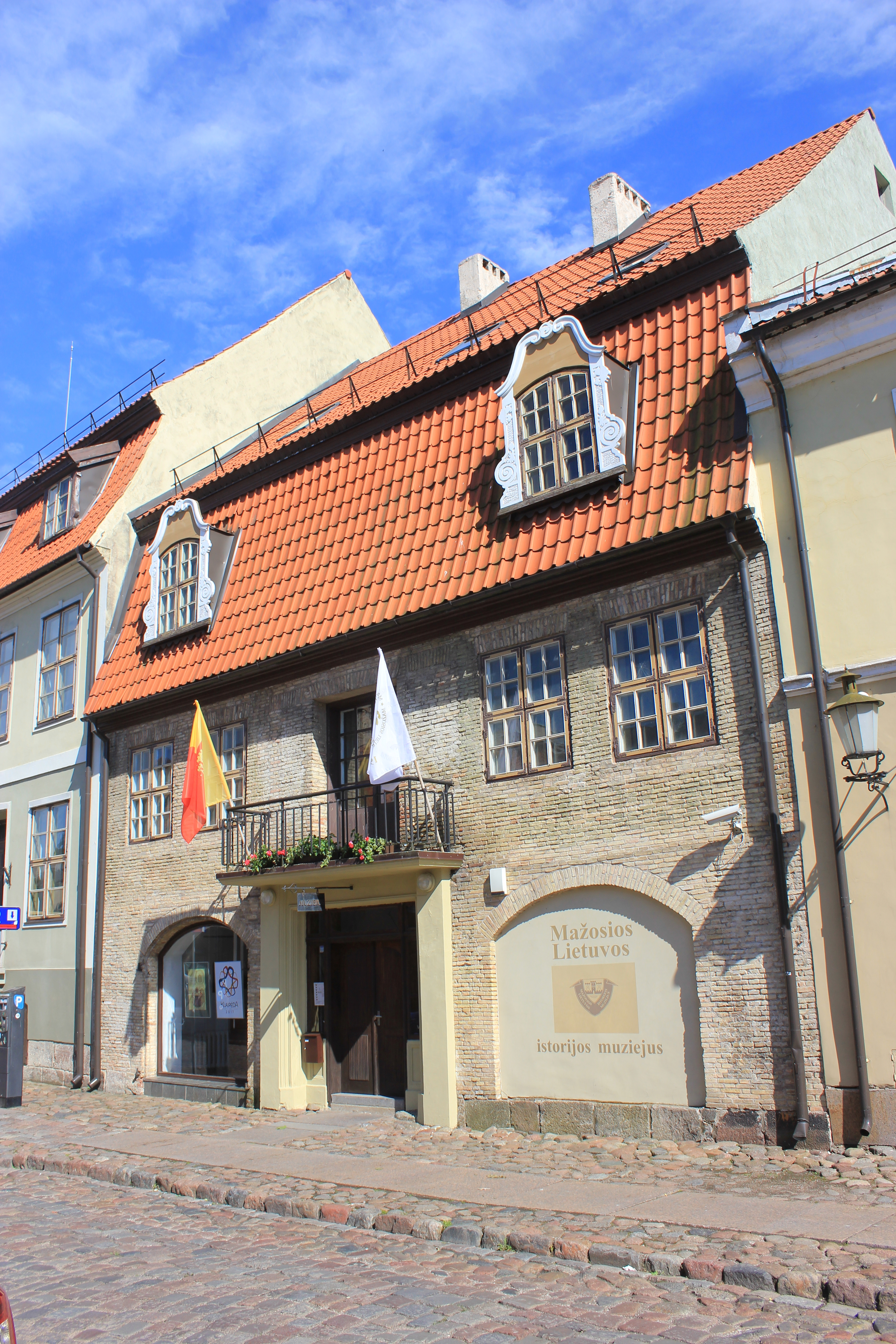
History museum of Lithuania Minor in Klaipėda

At the end of the war, the local German and Lithuanian population of the former East Prussia either fled or was expelled to the western parts of Germany. The Soviet Union recaptured Lithuania in 1944 and the Memel region was incorporated into the newly formed Lithuanian SSR in 1945 while the remainder of Lithuania Minor was divided between Poland (small parts now forming the Warmian-Masurian Voivodeship) and the Soviet Union (eastern part of the Kaliningrad Oblast).

After the death of Joseph Stalin, Nikita Khrushchev offered the Kaliningrad Oblast to the Lithuanian SSR. Secretary Antanas Sniečkus refused this offer. In 2010, a secret document was found which indicated that in 1990, the Soviet leadership was prepared to negotiate the return of Kaliningrad to Germany against payment. The proposal was declined by German diplomats. After the dissolution of the Soviet Union, the Kaliningrad Oblast has become an exclave of Russia. Lithuania, Germany, and Poland lay no official claims to the region at this time.

Gołdap (Lithuanian: Geldapė, Galdapė, Geldupė), the seat of Gołdap County, a transitional county between Lithuania Minor and Masuria, is the largest municipality of the region within Poland, however, it is also considered part of Masuria and is not inhabited by an autochthonous Lithuanian population.

== Ethnic history ==
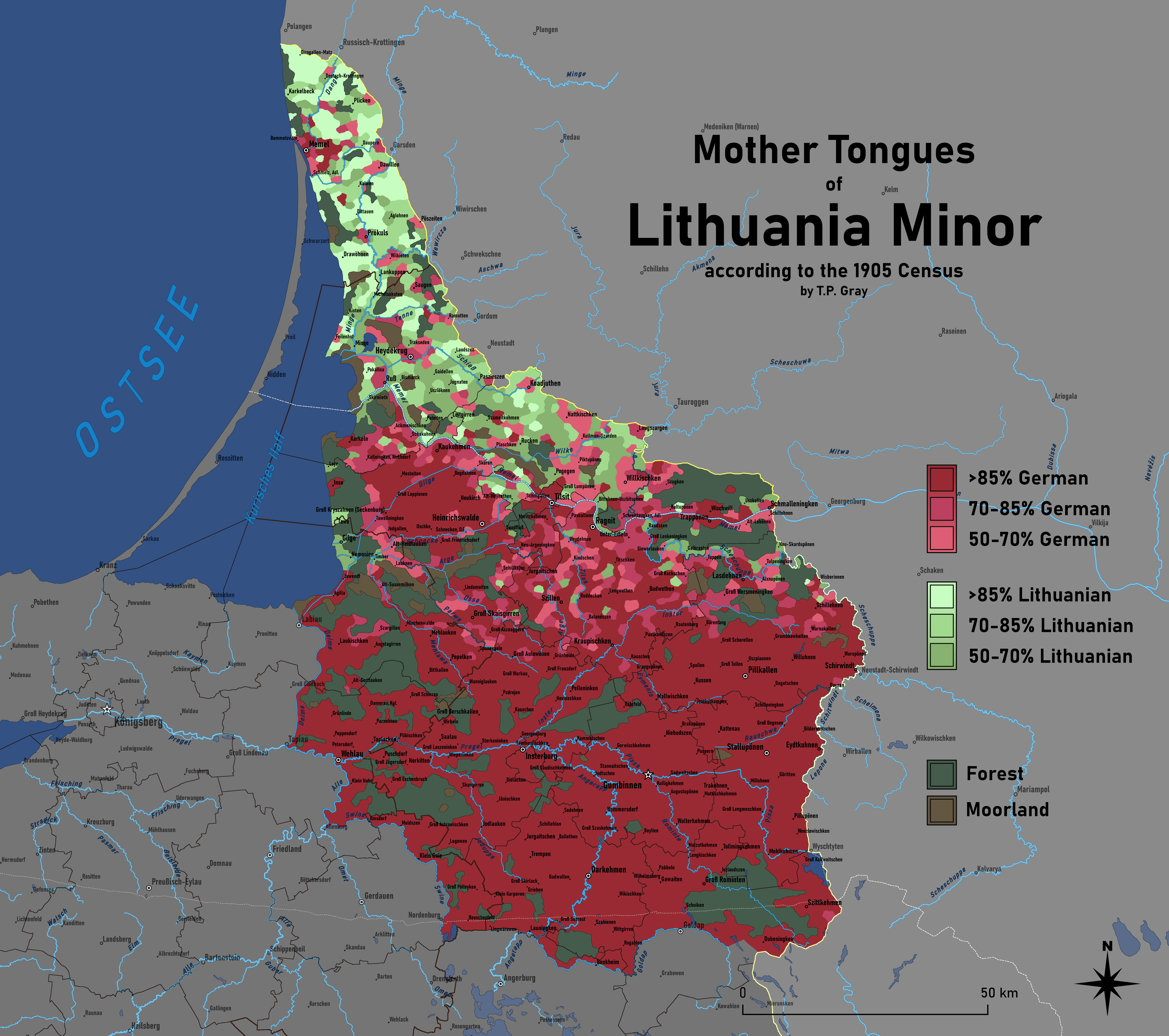
Mother tongues of Lithuania Minor, according to the 1905 census; towns with a majority of Lithuanian speakers are indicated in shades of green

=== Descent of Lietuvininkai ===
==== Historiography ====
Originally it was thought that Prussian Lithuanians were autochthones to Prussia. The base for it was A. Bezzenberger's line of Prussian-Lithuanian language limit. The theory proposed that Nadruvians and Scalovians were western Lithuanians and the ancestors of Lietuvininks. It was prevalent until 1919.

The second theory proposed that the first Lithuanian inhabitants of the territory which later became Lithuania Minor appeared only after the war had ended. The theory was started by G. Mortensen in 1919. She stated, that Scalovians, Nadruvians and Sudovians were Prussians before the German invasion and Lithuanians were colonists of the 15–16th centuries from the Grand Duchy of Lithuania – Samogitia and Suvalkija. G. Mortensen created a conception of the wilderness, according to which the vicinities of both sides of the Neman up to Kaunas had become desolate in the 13–14th centuries. According to G. Mortensen's husband H. Mortensen Lithuanian resettlement began in the last quarter of the 15th century. Lithuanian historian K. Jablonskis etc., archaeologist P. Kulikauskas etc. denied the idea of desolate land, uninhabited forests (Old German wildnis, wiltnis) and mass Lithuanian migration. The idea of Lithuanian immigration was accepted by Antanas Salys, Zenonas Ivinskis. J. Jurginis had studied the descriptions of the war roads into Lithuania and found where the word wildnis was used in the political sense. He deduced that wildnis was that part of Lithuania which belonged to the Order juridically, by the grants of the popes and emperors of Holy Roman Empire, but was not subordinate to it due to the resistance of the residents. The theory of desolate land was also criticized by Z. Zinkevičius, who has thought that old Baltic toponymy could be only preserved by the remaining local people.

H. Łowmiański thought that Nadruvian and Scalovian tribes had changed ethnically due to Lithuanian colonization as early as times of tribal social order. Linguist Z. Zinkevičius has presumed that Nadruvians and Skalovians were transitive tribes between Lithuanians and Prussians since much earlier times than German invasion had occurred.

==== Background ====
The German invasion and the war was the factor changing the former order of the Baltic area. While the German Order was expanding its territory, the holding of Lithuanian grand dukes was withdrawn in some places. The political situation during the war was influenced by the following factors:

- The situation of the war technologies. The Teutonic Order built many stone fortresses in the Baltic lands thus gaining the control over the ethnically foreign lands. Nadruvia was full of German castles.
- The geographical situation. The Neman river became a kind of a front line between the Order and Lithuania during the several decades of the war after the German invasion. There were German castles up to Kaunas by Neman in the 14th century. Germans built their castles by the Lithuanian and vice versa. The wide forest stretched in the land by the left side of the middle reaches of the Neman, what was Sudovia or Suvalkija. It could originate as a wide border between Lithuanian and Sudovian tribes before pre-nation times of Lithuanians and also could expand due to the war. The land was sparse of German castles. The conquered Baltic lands were all called Prussia by the Teutonic Order but not all the lands with the German castles managed to build in them became occupied. The presence of the Neman river, also possibly the forests in Sudovia, Karšuva afforded the most economical variant for the defensive fortifications.

The war probably changed the situation of populations of the area:

- The demographic situation. The population of the territory which lain between the chief lands of Lithuanian state and Nadruvia – what was in the Grand Duchy of Lithuania and the northern half of Sudovia or Suvalkija – was sparse. Nadruvia possibly also became more depopulated than those Lithuanian lands which lay on the right side of the Neman during the war between the Teutonic Order, the Old Prussians, and the Grand Duchy of Lithuania.
- The ethnical situation. The German invasion and the war between the latter state and Lithuanian one reduced, was expelling the local population to some extent and impelled some migrations of Baltic tribes. In the abstract, Nadruvia, Scalovia and Sudovia had to be inhabited by Nadruvians, Scalovians and Sudovians. All these three tribes are considered to have once been western Baltic, but the Lithuanian impact, close relations and immigration, is likely to be occurred before the German invasion.

==== Prussian Lithuanian population ====
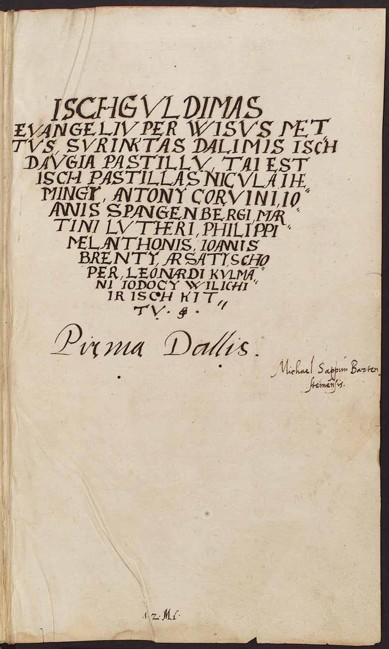
Wolfenbüttel Postil is the oldest known postil (manuscript) written in the Lithuanian language, 1573

The two main lands later became Lithuania Minor, Nadruvia and Scalovia, had Prussian ethnic substratum. Lithuanian elements prevailed in the toponymy of the territory, though. It is possible that Nadruvia and Skalovia had changed ethnically in the process of Lithuanian penetration to and consolidation of the Baltic lands in the pre-state times. The contacts between Nadruvian and Scalovian populations with those to the north and west, where the grand dukes of Lithuania were ruling from the 13th or the 12th century, were probably close. Nadruvia had bordered on Sudovia and Samogitia, Skalovia – on Samogitia and Nadruvia. The inside Baltic migration, trading and ethnic consolidation presumably had happened since the earlier times than the German military invasion occurred.

The land probably depopulated during the war and the source of the regeneration of the population was internal as well as presumably mainly external from neighbouring areas. The land was resettled by returning refugees and newcomers from the Grand Duchy of Lithuania. After the permanent war had ended finally with the Treaty of Melno in 1422, the population continued to grow. The newcomers were Lithuanians from Trakai, Vilnius voideships and Samogitia. Lithuanian farmers used to flee to the Sudovian forest, which lain in the Trakai Voivodeship, and live here without dues, what was possible until the agrarian reform of Lithuania, performed during the second half of the 16th century.

The tribal areas such as Nadruvia, Scalovia, Sudovia had to some extent later coincided with the political administrative and the ethnic areas. Nadruvia and Scalovia became Lithuanian Province in Prussia and the Yotvingian population persisted in their lands more commonly as western Lithuanians in the Grand Duchy of Lithuania and Prussia.

=== Distribution ===
As a distinctive ethno-cultural region, Lithuania Minor emerged during the 15th or the 16th century. The substratum of the Prussian Lithuanian population comprised mostly ethnic Baltic tribes – either local (Old Prussians – Sambians, north Bartians, Natangians; either probably formerly Lithuanized or Prussian Scalovians and Nadruvians; Sudovians, some Curonians) or from neighbouring areas (newcomers from the Grand Duchy of Lithuania: Lithuanians from the right side of the middle reaches of the Neman or Suvalkija, Samogitians, Sudovians, Prussians etc.). Colonists from the Holy Roman Empire also contributed to the Lithuanian population to some extent. Prussians and Yotvingians tended to be assimilated by Lithuanians in Lithuania Minor.

Lithuanian percentage decreased to about half of population in about half of the area eastwards from Łyna river and northwards from the lower reaches of Pregolya during the 18th century. Lithuanian percentage of the area was continually decreasing during the ages since the plague of 1709–1711. In 1724, King Frederick William I of Prussia prohibited Poles, Samogitians and Jews from settling in Lithuania Minor, and initiated German colonization to change the region's ethnic composition. Lithuanians constituted the majority only in about half of the Memelland area and by Tilžė and Ragainė from the last quarter of the 19th century upwards to 1914. Lithuanian percentage was marginal in the southern half of the region of Lithuania Minor at that time. There resided about 170 thousands of Lietuvininks in East Prussia till 1914.

==== Administration ====
The territory known as the main part of Lithuania Minor had been distinguished in administrative terms first as Nadruvia and Scalovia, later the names Lithuanian counties, Lithuanian Province, Prussian Lithuania or Lithuania (Litauische Kreise or Litt(h) auen) became predominant. The administrative Lithuanian Province (part of the administrative province of Sambia) (about 10 000 km^{2}) comprised four districts of that time: Klaipėda (Memel), Tilžė (Tilsit, Sovetsk), Ragainė (Raganita, Ragnit, Neman) and Įsrutis (Insterburg, Cerniachovsk).

==== Reckoning ====
The factual Prussian Lithuanian living area was broader than the administrative Lithuanian Province. Several Lithuanian-linked areas were determined on different criteria in the 19th and the beginning of the 20th century by mostly German researchers (Lithuanians, without doing difference between the residents of Russian Empire and of Prussia, were considered by Germans in the 19th century to be the little nation facing its end. Therefore, the various researches on Lithuanian culture were made):

- Lithuanian inhabited area indicated by toponymic data. The language line between Old Prussian and Lithuanian languages was determined by A. Bezzenberger (linguistic, archaeological and geographical data) and M. Toeppen (historical data). A. Bezzenberger found that toponyms in the right side of Łyna and north from Pregolya after the Łyna fall were mostly Lithuanian (with -upē (upē – a river), -kiemiai, -kiemis, -kēmiai (kiemas – a village)) and in the left side – mostly Prussian (with -apē (apē – a river), -kaimis (kaimis – a village). Thus, the area (11 430 km²) was considered to be Lithuanian lived and its southern limit was roughly the same as the southern limit of Nadruvia administrative unit. Lithuania Minor is commonly understand to be this area.
- The area of traditional Lithuanian architecture. The original layout of the country seats, the architectural style. The territory between Königsberg, the lower reaches of Pregolya and Łyna river was architecturally mixed – of German-Lithuanian pattern. The latter area was inhabited by mostly Prussians and Lithuanians, later – Germans and Lithuanians. The Lithuanian Province together with the latter area and Sambia peninsula presents the broader perception of Lithuania Minor (about 18 000 km²).
- The area of the everyday vocabulary of Lithuanian country
- The area of churches where Lithuanian sermons were used in 1719. F. Tetzner on the ground of the list of villages where Lithuanian sermons were used in 1719 defined the southern limit of Lithuanian parishes. F. Tetzner wrote in the beginning of the 20th century: 200 years ago the Lithuanian language area embraced, not mentioning the ten present districts of Prussia, also these: Koenigsberg, Žuvininkai, Vėluva, Girdava, Darkiemis and Gumbinė districts. Lithuanian sermons were finished in the last century in Muldžiai, Girdava district, also coastal villages around Žuvininkai and in the Koenigsberg district.

The limits of the latter Lithuanian areas were more southwest. Various other fragmentary demographic sources (the first general census was made in 1816) and the lists of colonists of the 18th century showed the area of Lithuanian majority and the areas of considerable percentage of Lithuanians to the first half of the 18th century. It was more southwest from the once existed administrative Lithuanian Province.

The southern limit of Lithuania Minor went by Šventapilis (Mamonovo), Prūsų Ylava (Preußisch Eylau, Bagrationovsk), Bartenstein (Bartoszyce), Barčiai (Dubrovka), Lapgarbis (Cholmogorovka), Mėrūniškai (Meruniszki), Dubeninkai (Dubeninki). The southern limit of the most compact Lithuanian area went by Žuvininkai, Königsberg, Frydland, Engelschtein (Węgielsztyn), Nordenburg (Krylovo), Węgorzewo, Gołdap, Gurniai, Dubeninkai.

=== Ethnic composition ===
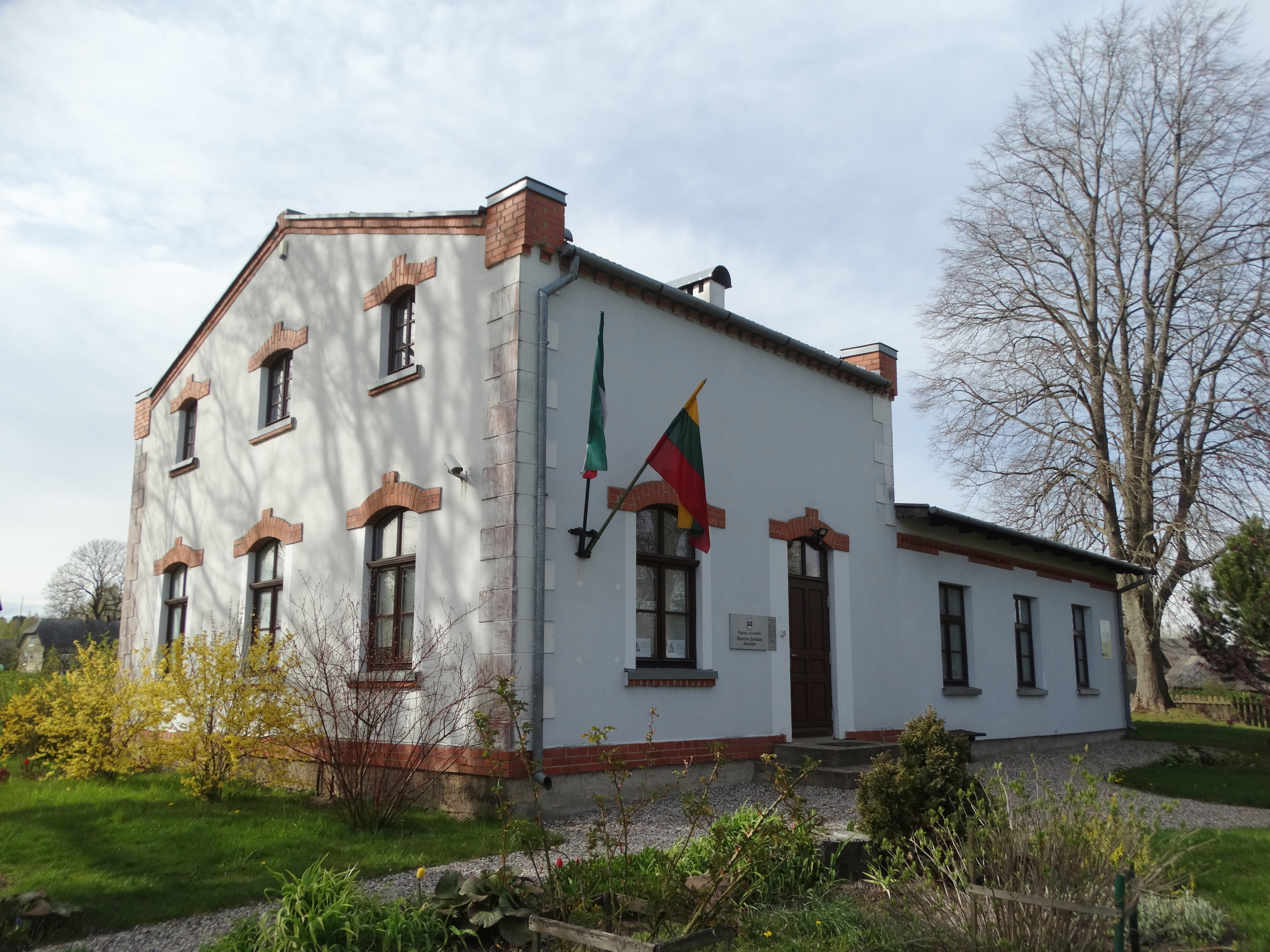
Former printing press of Martynas Jankus, presently a museum, in Bitėnai

The economic and especially demographic statistics had been fragmentary previous to the first general census of 1816. The accounting after the native tongue had begun since the census of 1825–1836.

Thus, the situation of ethnic composition previous to the century is known from the various separate sources: various records and inventories, descriptions and memoirs of contemporaries, language of the sermons used in the churches, registers of births and deaths; various state published documents: statutes, acts, decrees, prescriptions, declarations etc. The lists of peasants‘ pays for plots and grinding of flour was also demographic source. Lithuanian and German proportion of Piliakalnis (Dobrovolsk) in the middle of the 18th century was determined by O. Natau on the ground of these lists. The toponymy of Prussia and its changes is also a source for situation of Lithuanians.

The nationality of the residents of the country of Lithuania Minor is best shown by the sources from the fourth decade of the 18th century. In the process of the colonization of Lithuania Minor the order to check the circumstance of the state peasants was issued. The data showed the distribution by nationalities and the number of state peasants in the Lithuanian Province. The data was used by M. Beheim-Svarbach, who published the tabulations of the territorial distribution of Lithuanian and German villeins (having their farm) in all the villages and districts of Lithuanian Province. The data from the lists of colonists, which shown their descent, was published by G. Geking, G. Schmoler, A. Skalveit in their researches.

==== Lietuvininkai ====
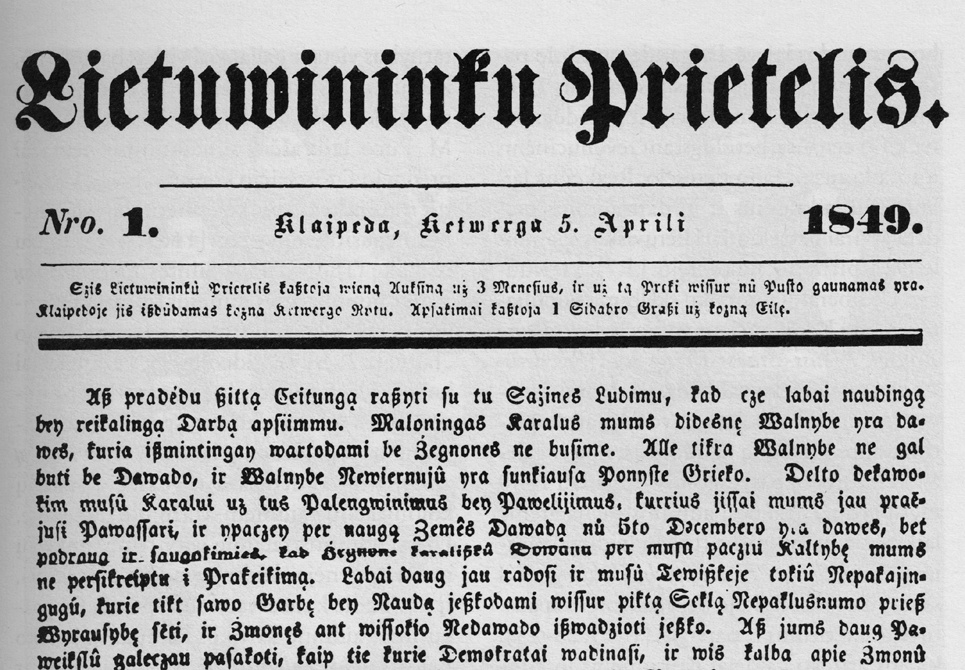
First issue of the Lietuvininkų prietelis newspaper, issued in Klaipėda in 1849

The ethnic Lithuanian inhabitants of Lithuania Minor called themselves Lietuvininkai (other form Lietuvninkai). L. Baczko wrote around the end of the 18th century:

all this nation, which, mixed with many German colonists, is living from Memel to Labiau, from Schirwindt to Nordenburg, call themselves Lietuvninkai and their land – Lithuania

The historical sources indicate that Lietuvininkai is one of two historical ways to call all Lithuanians. Lietuvninkai (Литовники) are mentioned in the recording (1341) of the second chronicle of Pskov. In what had been the Grand Duchy of Lithuania, the word lietuvis became more popular, while in Lithuania Minor lietuvininkas was preferred. Prussian Lithuanians also called their northern neighbors in Samogitia "Russian Lithuanians" and their south-eastern neighbors of the Suwałki region "Polish Lithuanians". Some sources used the term Lietuvininkai to refer to any inhabitant of Lithuania Minor irrelevant of their ethnic adherence.

Lithuanian population presumably grew after the wars ended with the Treaty of Melno in 1422. The Samogitian newcomers were more common in the northern part of it and Aukštaitian in the western one.

Lithuanians lived mostly in the rural areas. German towns were like islands in the Lithuanian Province. The area was overwhelmingly inhabited by Lithuanians until the plague of 1709–1711. Up to 300,000 people resided in the Lithuanian Province and the Labguva district prior to the plague, during which about 160,000 Lithuanians died in Lithuanian Province and Labguva district, which was 53 percent of the population of the latter area.

===== Ethnic situation during the 19th century =====
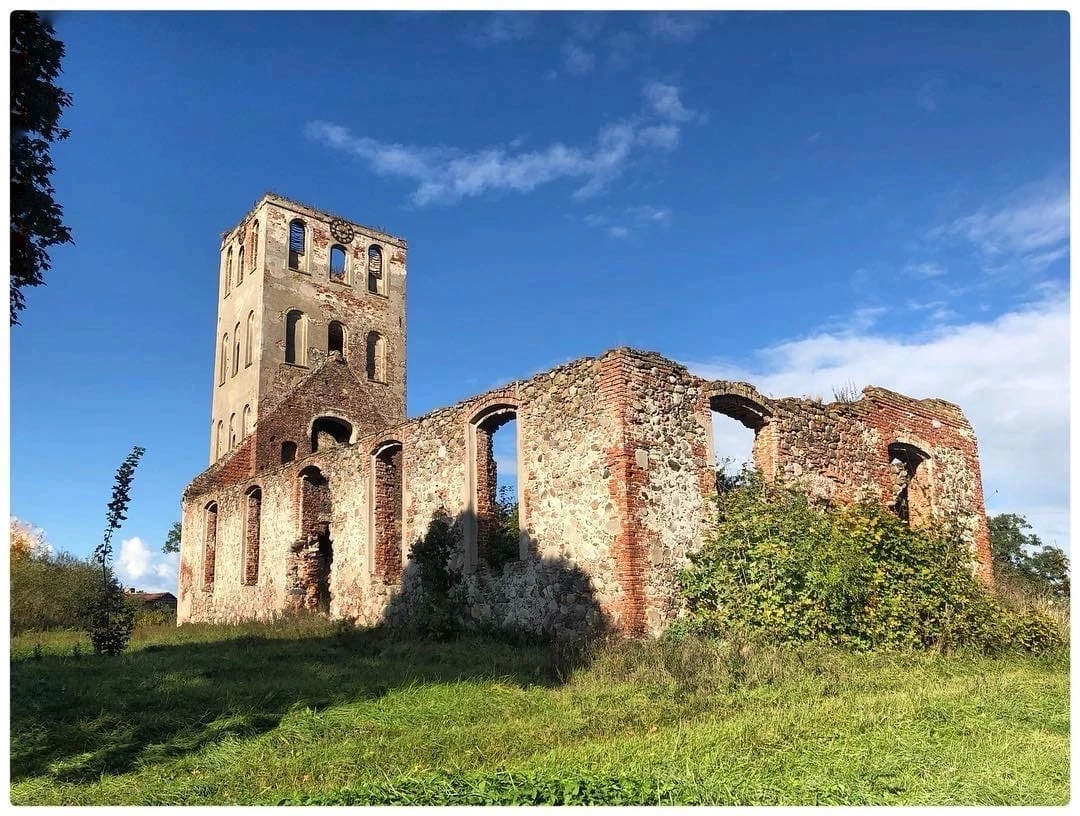
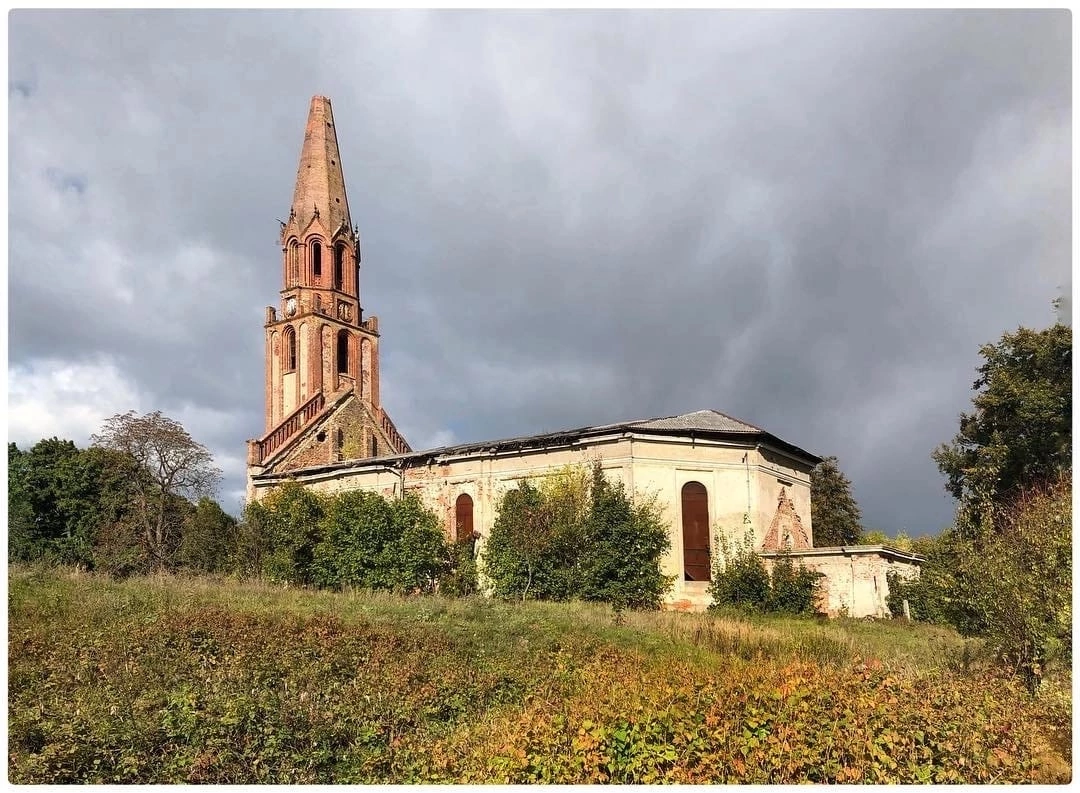
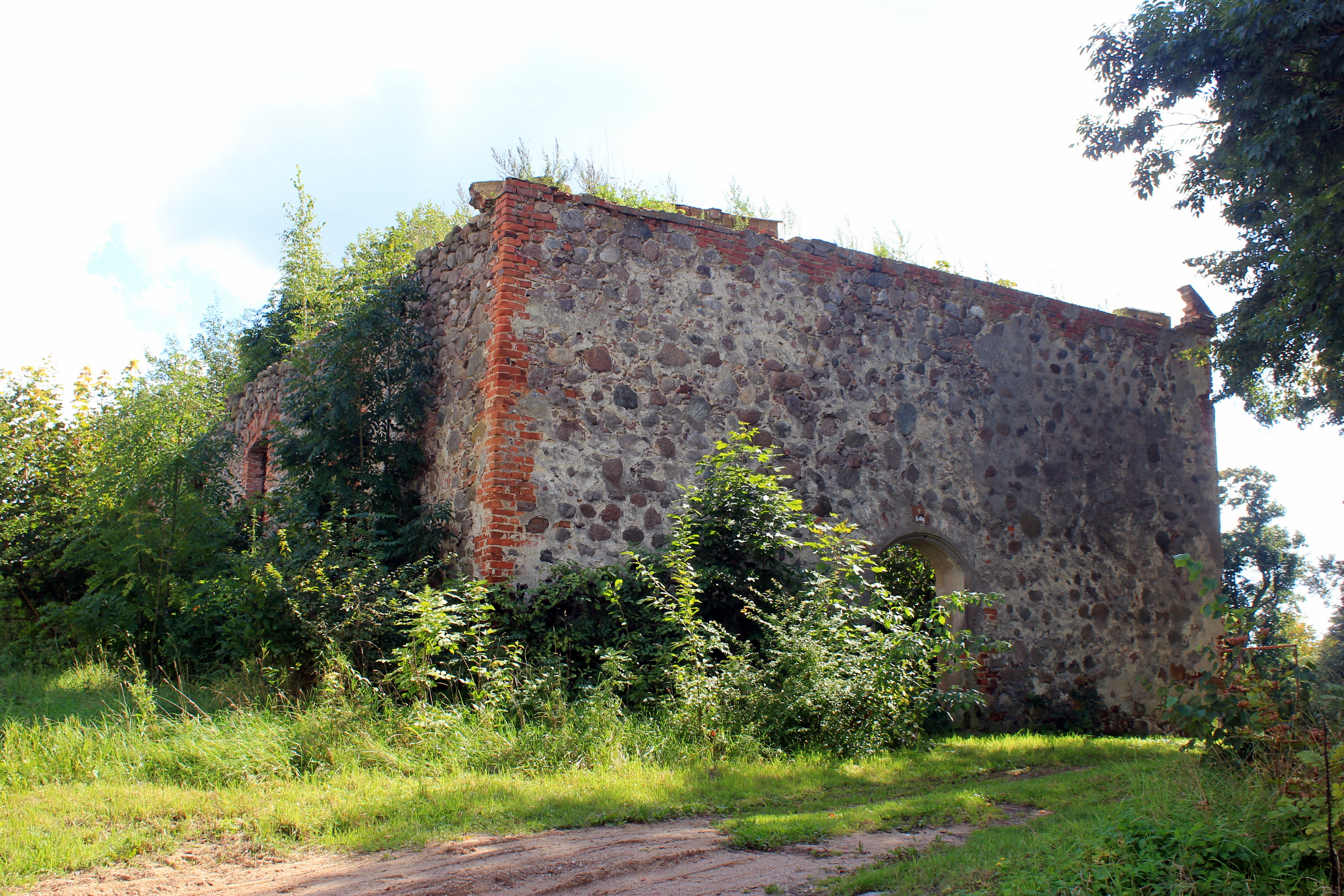
Ruins of 18th-century Lithuanian churches in Timiryazevo (Joneikiškiai), Yasnoye (Kaukėnai), Vesnovo (Kusai) and Ulyanovo (Kraupiškas)

As a result of the plague of 1709–1711, German colonization and Germanisation policies, the ethnic composition of the region in the 19th centuries changed to the disadvantage of the Lithuanians and Poles and in favor of the Germans. According to Prussian data from 1837, ethnic Lithuanians still formed a sizeable portion of the population in the northern counties of the region, especially in rural areas, ranging from 33,9 percent in the Labiau/Labguva (Polessk) county to 74,4 percent in the Heydekrug (Šilutė) county. Also ethnic Polish, Curonian, Latvian and Jewish minorities lived in the region. The majority of Polish and Lithuanian inhabitants were Lutherans, not Roman Catholics like their ethnic kinsmen across the border in the Russian Empire.

In 1817, East Prussia had 796,204 Evangelical Christians, 120,123 Roman Catholics, 864 Mennonites and 2,389 Jews.

===== Pre-1914 and present-day situation =====
There were Lithuanian speakers and the Lithuanian language was effective throughout Lithuania Minor at the beginning of the 20th century, though the concentration places of Lithuanians were near Neman – Klaipėda, Tilžė (Tilsit), Ragainė (Ragnit). At the end of the war, the German and Lithuanian population of the former East Prussia either fled or was expelled to the western parts of Germany. There resided about 170,000 Prussian Lithuanians in East Prussia previous to 1914. Lithuanian fellowships functioned in Gumbinė, Įsrutis, Koenigsberg, Lithuanian press was printed in Geldapė, Darkiemis, Girdava, Stalupėnai, Eitkūnai, Gumbinė, Pilkalnis, Jurbarkas, Vėluva, Tepliava, Labguva, Koenigsberg, Žuvininkai.

No Germanization was performed in Lithuania Minor prior to 1873. Prussian Lithuanians were affected voluntarily by German culture. In the 20th century, a good number of Lithuanian speakers considered themselves to be Memellandish and also Germans. In 1914, Lithuanian representatives made their first steps to claim Minor Lithuania by signing the Amber Declaration, which called for the unification of ethnic Lithuanian lands. In the interbellum, after the division of Lithuania Minor between Germany and Lithuania, Lithuania started a campaign of Lithuanisation in its acquired region, the Klaipėda Region. In the regional census of 1925, more than 26 percent declared themselves Lithuanian and more than 24 percent simply as Memellandish, compared with more than 41 percent German. The election results to the Parliament of the Klaipėda Region (Lithuanian: Seimelis, German: Landtag) between 1923 and 1939 revealed approximately 85 percent votes for German political parties and about 15 percent for national Lithuanian parties.

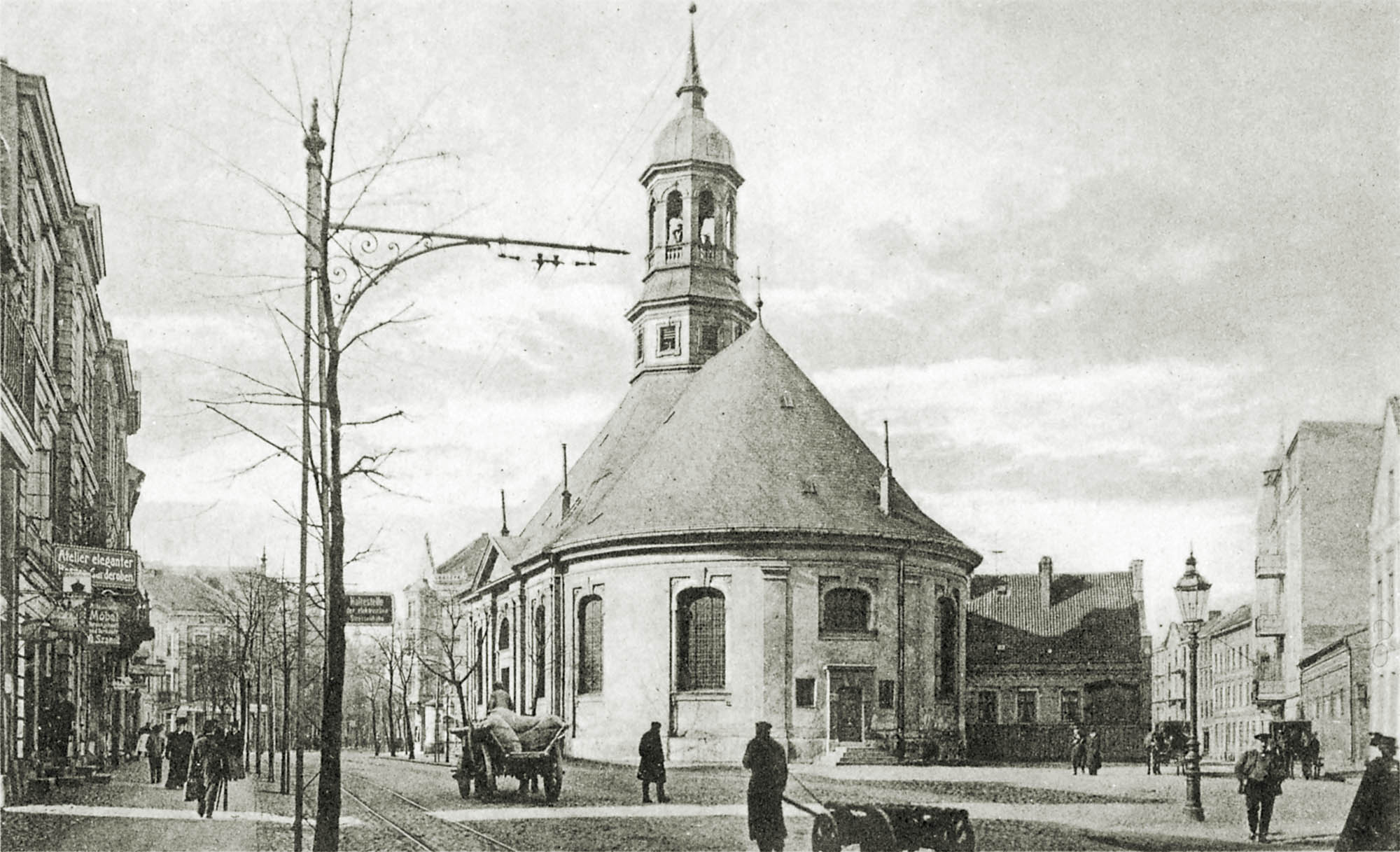
Early 20th-century view of the Lithuanian Church in Tilsit

The former language of Lietuvninkai (which is very similar to standard Lithuanian) is currently spoken and known by only about several hundred people who were sometime residents of Lithuania Minor. Almost all former Prussian Lithuanians – including Lithuanian speakers – had already identified themselves with German speakers, or Prussians, by the end of the 19th century because of the influence of German culture and attitudes of the residents of East Prussia, which had been in quick progress during the 19th century. The majority of the Lietuvininkai population has migrated to Germany, together with Germans and now lives there.

Prussian Lithuanians spoke in western Aukštaitian dialect, those living by the Curonian lagoon spoke in the so-called "Curonianating" (Samogitian "donininkai" subdialect; there are three Samogitian dialects where Lithuanian "duona" (a bread) is said dūna, dona and douna) subdialect, and small part of them spoke in Dzūkian dialect. Prussian Lithuanians never called themselves and their own language Samogitian.

==== Old Prussians ====
Prussians were the native and main inhabitants of the lands which later became the core lands of the Teutonic Order. After conquest and conversion to Christianity, the Prussian nobility became vassals of the Order and Germanized. The officers of the Order ceased to speak in Prussian with local inhabitants in 1309. After the extinction of the Order and the spread of the Reformation of the church, the lot of Prussians became somewhat better. Three Reformed catechisms in the Prussian language were published between 1545 and 1561.

Lithuanians and ethnic Prussians made up the majority of inhabitants, and Prussian villagers tended to be assimilated as Lithuanians. The case of Jonas Bretkūnas illustrates the phenomenon of Prussian-Lithuanian bilingualism. The last Prussian speakers disappeared around the end of the 17th century.

==== Germans ====
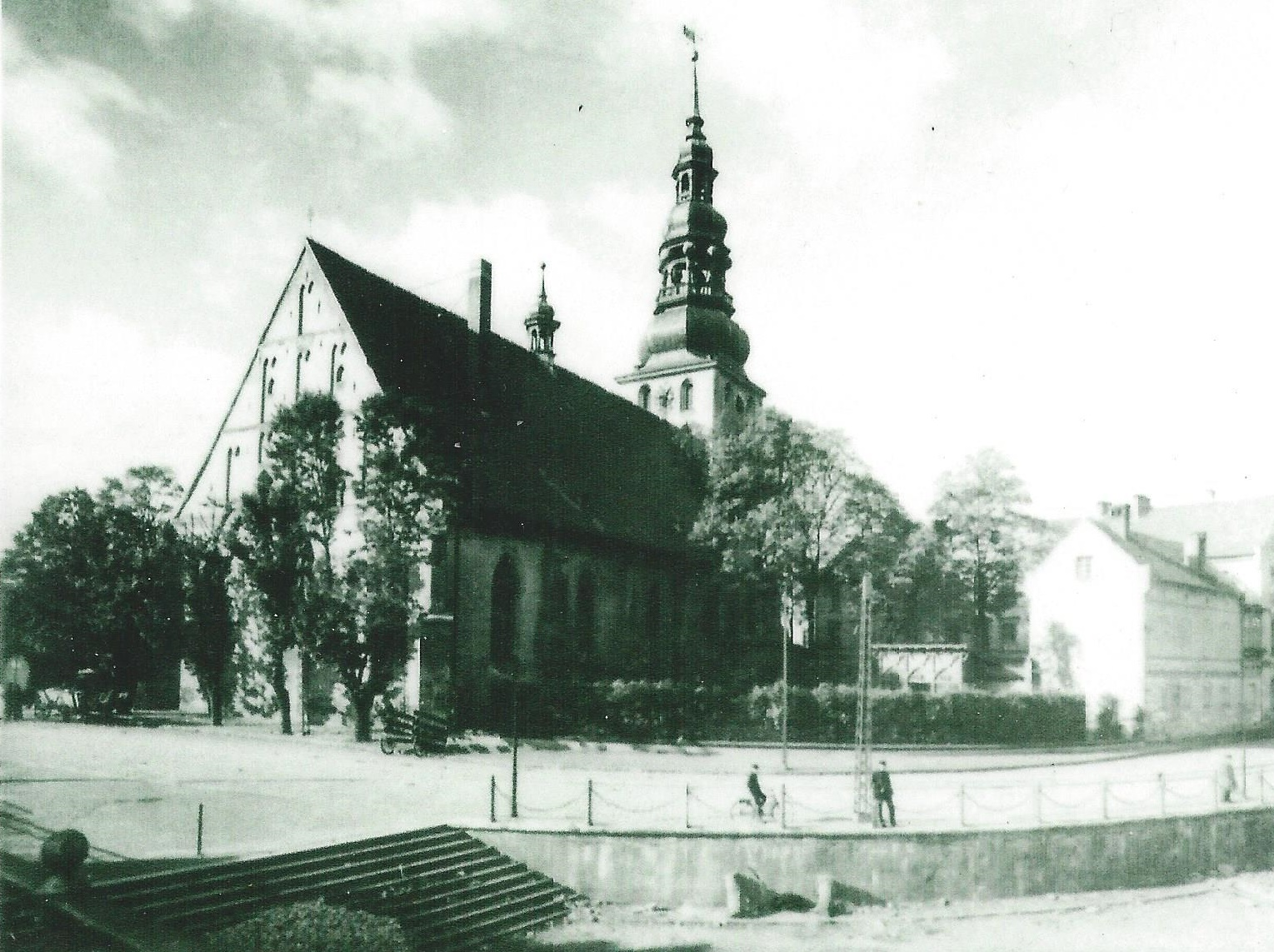
German Church in Tilsit, c. 1900

The percentage of Germans in Lithuania Minor was low prior to 1709–1711. With German colonization and Germanization policies, the ethnic composition changed. During and after World War II, the German population was either evacuated westwards by Nazi Germany or expelled by the Soviet Union.

==== Poles ====
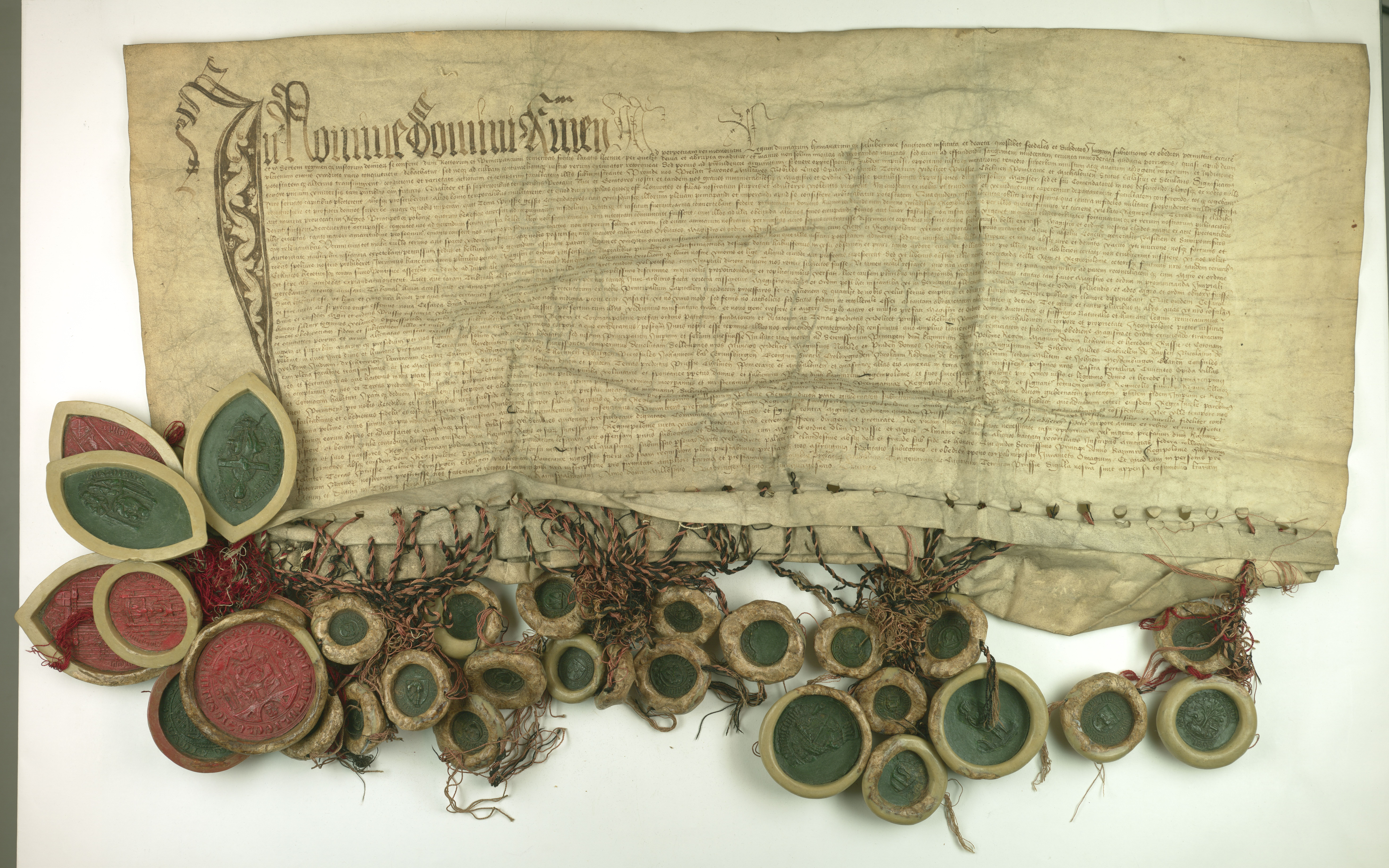
Act of incorporation of the region into the Kingdom of Poland, 1454

The Darkehmen (Polish: Darkiejmy, now Ozyorsk) and Gołdap counties, as transitional counties between Lithuania Minor and the Masuria region to the south, were inhabited by notable numbers of both Poles and Lithuanians, with Polish-founded villages including Kazachye (Piątki), Nekrasovo (Karpowo Wielkie), Maltsevo (Karpówko) and Kochkino (Popówko). There were instances of Polish noble families living in the region, e.g. the Kręckis in Brasnicken, Przeciszewskis in Kazikėnai, Kozickis in Lenkehlischken (Lenkeliszki), Doręgowskis and Pierzchas in Moritzkehmen, Metalskis in Mehlkehmen (Melkiejmy), and Repkas in Tilsewischken.

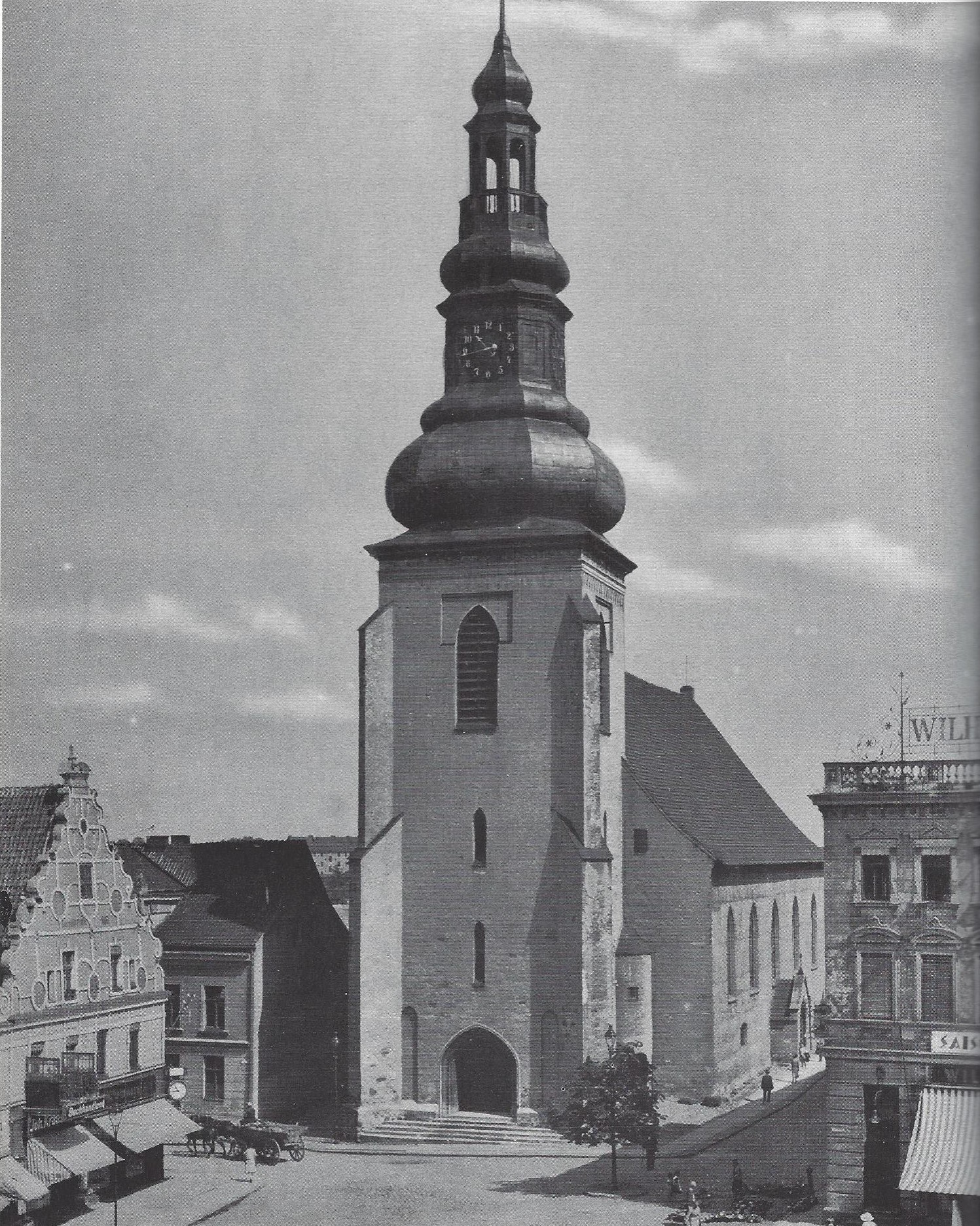
The Lutheran Church in Insterburg (Wystruć) hosted Polish-language services in the 17th century

From 1724, new Polish settlement in Lithuania Minor was banned by Frederick William I of Prussia. Despite this, according to Prussian data from 1825, Poles still lived in the more northern counties of the region, with the most numerous Polish populations located in the Tilsit (Polish: Tylża, now Sovetsk) and Stallupönen (Polish: Stołupiany, now Nesterov) counties. Following the unsuccessful November Uprising, Polish insurgents were interned in the region (notably in Tilsit and Insterburg (Polish: Wystruć, now Chernyakhovsk)) in 1832. During the Polish January Uprising in the Russian Partition of Poland, there were secret Polish organizations in Insterburg (Wystruć) and Tilsit (Tylża), which smuggled weapons for the insurgents. A Polish consular post and consulate was based in Klaipėda in the interbellum, and once again from 2004.

During World War II, Poles formed the majority of the prisoners of the Hohenbruch concentration camp at modern Gromovo (Laukny), Polish prisoners of war were among the prisoners of the Stalag I-C and Stalag Luft VI POW camps, and Polish civilians were also enslaved as forced labour in the region (in the vicinity of Klaipėda and Tilsit). The Polish resistance was active and operated one of the region's main smuggling points for Polish underground press near Klaipėda, and a branch of the Peasant Battalions in Insterburg (Wystruć).

==== French and French-speaking Swiss ====
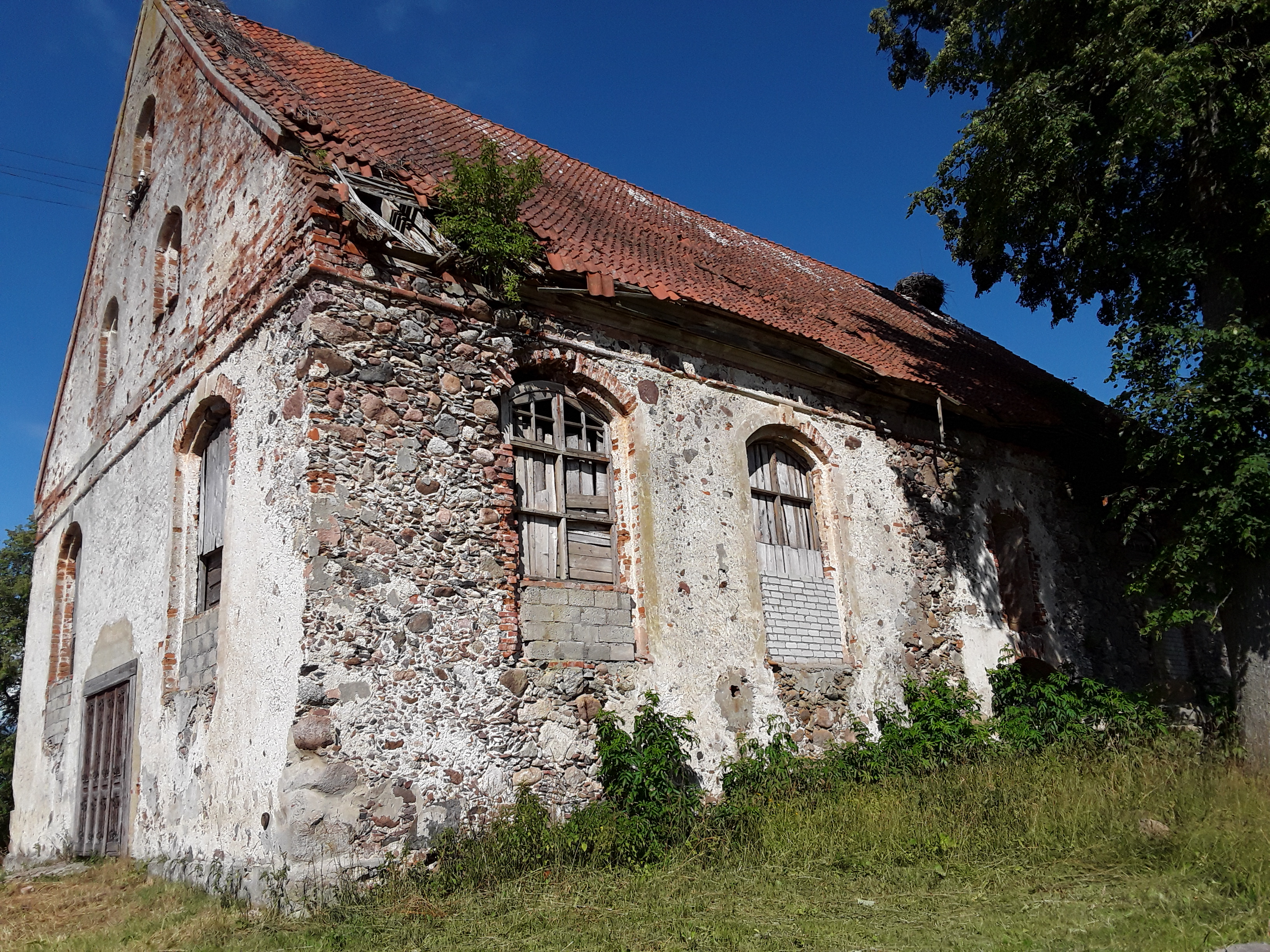
Ruined church in Telmanovo (Didlaukiai), resting place of Pierre de la Cave, French immigrant and general in the service of Brandenburg

Calvinist immigrants of French and Swiss origin settled in the region following the Great Northern War plague of 1709–1711. 40 villages around Gumbinnen (Lithuanian: Gumbinė, now Gusev) were settled by French-speaking Swiss immigrants, and also some 350 descendants of French Huguenot immigrants to the Uckermark moved to the area. In the 18th century, French Reformed congregations were founded in Gumbinnen and Judtschen (Lithuanian: Jučiai, now Veselovka), and French-language Reformed church services were also held in Insterburg (Lithuanian: Įsrutis, now Chernyakhovsk) and Sadweitschen (Lithuanian: Sodviečiai, now Pervomayskoye).

=== Germanization ===
The process of Germanization of other ethnic groups was complex. It included direct and indirect Germanization. Old Prussians were welcomed with the same civil rights as Germans after they were converted, while the Old Prussian nobility waited to receive their rights. There were about nine thousand farms left empty after the plague of 1709, remedied by the Great East Colonization. Its final stage was 1736–1756. Germans revived the farms vacated by the plagues. Thus, the percentage of Germans increased to 13.4 percent in Prussian villages as well as in neighboring Lithuania, also stricken by the plague. By 1800, most Prussian Lithuanians were literate and bilingual in Lithuanian and German. There was no forced Germanization before 1873. After Germany was unified in 1871, Prussian Lithuanians were influenced by German culture, leading to the teaching of German in schools—a practice common throughout northern and eastern Europe. The Germanization of Lithuania Minor accelerated in the second half of the 19th century, when German was made compulsory in the education system at all levels, although newspapers and books were freely published and church services were held in the Lithuanian language, even during the Nazi era. At the same time, Lithuanian periodicals were printed in areas not far from Russian-controlled Lithuania, such as Auszra or Varpas, and smuggled into Lithuania proper. Between the two world wars, in the regions lost by Russia following the Treaty of Brest-Litovsk, Russian and Jewish communists printed seditious literature in local languages until 1933.

== Culture ==
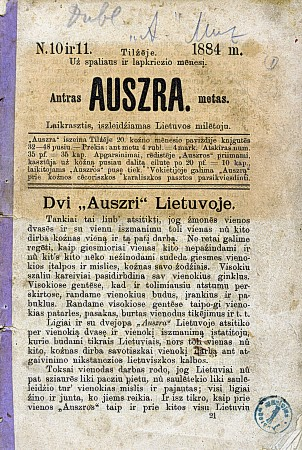
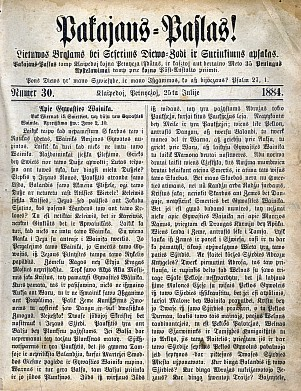
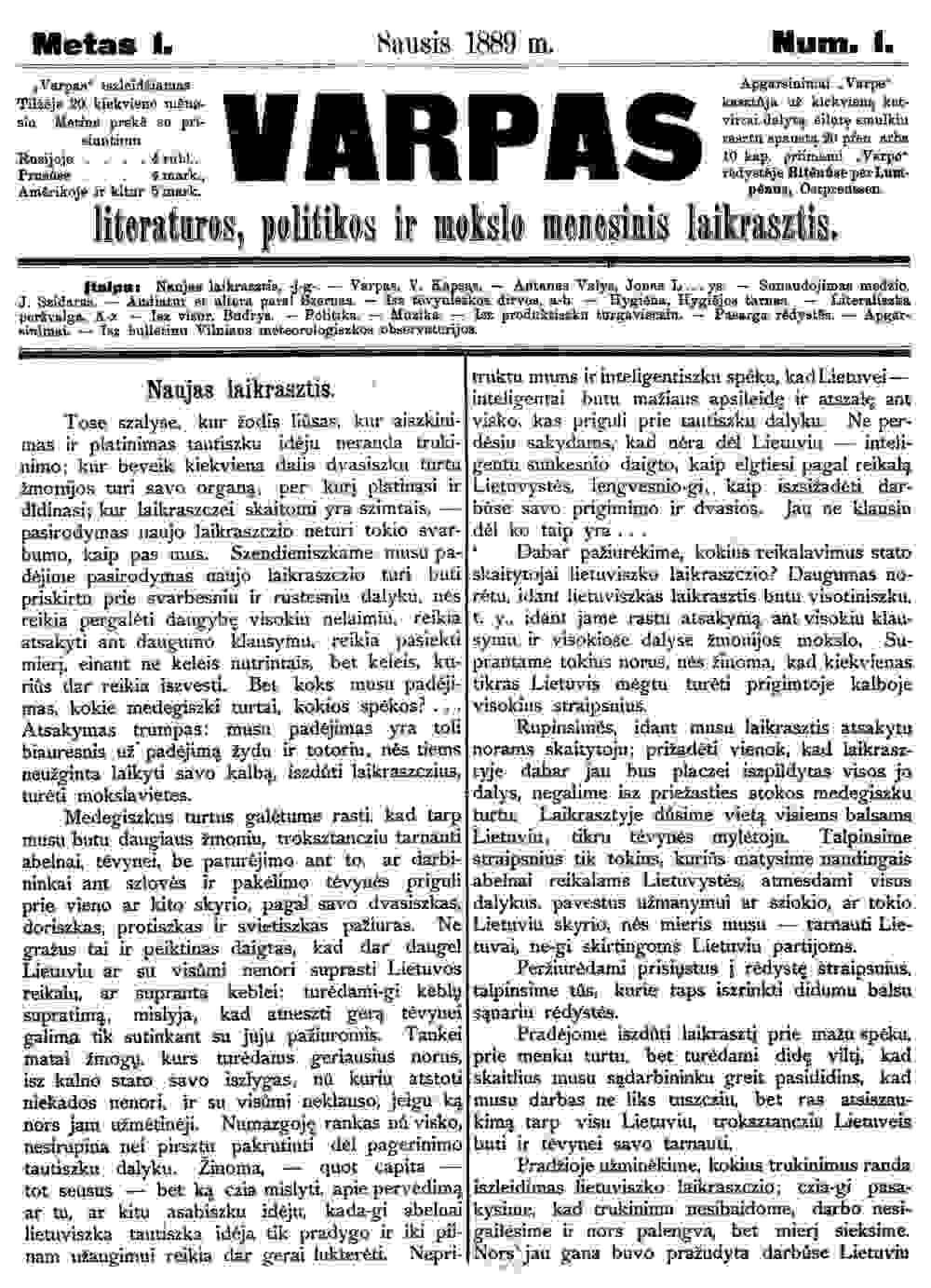
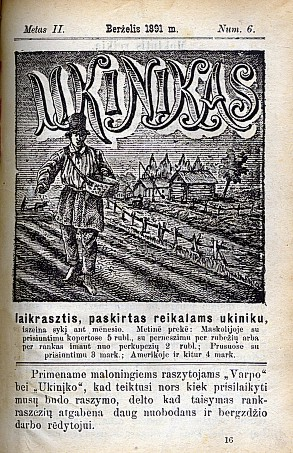
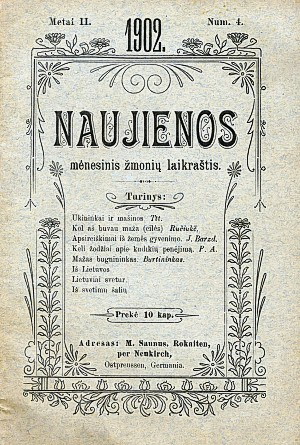
Examples of 19th- and 20th-century Lithuanian newspapers from Lithuania Minor: Auszra, Pakajaus paslas, Varpas, Ūkininkas, Naujienos

The first book in Lithuanian, prepared by Martynas Mažvydas, was printed in Königsberg in 1547, while the first Lithuanian grammar, Daniel Klein's Grammatica Litvanica, was printed there in 1653.

Lithuania Minor was the home of Vydūnas, philosopher and writer, and Kristijonas Donelaitis, pastor and poet and author of The Seasons, which mark the beginning of Lithuanian literature. The Seasons give a vivid depiction of the everyday life of Prussian Lithuanian country.

Lithuania Minor was an important center for Lithuanian culture, which was persecuted in Russian-controlled Lithuania proper. That territory had been slowly Polonized when being part of the Polish–Lithuanian Commonwealth and was heavily Russificied while part of the Russian Empire, especially in the second half of the 19th century. During the ban on Lithuanian printing in Russia from 1864 until 1904, Lithuanian books were printed in East Prussian towns such as Tilsit, Ragnit, Memel, and Königsberg, and smuggled to Russia by knygnešiai. The first Lithuanian language periodicals appeared during the period in Lithuania Minor, such as Auszra, edited by Jonas Basanavičius, succeeded by Varpas by Vincas Kudirka. They had contributed greatly to the Lithuanian national revival of the 19th century.

== See also ==
- Curonian weathervane
- Regions of Lithuania
- Masuria

== Sources ==
- Simon Gunau, Preussische Chronik. Hrsg. von M. Perlbach etc., Leipzig, 1875.
- Adalbert Bezzenberger, Die litauisch-preußische Grenze.- Altpreußische Monatsschrift, XIX–XX, 1882–1883.
- K. Lohmeyer, Geschichte von Ost- und Westpreußen, Gotha, 1908
- R. Trautmann, Die Altpreußischen Sprachdenkmaler, Göttingen, 1909
- L. David. Preussische Chronik. Hrsg. von Hennig, Königsberg, 1812
- M. Toeppen, Historische-comparative Geographie von Preußen, Gotha, 1958
