= Gromovo, Kaliningrad Oblast =

Settlement in Kaliningrad Oblast

Gromovo Громово
- Rural locality
- Interactive map of Gromovo
- Location of Gromovo Gromovo (European Russia) Gromovo (Russia)
- Coordinates: 54°58′N 21°25′E
- Country: Russia
- Federal subject: Kaliningrad Oblast
- Administrative district: Slavsky District

Population
  - Estimate (2010): 423 )
- Time zone: UTC+2 (MSK–1)
- Postal code: 238604
- OKTMO ID: 27727000151

Gromovo (Russian: Громово; Polish: Laukny; Lithuanian: Lauknos) is a rural locality in Slavsky District of Kaliningrad Oblast, Russia. It is located in the region of Lithuania Minor. It has a population of 423 (2010 census).

== History ==
In the late 19th century it had a population of 600, entirely Lithuanian-speaking.

Under Nazi Germany, it was renamed Hohenbruch to erase traces of Lithuanian origin. Near the village Nazi Germany operated the Hohenbruch concentration camp, mostly for Polish prisoners (see also Nazi crimes against the Polish nation). There is a memorial with Polish and Russian inscriptions at the location.
