= Ulyanovo, Kaliningrad Oblast =

Settlement in Kaliningrad Oblast

Ulyanovo Ульяново
- Rural locality
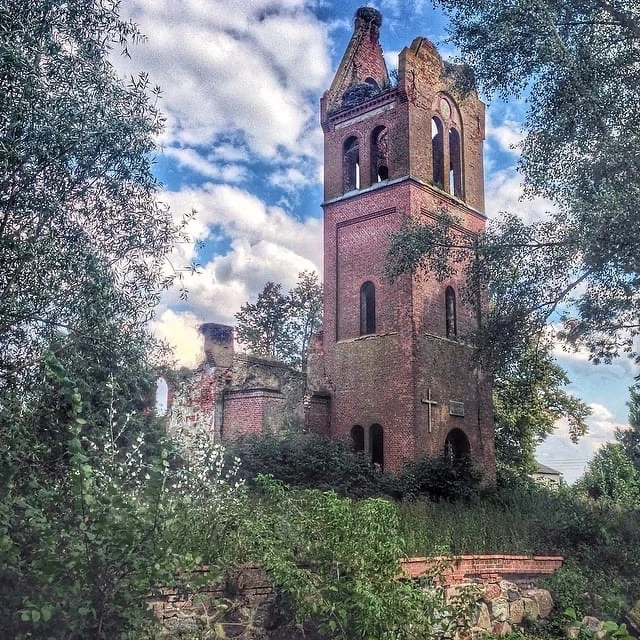
- Old church ruins
- Interactive map of Ulyanovo
- Location of Ulyanovo Ulyanovo (European Russia) Ulyanovo (Russia)
- Coordinates: 54°50′N 22°5′E
- Country: Russia
- Federal subject: Kaliningrad Oblast
- First mentioned: 1352
- Elevation: 30 m (98 ft)

Population
  - Estimate (2010): 607 )
- Time zone: UTC+2 (MSK–1)
- Postal code: 238716
- OKTMO ID: 27714000331

Ulyanovo (Russian: Ульяново; Polish: Krupyszki; Lithuanian: Kraupiškas) is a rural locality in Nemansky District of Kaliningrad Oblast, Russia. It is located in the region of Lithuania Minor. It has a population of 607 (2010 census);

== History ==
The village was first mentioned in 1352. Lithuanian church services were held at the local church. Three annual cattle and horse fairs were held in the settlement in the late 19th century.

Under Nazi Germany, the village was renamed Breitenstein to erase traces of Lithuanian origin.
