= National symbols of Lithuania =

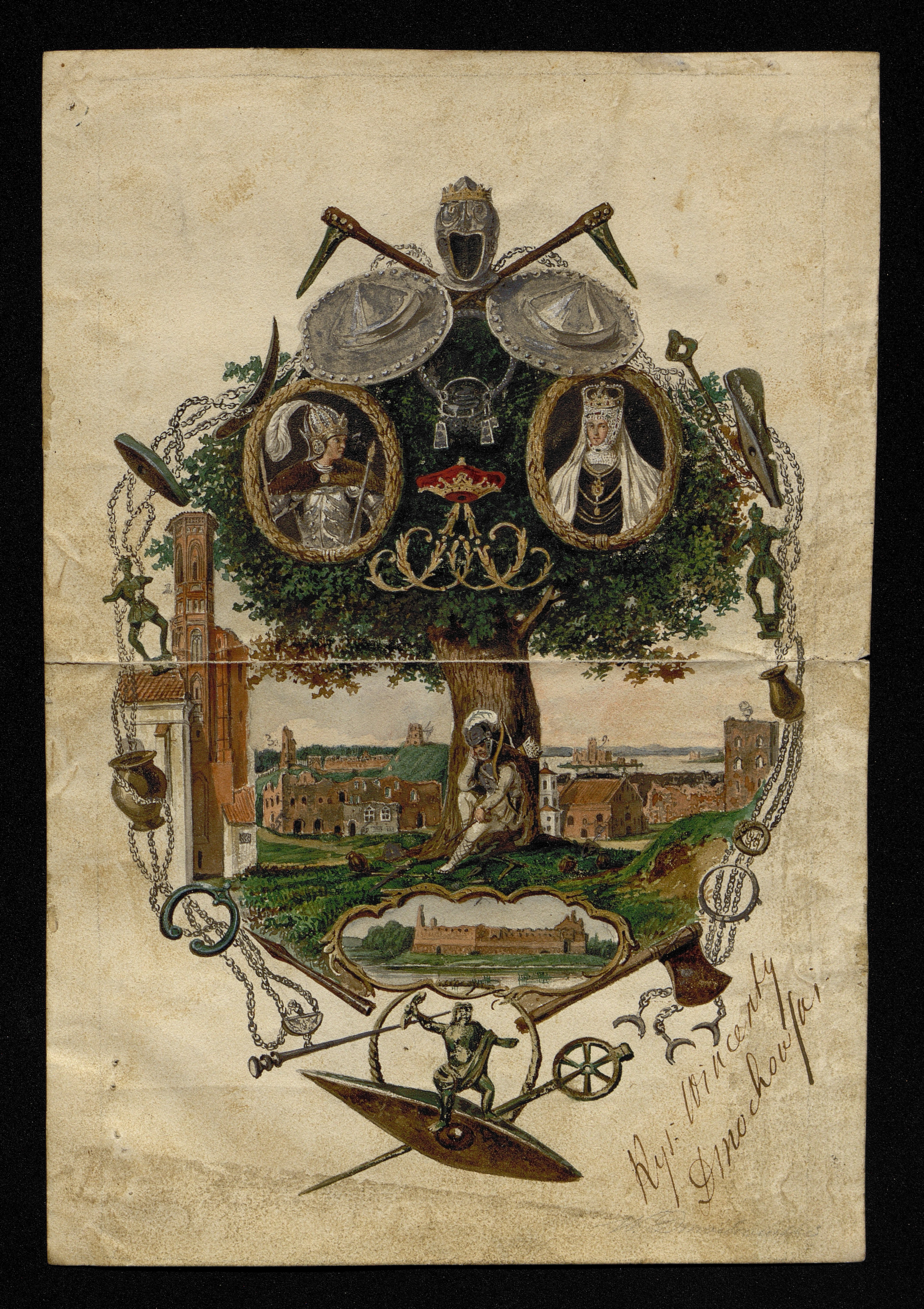
Allegory of Lithuania by Wincenty Dmochowski. The painted title card depicts various artifacts, symbols and monuments of Lithuanian history.

The national symbols of Lithuania are used in Lithuania and abroad to represent the country and its people, history, culture, and nature. These symbols are seen in official capacities, such as flags, coats of arms, postage stamps, and currency, and in URLs. They appear less formally as recurring themes in literature, art and folk art, heraldry, monuments, clothing, personal decoration, and as the names of parks, bridges, streets, and clubs. The less formal manifestations may be classified as national emblems.

Some of the symbols are more heavily weighted with meaning than others. For instance, during the Soviet occupation of Lithuania, the Lithuanian flag and the national anthem were replaced; the Lithuanian Coat of Arms was not shown in official capacities. On the other hand, in keeping with the Soviet policy of encouraging what were seen as harmless expressions of ethnic identity, Lithuanian national costumes were often featured on postal stamps and elsewhere.

Lithuania was occupied by Soviet Union in 1940–1941, later it was controlled by the Nazi government during World War II and was a Soviet Socialist Republic from 1944 until 1990. The latter situation is generally seen by Lithuanians as an occupation. Public displays of both the Nazi swastika and the hammer and sickle were banned in 2008.

== Official symbols ==
=== Flag ===
The flag of Lithuania

The flag was officially designated in 1918, and was re-instituted in 1988. Yellow represents the sun, light, and goodness, green symbolizes the beauty of nature, freedom, and hope, and red stands for the land, courage, and the blood spilled for Lithuania. The colors of the flag also appear in clothing, URLs, and team uniforms.

Lithuanian law states that the flag should be hoisted on historical holidays such as February 16 (marking the re-establishment of the State of Lithuania in 1918), March 11 (commemorating the re-establishment of Lithuania's independence in 1990), July 6 (marking the coronation of Mindaugas as King of Lithuania), July 15 (marking the Battle of Grunwald), October 25 (Constitution Day), and near historically significant buildings such as the Presidential Palace.

=== Coat of arms ===
The coat of arms of Lithuania

The state emblem of the Republic of Lithuania is Vytis (the white knight). The heraldic shield features a red field with an armoured knight on a white horse holding a silver sword aloft in his right hand.

The charging knight is known to have been first used as the state emblem in 1366 on the seal of Algirdas, Grand Duke of Lithuania. The earliest coins featuring Vytis date from the second half of the 14th century. Vytis is engraved on all current Lithuanian coins, is displayed on many Lithuanian postage stamps and official documents, and is part of the URL of official Lithuanian websites.

Former United States NFL player Joe Jurevicius bears a Vytis prominently tattooed on his arm as a symbol of his Lithuanian ancestry.

=== National Anthem ===
"Tautiška giesmė" is the national anthem of Lithuania. The music and lyrics were written in 1898 by Vincas Kudirka. The song was first publicly performed in Vilnius in 1905, and became the official national anthem in 1919. It was replaced by another national anthem during the Soviet era, and was reinstated in 1992 when the new constitution was ratified. Lietuva brangi (Precious Lithuania), written by the poet Maironis, is another important song sometimes called the unofficial national anthem.

== Founding fathers ==
Gediminas and Mindaugas are generally regarded as the founding fathers of Lithuania. Gediminas was said to have had a dream which led to the founding of Vilnius, the capital of Lithuania; in this dream, an iron wolf howled all night near the site of the present-day Gediminas Tower. A seer interpreted this as meaning that a great city should be built there. "What is destined for the ruler and the state of Lithuania, let it be: the iron wolf means a castle and a town which will be established by the ruler on this site. The town will be the capital of the Lithuanian lands and the dwelling of rulers and the glory of their deeds shall echo throughout the world". Mindaugas was the first king of Lithuania, crowned in 1253.

The Columns of Gediminas have been dated to the 14th century. They were often drawn on walls and fences as protest against the Soviet occupation. EuroBasket 2011, which was held in Lithuania, used a modified version of the columns in its logo. Gediminas is a frequently used street name, most notably Gediminas Avenue in Vilnius. Mindaugas and Gediminas are popular first names for men in Lithuania.

During the period of Vytautas the Great, Lithuania reached the biggest extension of its territory. Victory in Battle of Grunwald of 1410 (known as Battle of Žalgiris in Lithuanian) with Polish coalition became a turning point of Lithuanian history, establishing a permanent western border. During the Interwar period of Lithuania, Vytautas was regarded as the greatest ruler in Lithuanian history and 1930 was officially declared as the Year of Vytautas. Many public events, encouraged by authoritarian regime of President Antanas Smetona were held in 1930, generating a cult of Vytautas.

Columns of Gediminas

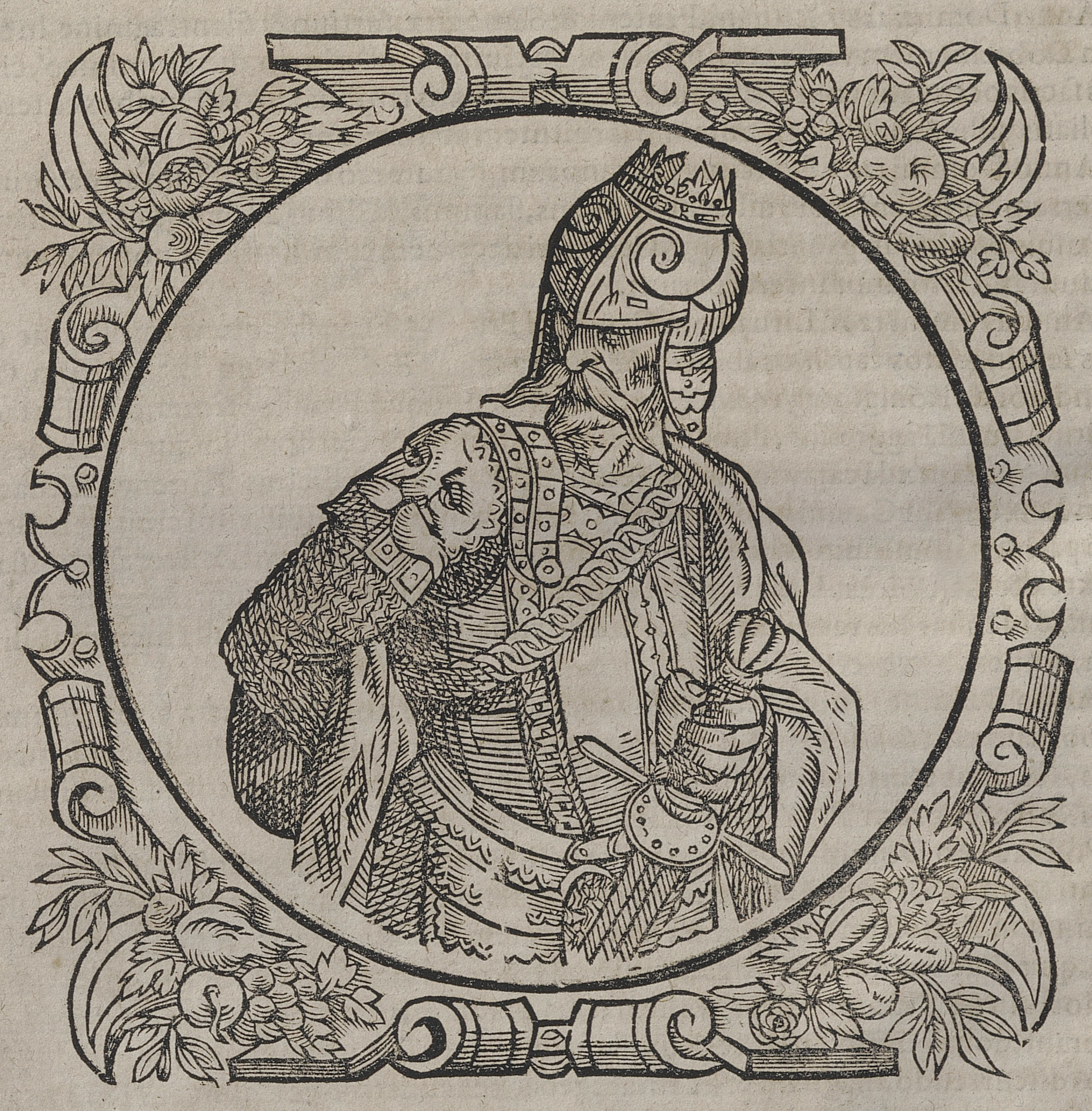
Gediminas, an imaginary portrait

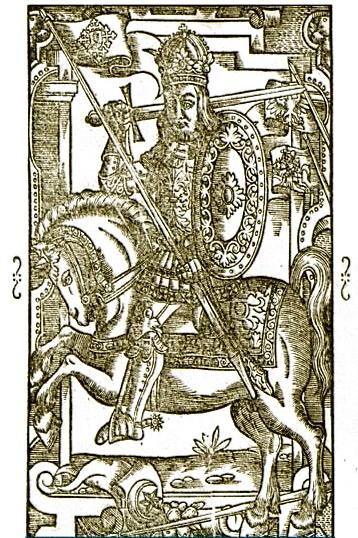
Mindaugas, from a medieval chronicle

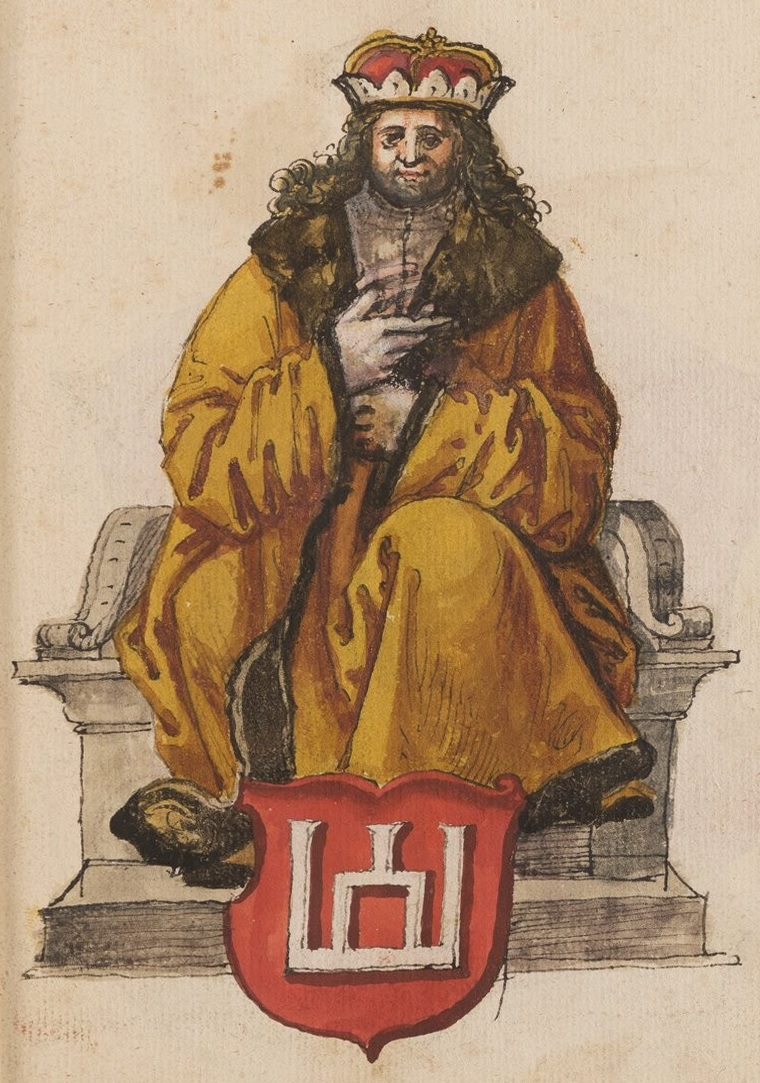
Vytautas the Great with Gediminas' Cap, painted in circa 1555

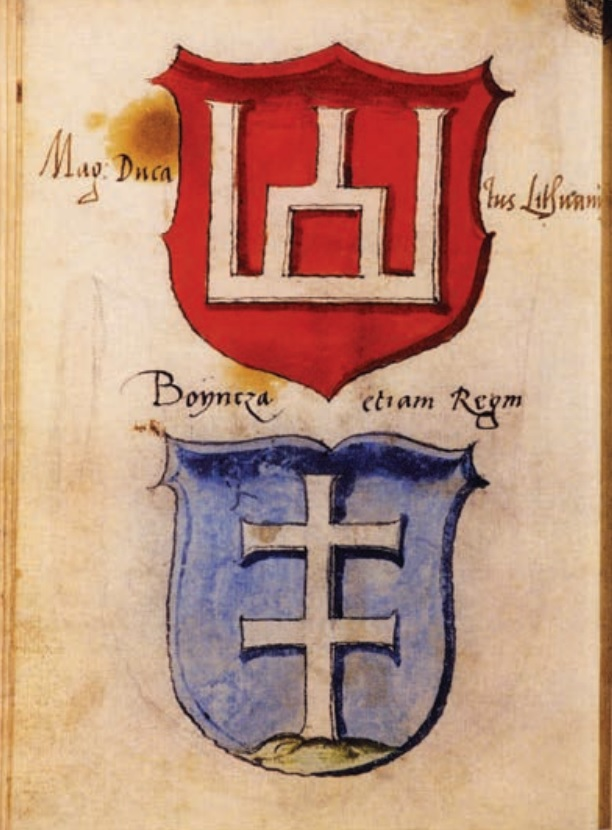
The Columns of Gediminids and the Double Cross of Jogaila, 16th century

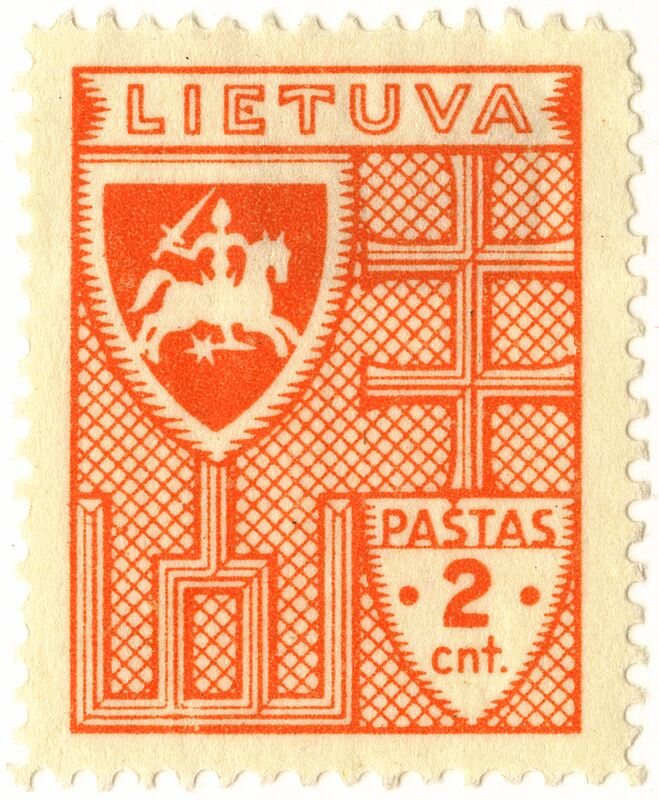
Vytis, the Columns of Gediminids and the Double Cross of Jogaila on a Lithuanian stamp, 1936

== Landmarks ==
The most prominent landmark in Lithuania is probably the medieval Gediminas Tower in Vilnius; it is one of the highest points in the city, and the flag of Lithuania is flown there. During the Soviet occupation, the flag of the Lithuanian Soviet Socialist Republic was displayed there; on October 7, 1988, during the independence movement that was finalized by the Act of the Re-Establishment of the State of Lithuania on March 11, 1990, the Lithuanian tricolor was re-hoisted atop the tower. Other significant landmarks include the Vilnius Castle Complex and its Cathedral Square, Trakai Island Castle and Hill of Crosses; they frequently appear in books, posters, stamps, and tourist brochures.

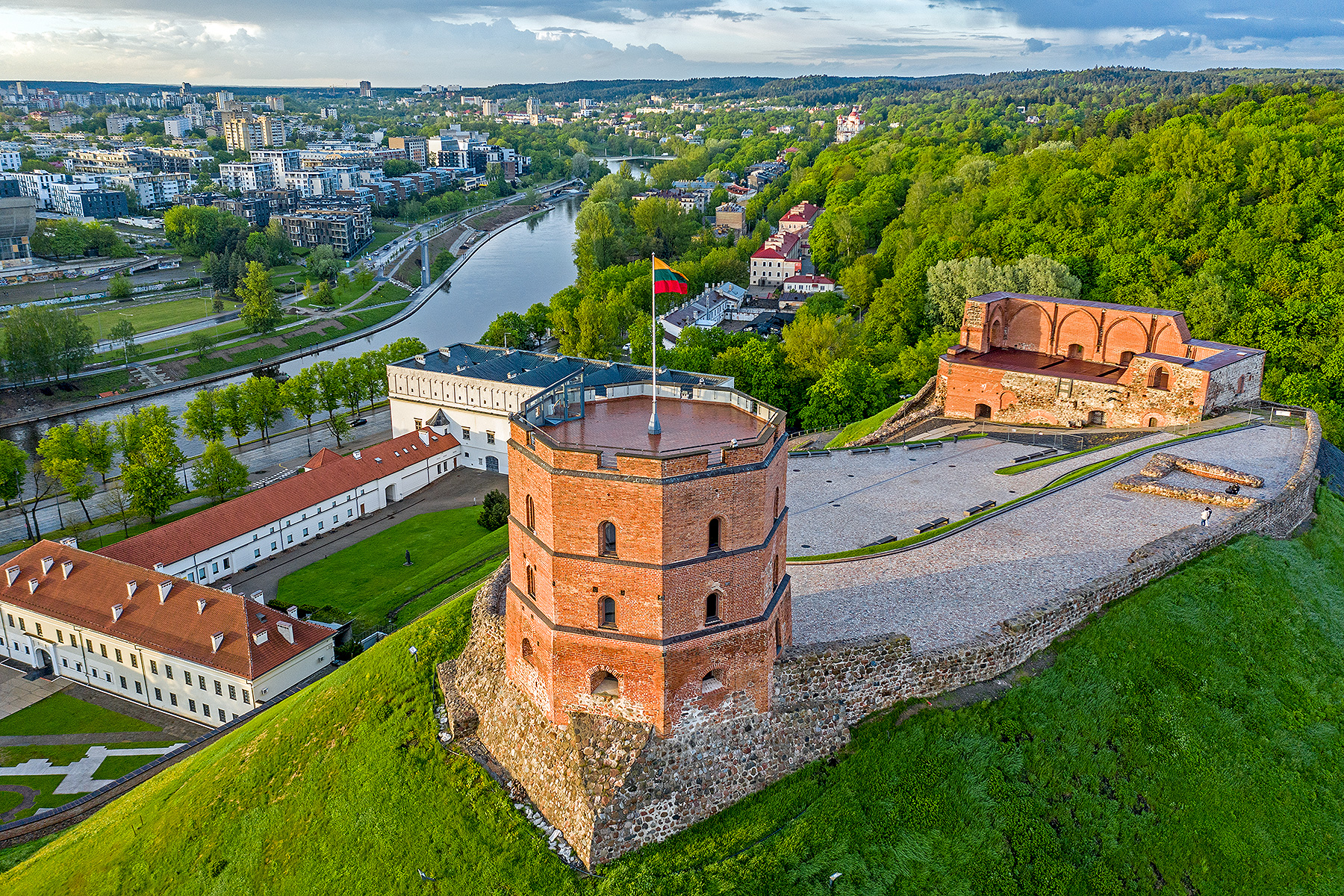
Gediminas Tower in Vilnius

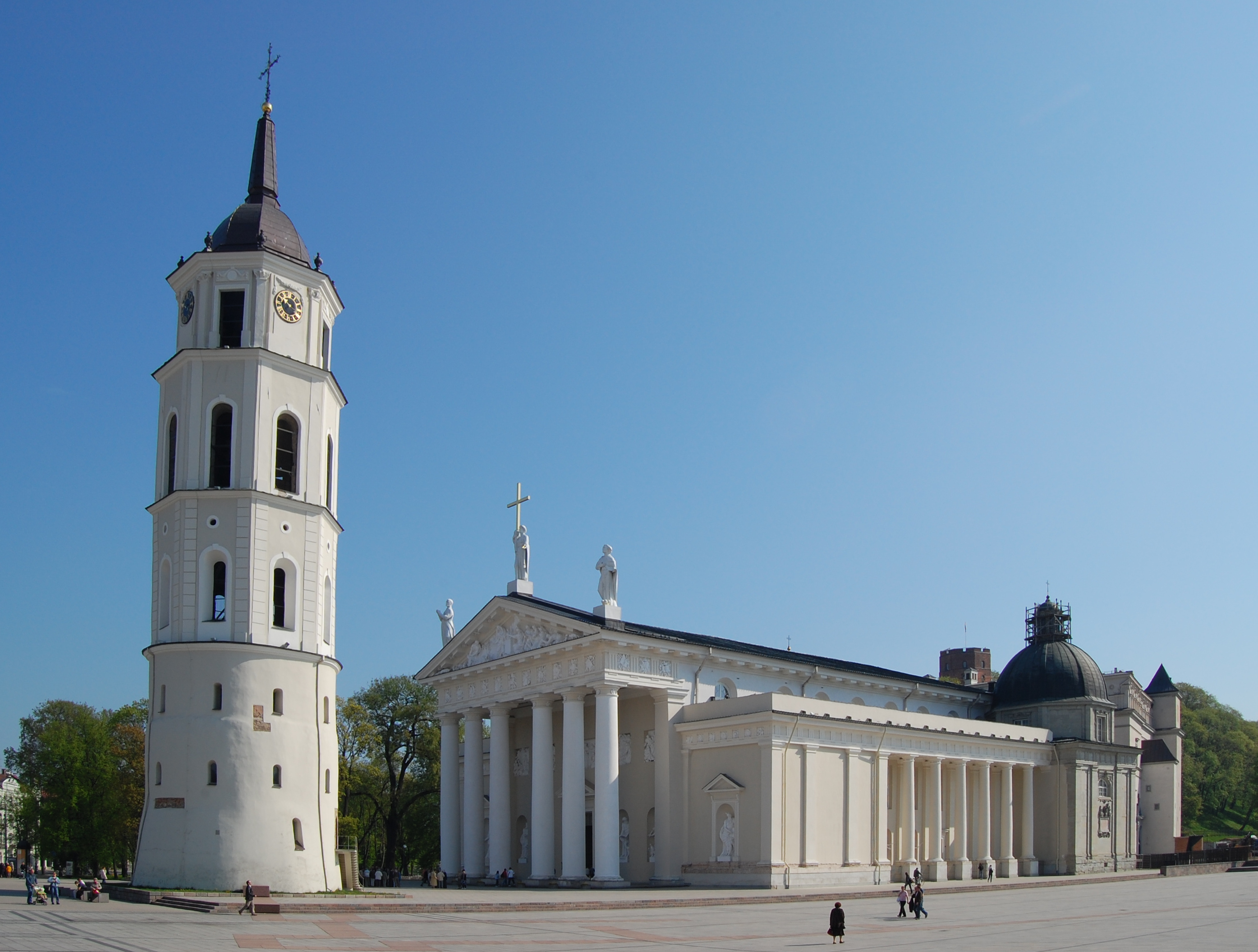
Vilnius Cathedral

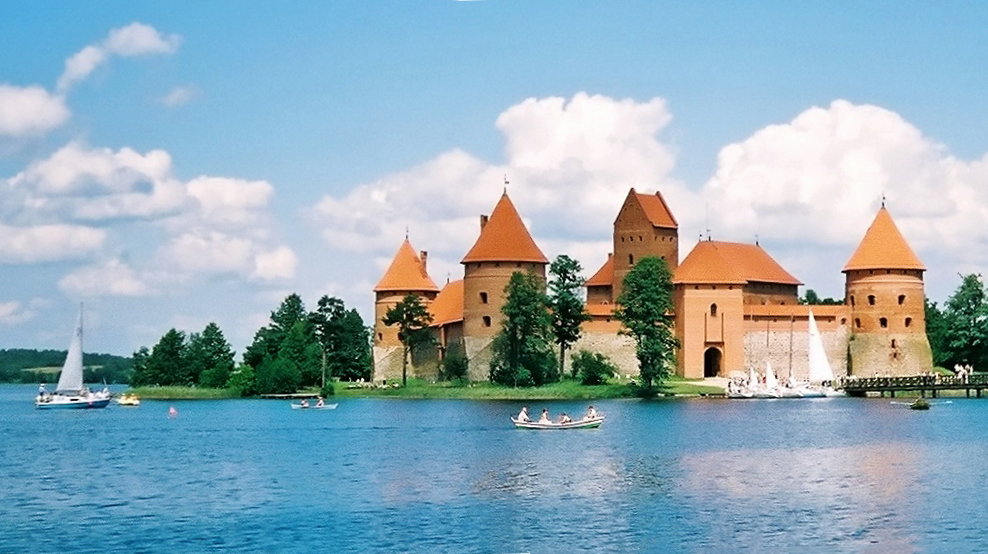
Trakai Island Castle

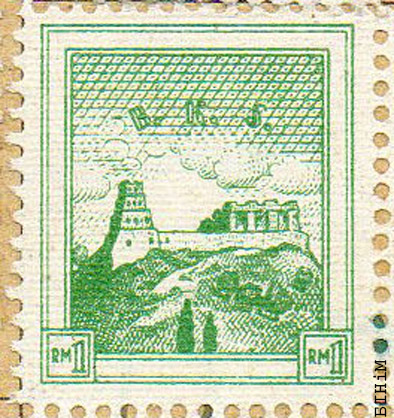
Gediminas Tower on a Belarusian stamp, 1942

== Christian symbols ==
=== Crosses ===
In addition to its formal use in churches, the cross in Lithuania long ago became a frequent subject of folk art. Lietuviškas kryžius is a stylized folk art cross put up at crossroads, in cemeteries, near houses, and as votive offerings in churches. The crosses combine elements of architecture, sculpture, blacksmith art, and painting. They often feature organic flourishes, motifs of the sun, birds, and represent the World Tree. To plead for grace or to express gratitude, the crosses are built as memorials to the dead or as the signs of spiritual protection at certain places. The art of Lithuanian cross crafting was acknowledged as one of the Masterpieces of the Oral and Intangible Heritage of Humanity in 2001 by UNESCO.

A distinctive two-barred cross – the Vytis Cross – appears on the shield held by the knight in Lithuania's coat of arms. Adopted by Grand Duke Jogaila as his personal insignia, it is usually associated with the Jogaila dynasty. This cross is displayed on Lithuanian aircraft. The Order of the Cross of Vytis is a Lithuanian Presidential Award conferred on those who have defended Lithuania's freedom and independence. The Lithuanian Air Force adopted this cross in its roundel and the Special Investigation Service and Lithuanian Riflemen's Union adopted it in the logo.

The Hill of Crosses, containing thousands of crosses of all sizes, is the best known pilgrimage site in Lithuania.

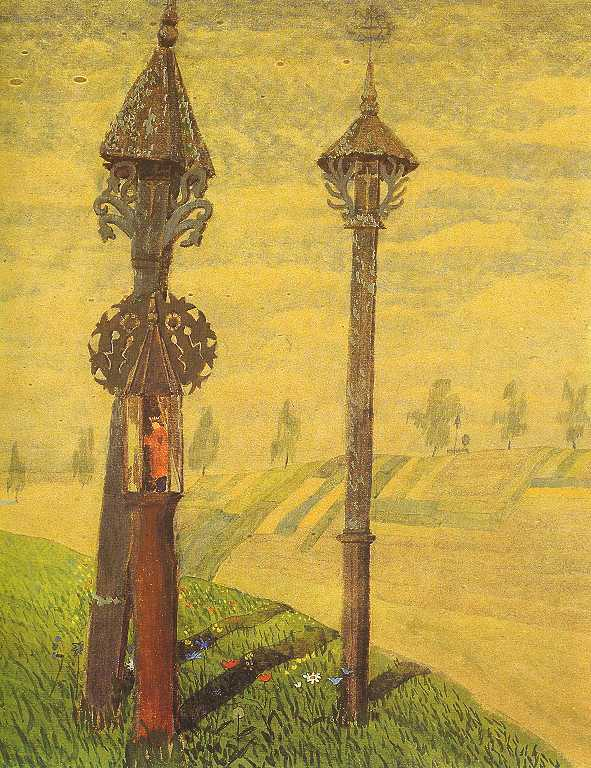
Crosses in Žemaitija, by M.K. Čiurlionis

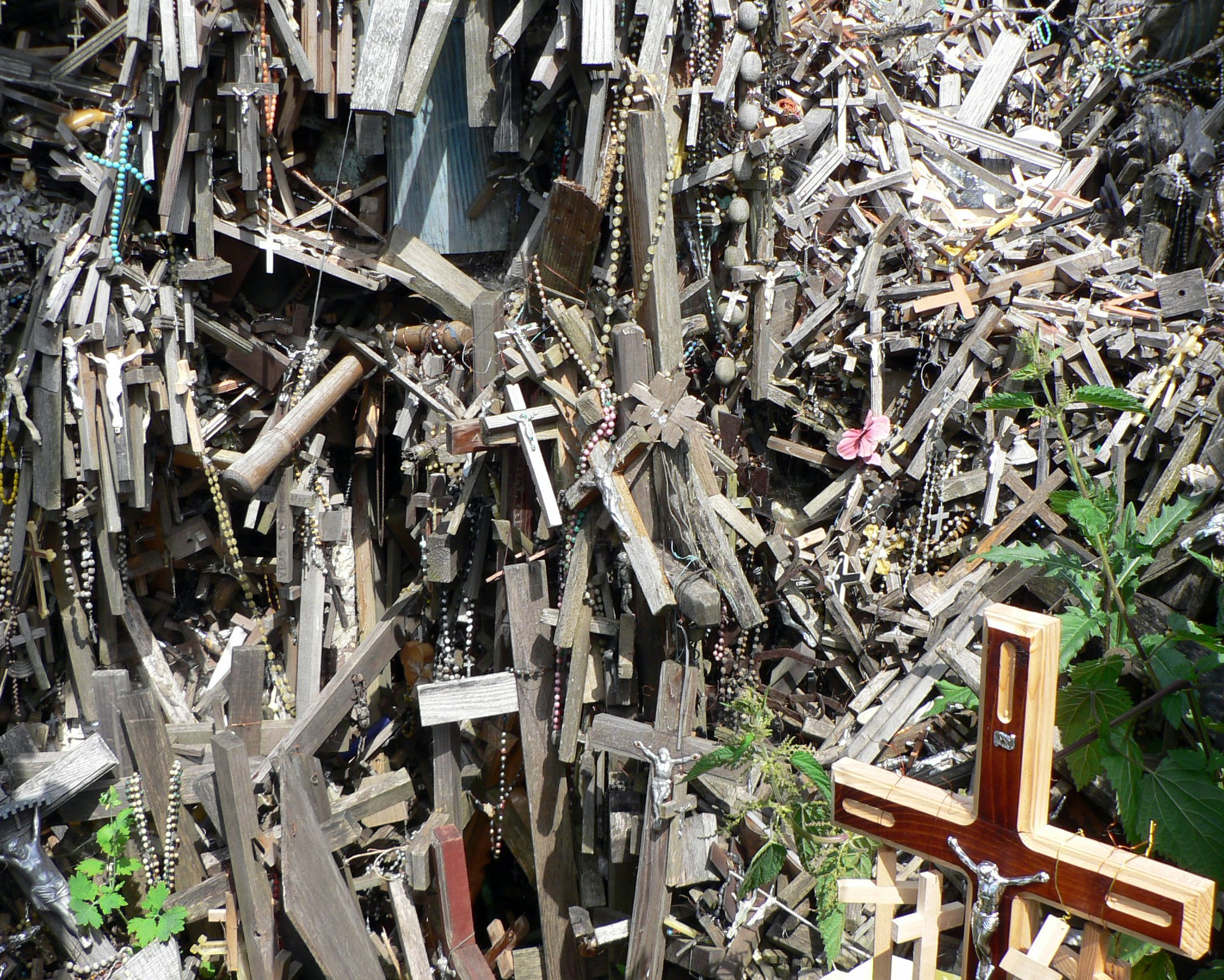
Detail of the Hill of Crosses

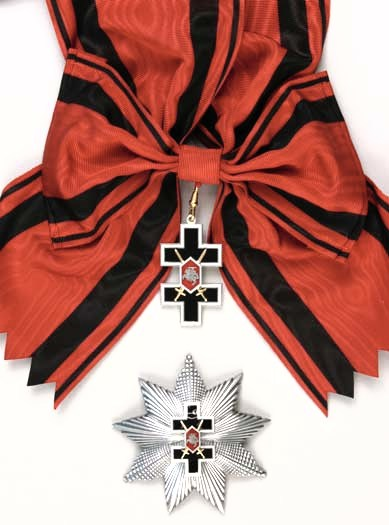
Order of the Cross of Vytis

=== Jesus and saints ===
Wooden carvings of Rūpintojėlis, "The Jesus who cares for us," are often seen at crossroads and in cemeteries. He always rests his head on his right arm, his left hand rests on his knee, a crown of thorns on his head shows drops of blood, and his face is full of solicitude and sorrow.

The pose may represent Jesus' anticipation of his crucifixion, after his scourging and crowning with thorns. It is also said to depict Jesus after his resurrection and before his ascension. One legend has it that Jesus traveled throughout the world wearing his crown of thorns; during his journeys, he sometimes sat on stones near the road and wept.

The patron saint of Lithuania and Poland is Saint Casimir, who is held to have a special affinity for young people; he died in his twenties. His image often appears in stained glass in Lithuanian churches, often holding a lily. Saint Casimir's Day is celebrated on March 4. He was said to have appeared as an apparition in 1518 at the Daugava River during the Muscovite-Lithuanian Wars, encouraging the Lithuanians.

After his death, his relics in Vilnius became a frequent destination of pilgrims; St. Casimir's Fair developed around these pilgrimages, became an annual event, and is still held today.

Other saints who may be seen in coats of arms and elsewhere include Saint George and Saint Christopher.

Saint Casimir

Vilnius COA, with Saint Christopher

Marijampolė COA, with Saint George

== National dress ==
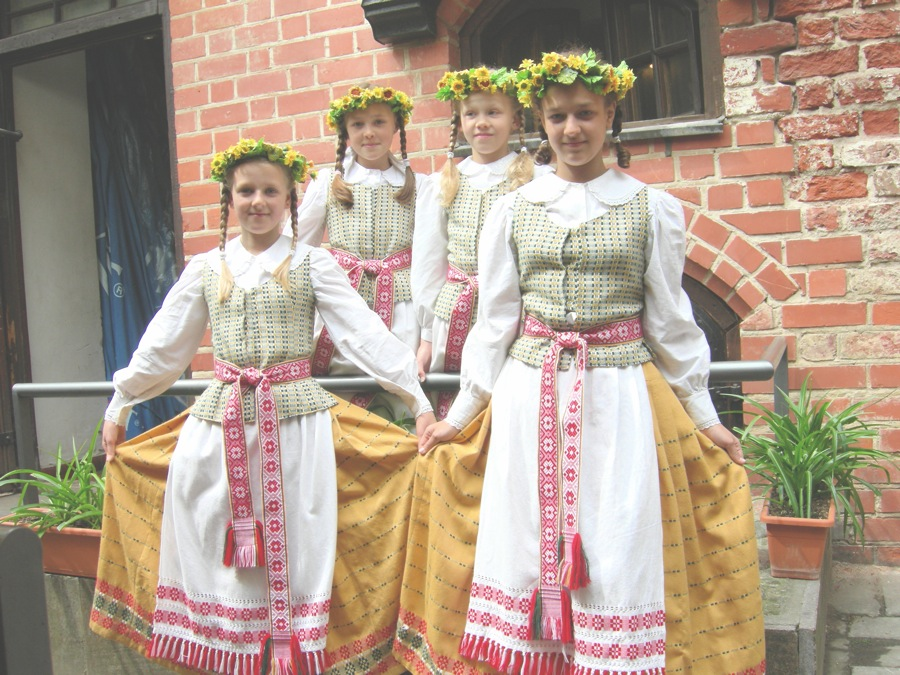
Young girls wearing national dress

Lithuania folk costumes make use of linen weavings in geometric patterns. The full costume is worn only by folk dance groups and the like, but the characteristic fabrics appear in belts, ties, scarves, and other accessories worn on national holidays. Some parts of the folk costume are customary to only particular regions of Lithuania. Delmonas (or dalmonas, plural delmonai) – is a part of women's garb, originated in Lithuania Minor. It is essentially an elaborately decorated purse (outwear pocket), visibly attached to the waist by a waist-band, made out of dark colored velvet, silk, wool or cotton and elaborately embroided with colorful threads and glass beads. This female costume feature represents the Prussian Lithuanians and is not common to other ethnographic regions of Lithuania. In 2019 Delmonai of Lithuania Minor were inscribed into The Intangible Cultural Heritage Inventory of Lithuania as a form of folk art, traditional craftsmanship or agricultural activities.

== Birds and animals ==
The white stork (gandras) was declared the national bird of Lithuania in 1973. Lithuanians believe that storks bring harmony to the families on whose property they nest; they have also kept up the tradition of telling their children that storks bring babies. Stork Day is celebrated on March 25 with various archaic rituals: gifts for children, attributed to the storks, such as fruits, chocolates, pencils, and dyed eggs, are hung on tree branches and fences; snakes are caught, killed and buried under the doorstep; straw fires are lit. Notably, Lithuania is a beneficial and important habitat for these birds: it has the highest known nesting density in the world.

Other birds of note are the common cuckoo (gegutė) – its call is said to sweep away the last traces of winter, and the month of May (gegužės mėnuo) is named for this bird. The rock pigeon (balandis) is commemorated in the month of April (balandžio mėnuo).

Lithuania's special animals include the aurochs, the moose, the wolf (vilkas), and the bear (lokys). According to a popular legend, an iron wolf in Gediminas' dream encouraged the Grand Duke to establish Vilnius and make the city his capital. The Iron Wolf Mechanised Infantry Brigade (motorizuotoji pėstininkų brigada 'Geležinis vilkas') is now the core unit of the Lithuanian Army. The bear is an ancient symbol of Samogitia, one of the regions of Lithuania, and appears in the coat of arms of Šiauliai district. A moose is shown in the Lazdijai district municipality coat of arms and the aurochs is featured in the Kaunas coat of arms.

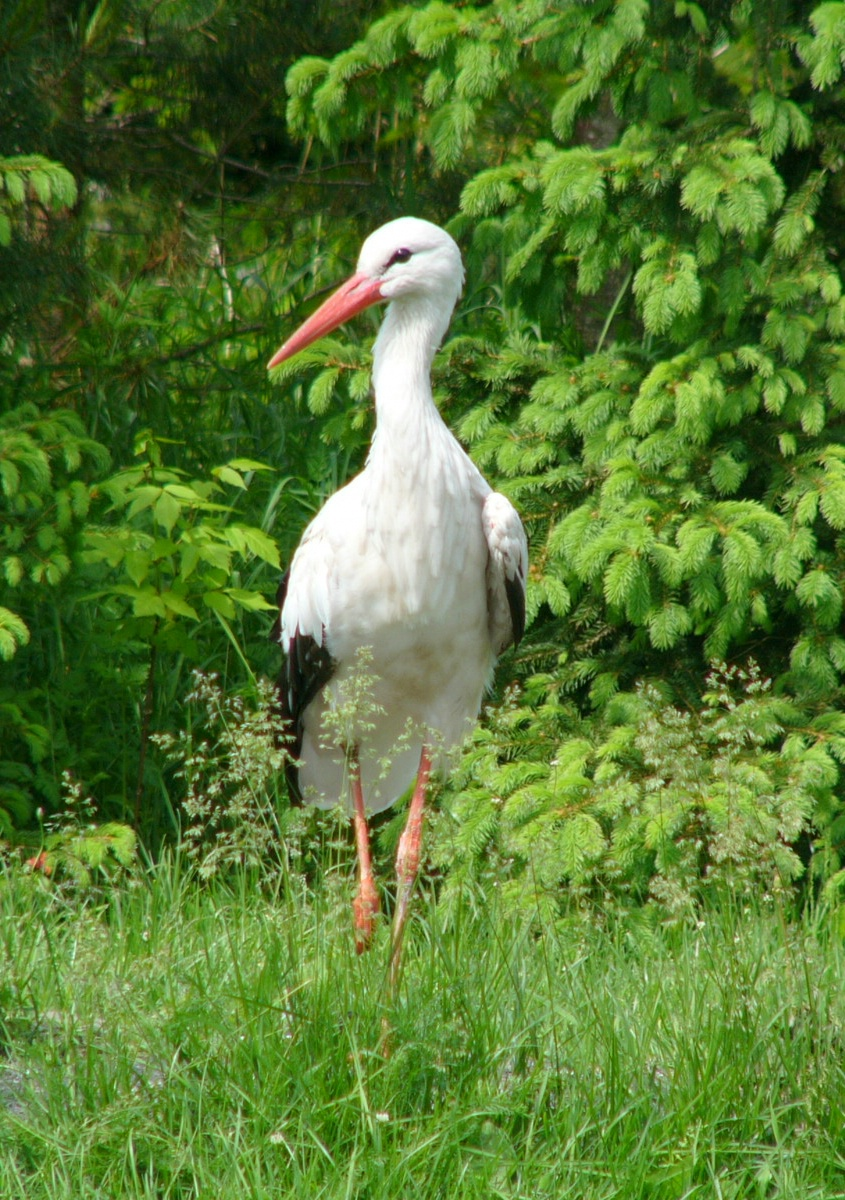
The white stork

The Coat of Arms of Samogitia

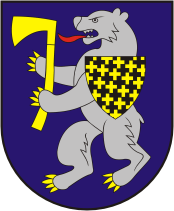
The Coat of Arms of Šiauliai District

The Coat of Arms of Lazdijai

== Trees and plants ==
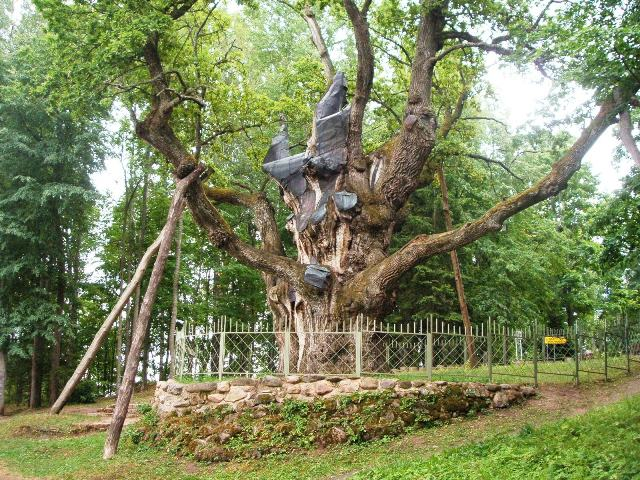
The Stelmužė oak

The national plant is rue (rūta). A bride traditionally wears a little crown made of rue, which is a symbol of maidenhood. During the wedding the crown is burned, symbolizing the loss of careless childhood and entrance into the world of adulthood.

Trees of special significance include oak (ąžuolas), birch (beržas), linden (liepa), and spruce (eglė). A veneration of oak trees comes from pagan times, when they were of religious significance. The Stelmužė Oak, thought to be at least 1,500 years old, is the best-known tree in the country. The significance of trees is reflected in the Lithuanian calendar. The month of June is, in Lithuanian, "birch" (birželio mėnuo), and the month of July is "linden" (liepos mėnuo).

== Other symbols ==
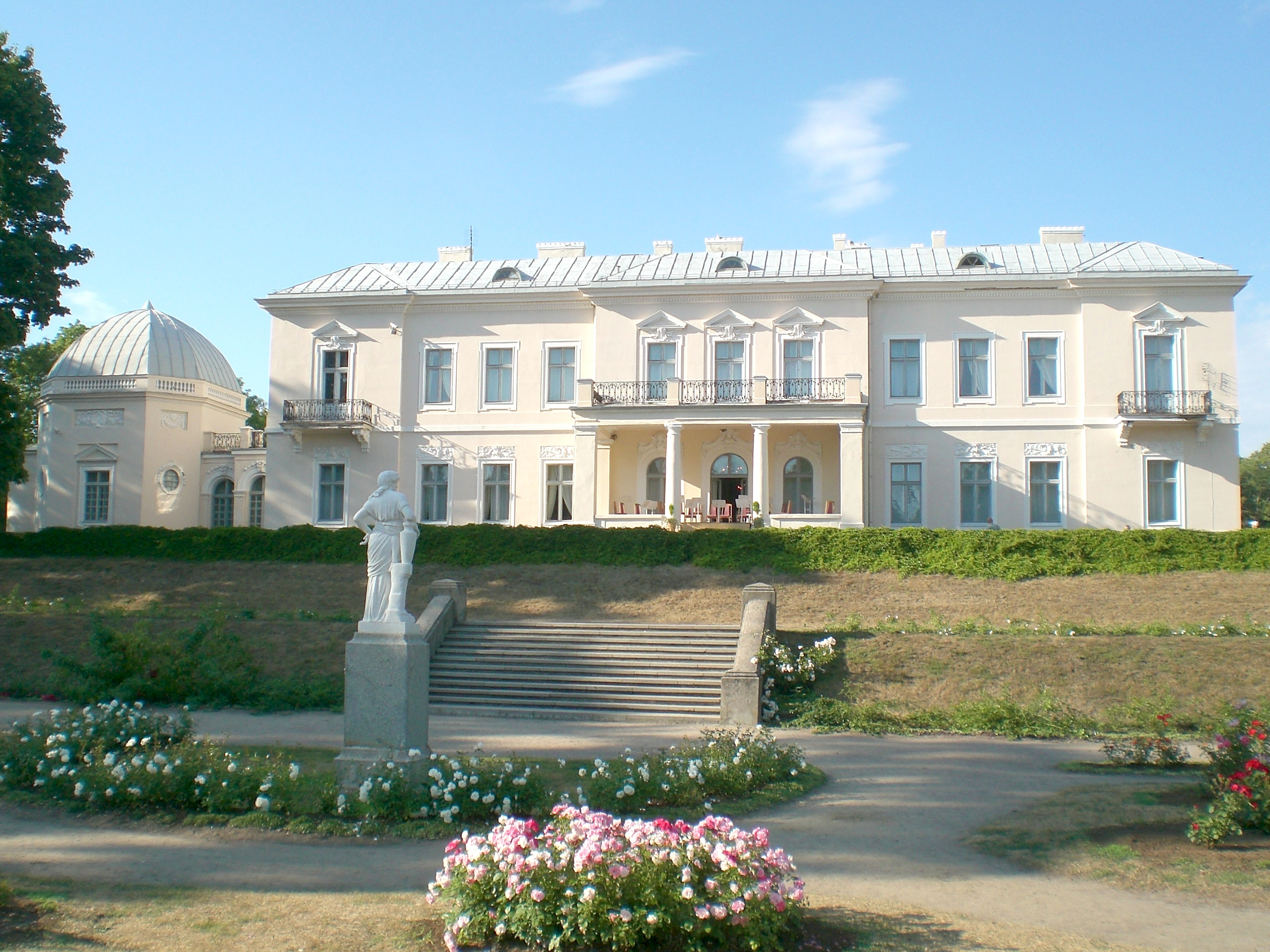
The Palanga Amber Museum holds about 28,000 pieces of amber.

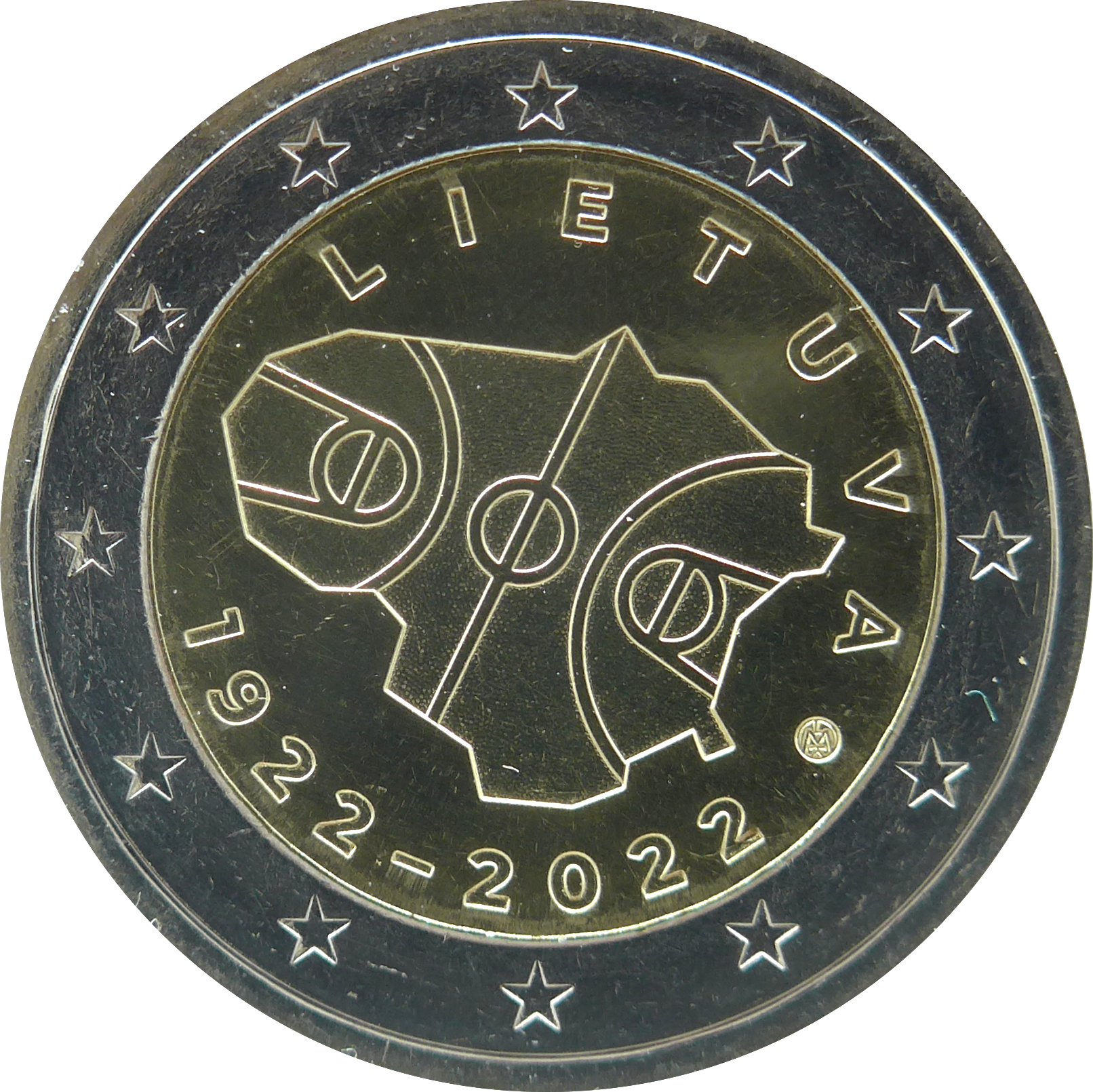
A Lithuanian 2 euro commemorative coin for the centennial of Basketball in Lithuania, with silhouette map of Lithuania and basketball playground

Amber, nicknamed "Lithuanian gold", has been harvested from the shores of the Baltic Sea since prehistoric times. The Palanga Amber Museum holds thousands of amber specimens and artifacts. Most women in Lithuania are believed to possess some item of amber jewelry.

Basketball, Lithuania's most popular sport, could be also considered a national symbol. During the 1980s basketball was an important outlet of national feelings, particularly when the country's favorite team, Žalgiris Kaunas, played against CSKA Moscow in the finals of the Soviet Union league. The Lithuanian basketball medals in the 1992 Olympic Games encouraged this symbolism. The 1992 and 1996 basketball teams, which were partially sponsored by the Grateful Dead, sported red, yellow, and green tie-died T-shirts echoing the colors of the flag, featuring the now-trademarked Slam Dunking Skeleton created by New York sports artist Greg Speirs.
