= Lietuwißka Ceitunga =

Lithuanian-language newspaper published for Prussian Lithuanians

The Lietuwißka Ceitunga (literally: Lithuanian Newspaper) was an influential Lithuanian-language newspaper published for Prussian Lithuanians, an ethnic minority of East Prussia, a province of the German Empire. It was established in 1877 by Martynas Šernius (Martin Szernus) and Heinrich Holz in Klaipėda (Memel) and continued to be published until September 30, 1940.

Initially it promoted pro-Lithuanian ideas and invited writers from Lithuania Major. Its early contributors included Jonas Basanavičius, Jonas Šliūpas, Georg Sauerwein. The newspaper published news from the region, Germany and Lithuania, until 1918 part of Russia. It also included articles on Lithuanian history, culture, language, and patriotic poems, including Lietuvininkai we are born by Sauerwein and works by Antanas Baranauskas. After Aušra, the first newspaper with contributors from both Prussian and Russian Lithuania, appeared in 1883, Lietuwißka Ceitunga became more pro-German and largely abandoned patriotic topics, leaving only articles concerning general news and religious matters. The shift in political attitude was also influenced by threats and economic pressure from German authorities. To counter this, a new more pro-Lithuanian newspaper, Nauja Lietuwißka Ceitunga, was published in Tilsit in 1890–1923. Šernius was editor-in-chief of Lietuwißka Ceitunga until it was acquired in June 1905 by the Siebert Press, publishers of vehemently pro-German Memeler Dampfboot. After the Klaipėda Region was attached to Lithuania in 1923, Lietuwißka Ceitunga was a highly conservative pro-German newspaper. Reportedly, it was not profitable and was funded by Berlin.

In later years contributors included Pastor Martin Keturakaitis, Jonas Kikilius, Endrikis Radžiūnas, Kristupas Lokys, Ieva Simonaitytė. Lietuwißka Ceitunga published various supplements, including German-language Beilage zu der Lietuviszka ceitunga and supplements for farmers (Laukininkų prietelis in 1896–1900, Lietuvos ūkininkas in 1900, Laukininkas in 1929–1939). It also published free booklets to its subscribers, including shortened The Jewish War by Josephus in 1881 and Nusidavimai apie senuosius prūsus (on history of Old Prussia) by Nikodemas Jaunius in 1906. The newspaper used traditional German blackletter script and Lithuanian language heavily influenced by German vocabulary and style. For example, the word ceitunga is a Lithuanianized version of German Zeitung (newspaper). Lietuwißka Ceitunga also capitalized all nouns in the German fashion and used Fraktur letters, including letters w and ß that do not exist in today's Lithuanian alphabet. Initially it was published once a week, then bi-weekly (1900–1913), three times a week (1913–1932), and daily (1932–1940). Its circulation was about 700 copies in 1897, 700–800 in 1912, 5200 in 1931, and 3850 in 1935.
