= Lietuvininkai we are born =

Lithuanian-language patriotic and sentimental poem

Lietuvininkai we are born (Lithuanian: Lietuvninkai mes esam gimę, German: Als Litauer sind wir geboren) is a Lithuanian-language patriotic and sentimental poem written by the German linguist Georg Sauerwein in 1879. It is a passionate defense of Prussian Lithuanian (Lietuvininkai) language and culture, rallying people to resist Germanisation attempts. However, at the same time the poem proclaimed love and loyalty to the Kaiser signifying that the rally was cultural and not political. It was inspired by Enlightenment ideas that archaic languages and traditions of minorities should be cherished, studied, and preserved. The poem was first published in the Prussian Lithuanian newspaper Lietuwißka Ceitunga in 1879.

The poem was set to music in 1908 by the composer Stasys Šimkus and became the unofficial anthem of Lithuania Minor. Its shortened version uses only the 1st and 4th stanzas relevant to both Lithuania Minor and Lithuania Major and replaces Lietuvininkai with Lietuviai (Lithuanians), was proposed to become the National Anthem of Lithuania after Lithuania established its nation state in 1918. Although it did not become the national anthem of the country, its popularity continued as a patriotic song which often could be heard during the Singing Revolution. The musical theme of the song was used by the Lithuanian radio (before World War II), Sąjūdis television programming, and news broadcast of Lithuanian National Radio.
