= Prussian Lithuanians =

Prussian Lithuanians Lietuvininkai Kleinlitauener

Languages
- Low German (Low Prussian dialect) and Lithuanian

Religion
- Lutheranism (majority), Romuva

Related ethnic groups
- Old Prussians, Kursenieki, Lithuanians, Latvians, Baltic Germans

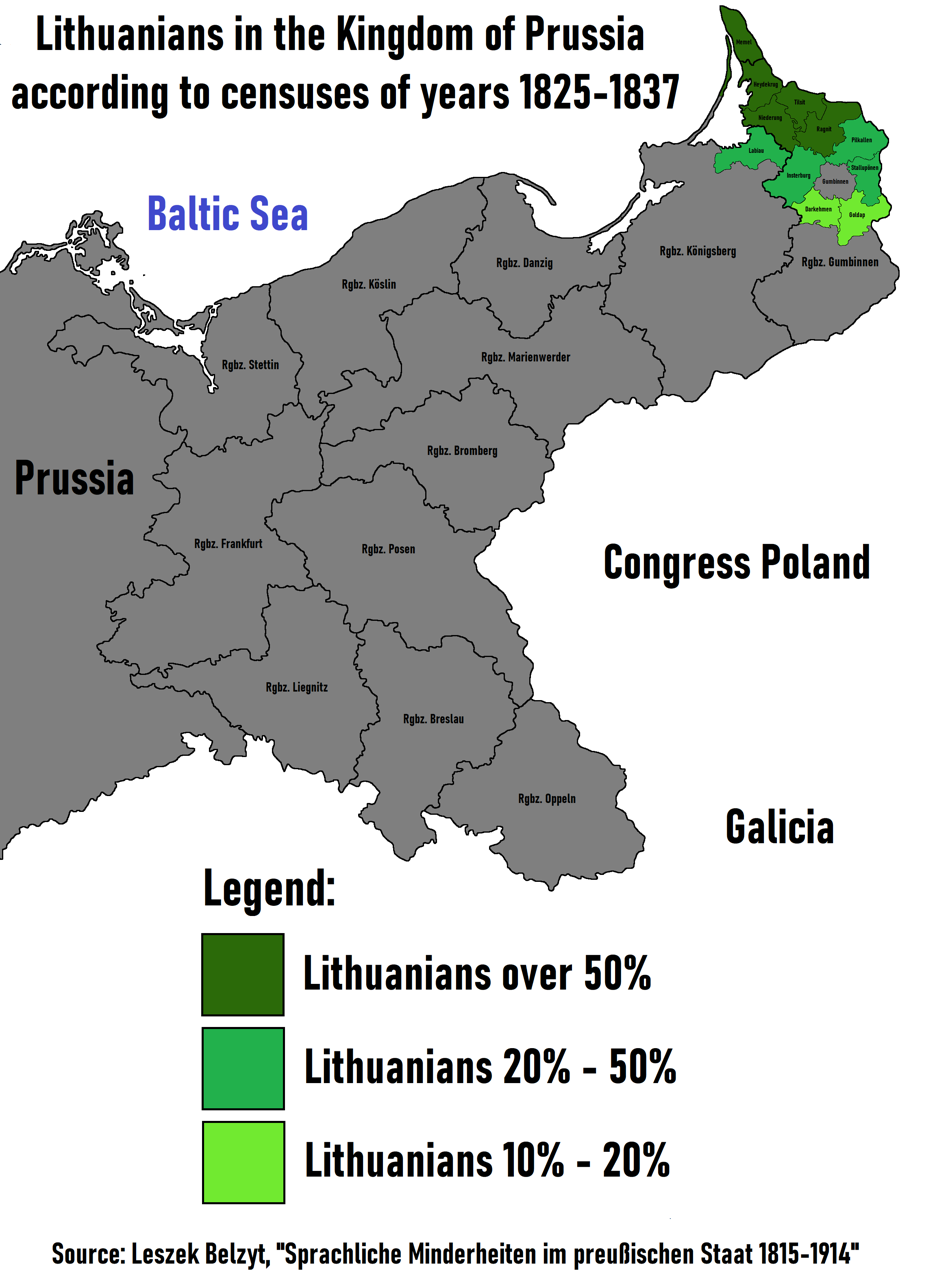
Lithuanians in Prussia according to censuses of years 1825-1837

The Prussian Lithuanians, or Lietuvininkai (singular: Lietuvininkas, plural: Lietuvininkai), are Lithuanians, originally Lithuanian language speakers, who formerly inhabited a territory in northeastern East Prussia called Prussian Lithuania, or Lithuania Minor (Lithuanian: Prūsų Lietuva, Mažoji Lietuva, German: Preußisch-Litauen, Kleinlitauen), instead of the Grand Duchy of Lithuania and, later, the Republic of Lithuania (Lithuania Major, or Lithuania proper). Prussian Lithuanians contributed greatly to the development of written Lithuanian, which for a long time was considerably more widespread and in more literary use in Lithuania Minor than in Lithuania proper.

Unlike most Lithuanians, who remained Roman Catholic after the Protestant Reformation, most Lietuvininkai became Lutheran-Protestants (Evangelical-Lutheran).

There were 121,345 speakers of Lithuanian in the Prussian census of 1890 with a much greater figure of people of Lithuanian origin. Almost all Prussian Lithuanians were murdered or expelled after World War II, when East Prussia was divided between Poland and the Soviet Union. The northern part became the Kaliningrad Oblast, while the southern part was attached to Poland. Only the small Klaipėda Region (German: Memelland) was reattached to Lithuania.

== Ethnonyms and identity ==
The term Preußische Litauer (Prussian Lithuanians in German) appeared in German texts of the 16th century. The term Kleinlitaw (Lithuania Minor in German) was first used by Simon Grunau between 1517 and 1527. Prussian Lithuanians used various names for themselves: Prussians (Lithuanian: Prūsai, German: Preusch), Prussian Lithuanians (Lithuanian: Pruſû Lietuwiai, Pruſû Lietuvininkai, Pruſißki Lietuvininkai, German: Preußische Litauer), or simply Lithuanians (Lithuanian: Lietuw(i)ni(n)kai, German: Litauer). Local self-designating terms found in literature, such as Sziszionißkiai ("people from here"), Burai (German: Bauern), were neither politonyms nor ethnonyms. Another similar term appeared in the Klaipėda Region (Memelland) during the interwar years – Memellanders (Lithuanian: Klaipėdiškiai, German: Memelländer). Modern Lithuanian historiography uses the term Lietuvininkai or sometimes a neologism unknown to Lietuwininkai themselves, Mažlietuviai. The usage of Lietuvininkai is problematic as it is a synonym of the word Lietuviai ("Lithuanians"), and not the name of a separate ethnic sub-group.

For Prussian Lithuanians loyalty to the German state, strong religious beliefs, and the mother tongue were the three main criteria of self-identification. Due to differences in religion and loyalties to a different state, the Prussian Lithuanians did not consider Lithuanians of the Grand Duchy to be part of their community. They used the exonym Samogitians (Lithuanian: Źemaicziai, German: Szameiten) to denote Lithuanians of Lithuania Major. As with other closely related groups with differing religions (e.g. Northern Ireland, former Yugoslavia), antagonism was frequent between the Lutheran Prussian Lithuanians and the Catholic Lithuanians of the Grand Duchy, despite the common language. For example, inhabitants of Lithuania did not trust Prussian Lithuanians in the Klaipėda Region and tended to eliminate them from posts in government institutions. When Prussian Lithuanian writer Ieva Simonaitytė (Ewa Simoneit) chose the side of the Lithuanian Republic, she was condemned by relatives, friends and neighbours. Only a few Prussian Lithuanians worked in the government of Lithuania between World War I and World War II, including Dovas Zaunius and Jurgis Aukštuolaitis (who later decided to support Poland instead). The antagonism persisted until the end of World War II.

== History ==
Distribution of the Baltic tribes, c. 1200

=== Early history ===
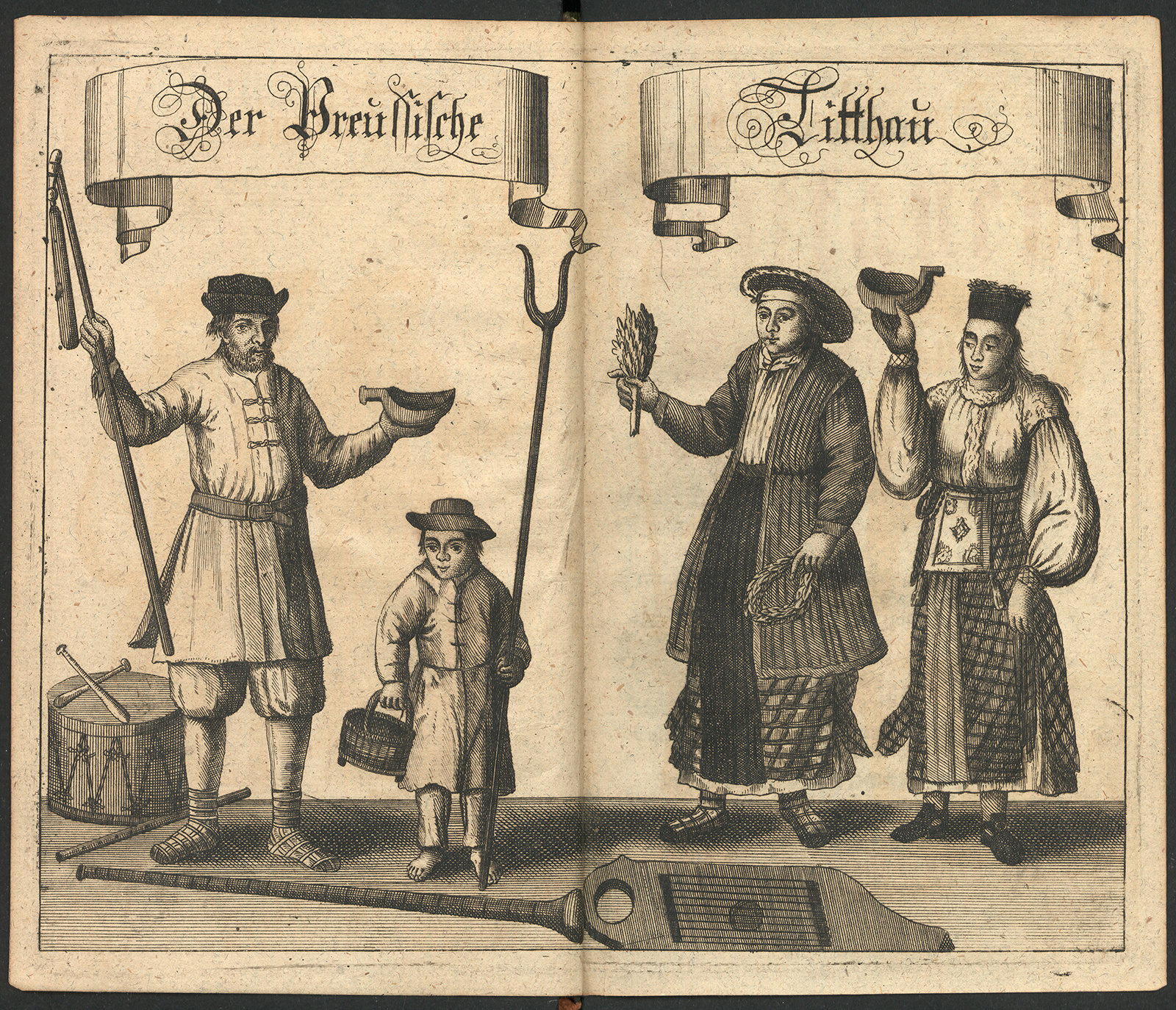
Prussian Lithuanians in 1744

The territory where Prussian Lithuanians lived in ancient times was inhabited by the Old Prussian, Skalvian and Curonian tribes. The area between the rivers Alle and Neman became almost uninhabited during the 13th-century Prussian Crusade and wars between the pagan Grand Duchy of Lithuania and the Teutonic Order. This uninhabited area was named the wilderness in chronicles. Local tribes were resettled, either voluntarily or by force, in the Monastic State of the Teutonic Knights and in the Grand Duchy of Lithuania. After the 1422 Treaty of Melno, a stable border between the two states was established. Better living conditions in the Monastic State of the Teutonic Knights attracted many Lithuanians and Samogitians to settle there. Masurians and Curonians began moving into Prussia around the same time.

After 1525, the last Grand Master of the Teutonic Order Albert became duke of Prussia and converted to Protestantism. Many Prussian Lithuanians also became Protestants. By the will of Albert, church services for Prussian Lithuanians were held in the Lithuanian language. Although Lithuanians who settled in Prussia were mainly farmers, in the 16th century there was an influx of educated Protestant immigrants from Lithuania, such as Martynas Mažvydas, Abraomas Kulvietis and Stanislovas Rapolionis, who became among the first professors at Königsberg University, founded in 1544. Martynas Mažvydas was a zealous Protestant and urged citizens to stop all contact between Prussian Lithuanians and Lithuanians living in the Grand Duchy of Lithuania in a bid to curtail Catholic influence in the country.

The Lithuanian-speaking population was dramatically decreased by the Great Northern War plague outbreak in 1700–1721 which killed 53 percent of residents in Lithuania Minor and more than 90 percent of the deceased were Prussian Lithuanians. To compensate for the loss, King Frederick II of Prussia invited settlers from Salzburg, the Palatinate, and Nassau to repopulate the area. Many of these Lutherans were members of the Pietism movement, which then spread among Prussian Lithuanians. In 1811 a teacher's seminary for Prussian Lithuanians was established in Karalene near Insterburg, which remained open until 1924. From the mid-18th century, a majority of Prussian Lithuanians were literate; in comparison, the process was much slower in the Grand Duchy.

=== 19th century ===
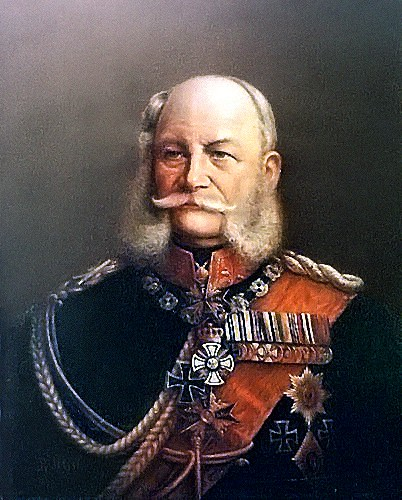
The 7th stanza of Lietuvininks we are born was dedicated to German Emperor Wilhelm I (Lithuanian: Vilhelmas I)

The nationalistic Lithuanian national revival in the late 19th century was not popular with Prussian Lithuanians. To them integration with Lithuania was not understandable and not acceptable. The idea of Lithuanian–Latvian unity was more popular than idea of Lithuanian-Prussian Lithuanian unity during the Great Seimas of Vilnius, a conference held in 1905.

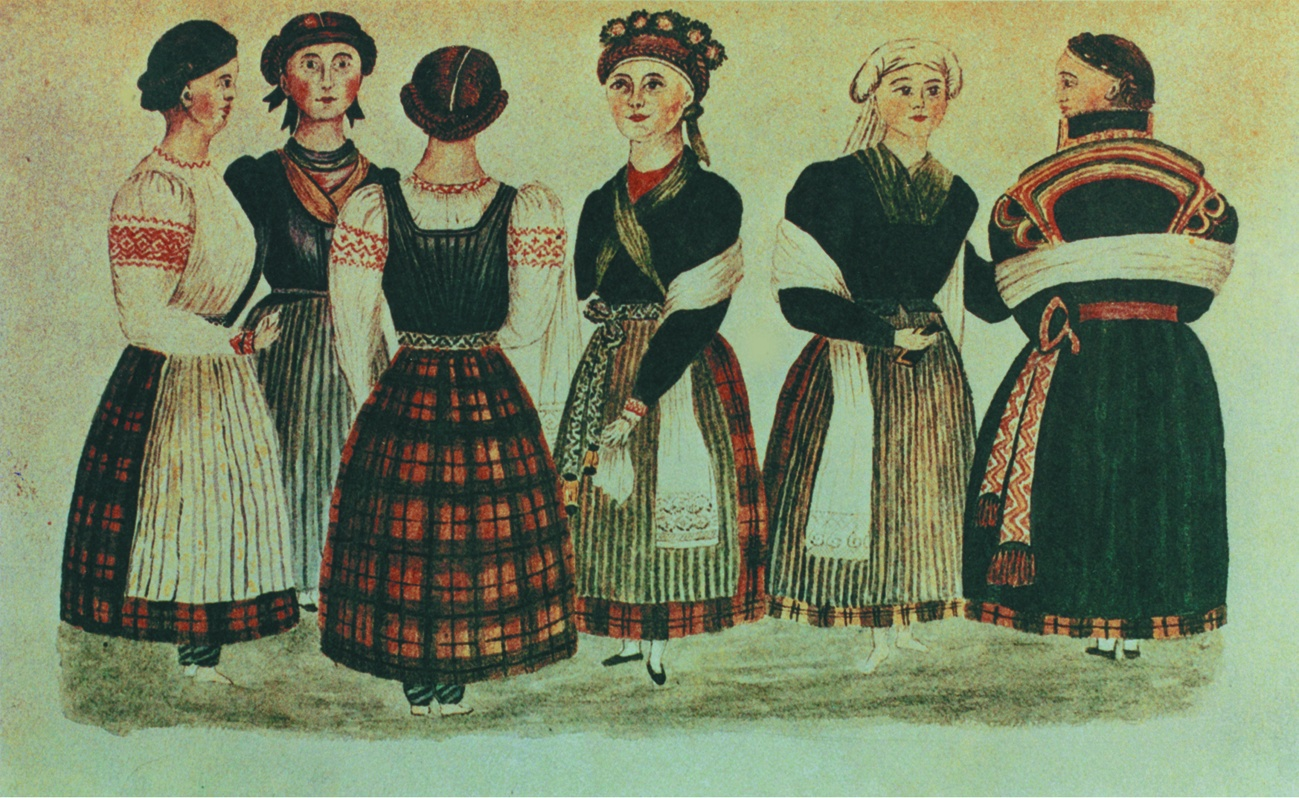
Prussian Lithuanians with national costumes in the 19th century

The first Prussian Lithuanian elected to the Reichstag, Jonas Smalakys, was a fierce agitator for the integrity of the German Empire. In 1879, Georg Sauerwein published the poem Lietuwininkais esame mes gime in the newspaper Lietuwißka Ceitunga. The 7th stanza was dedicated to Wilhelm I, German Emperor.

There was no national Germanization policy until 1873; Prussian Lithuanians voluntarily adopted German language and culture. After the Unification of Germany in 1871, when part of Lithuania became integrated with the new nation of Germany, learning the German language was made compulsory in state schools. Studying the German language provided the possibility for Prussian Lithuanians to become acquainted with Western European culture and values. However, Germanization also provoked a cultural movement among Prussian Lithuanians. In 1879 and 1896, petitions for the return of the Lithuanian language to schools was signed by 12,330 and 23,058 Prussian Lithuanians from the districts of Memel, Heydekrug, Tilsit and Ragnit. In 1921, the French administration made a survey in the Klaipėda Region that showed that only 2.2 percent of Prussian Lithuanians would prefer purely Lithuanian schools. The Lithuanian language and culture were not persecuted in Prussia. By contrast, there were restrictive Russification policies and a Lithuanian press ban in the parts of Lithuania that had become part of the Russian Empire. The Prussian Lithuanians could publish their own newspapers and books, even helping Lithuanians in Russia to bypass their press ban by publishing their newspapers, such as Auszra and Varpas.

Districts of East Prussia

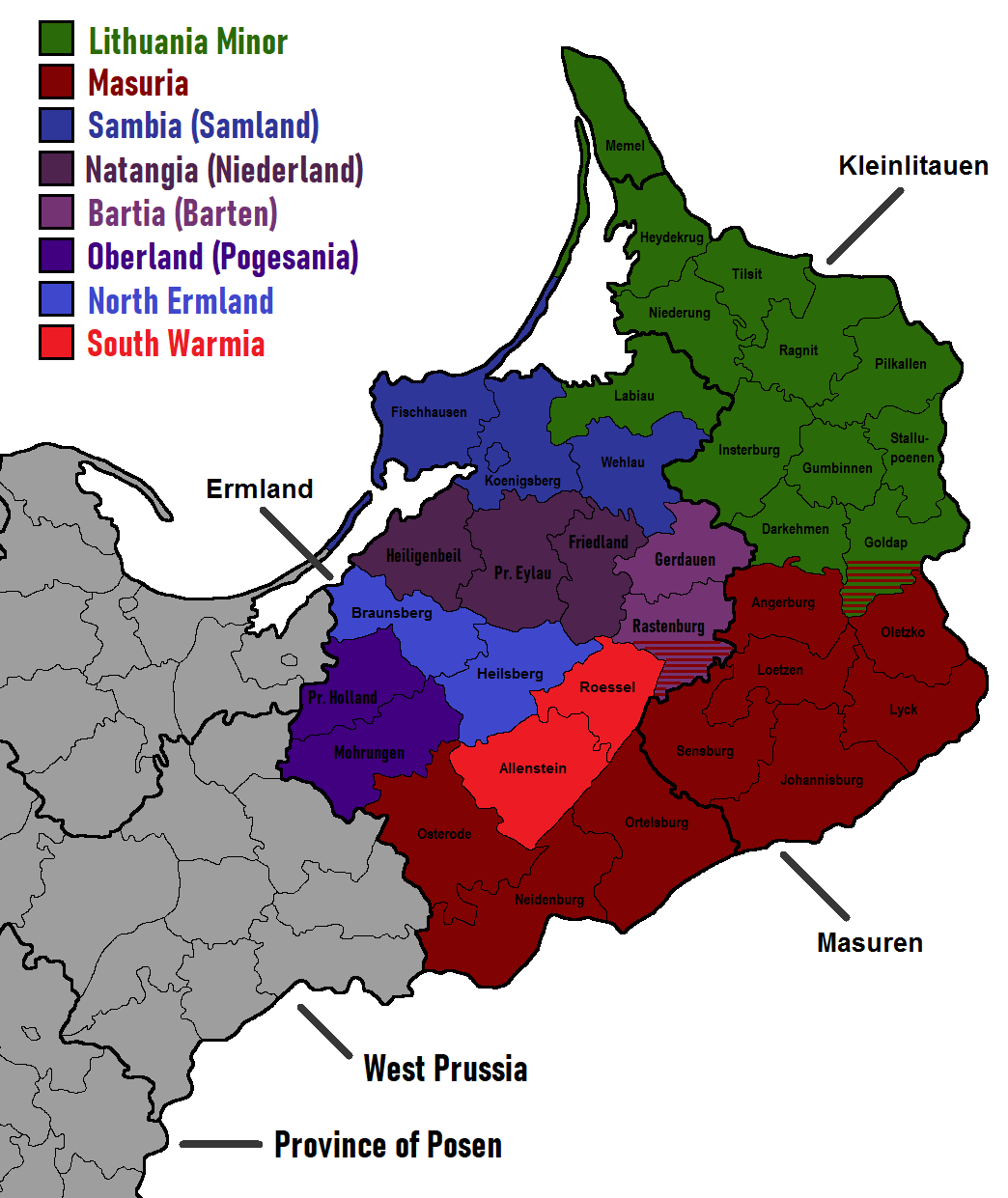
Lithuania Minor within East Prussia

Lithuanian-speaking population in the Kingdom of Prussia
District (Kreis)	Region (Regierungsbezirk)	1825		1834		1846	
District (Kreis)	Region (Regierungsbezirk)	Number	%	Number	%	Number	%
Labiau	Königsberg	8,806	28.3	11,993	33.0	14,454	32.3
Memel	Königsberg	19,422	52.5	22,386	59.6	26,645	58.1
Heydekrug	Gumbinnen	16,502	71.9	18,112	71.8	22,475	68.7
Insterburg	Gumbinnen	10,108	25.0	9,537	18.3	5,399	9.3
Niederung	Gumbinnen	18,366	49.1	20,173	45.7	20,206	41.0
Pillkallen	Gumbinnen	11,271	38.5	10,687	34.1	13,820	34.4
Ragnit	Gumbinnen	15,711	47.8	18,443	46.6	19,888	42.6
Stallupönen	Gumbinnen	5,435	20.7	5,312	16.8	5,907	15.7
Tilsit	Gumbinnen	18,057	47.5	22,471	50.5	26,880	48.6
Goldap	Gumbinnen	3,559	14.3	3,548	12.0	2,259	6.1
Darkehmen	Gumbinnen	2,992	12.5	1,102	3.9	330	1.0

=== Between the two World Wars ===
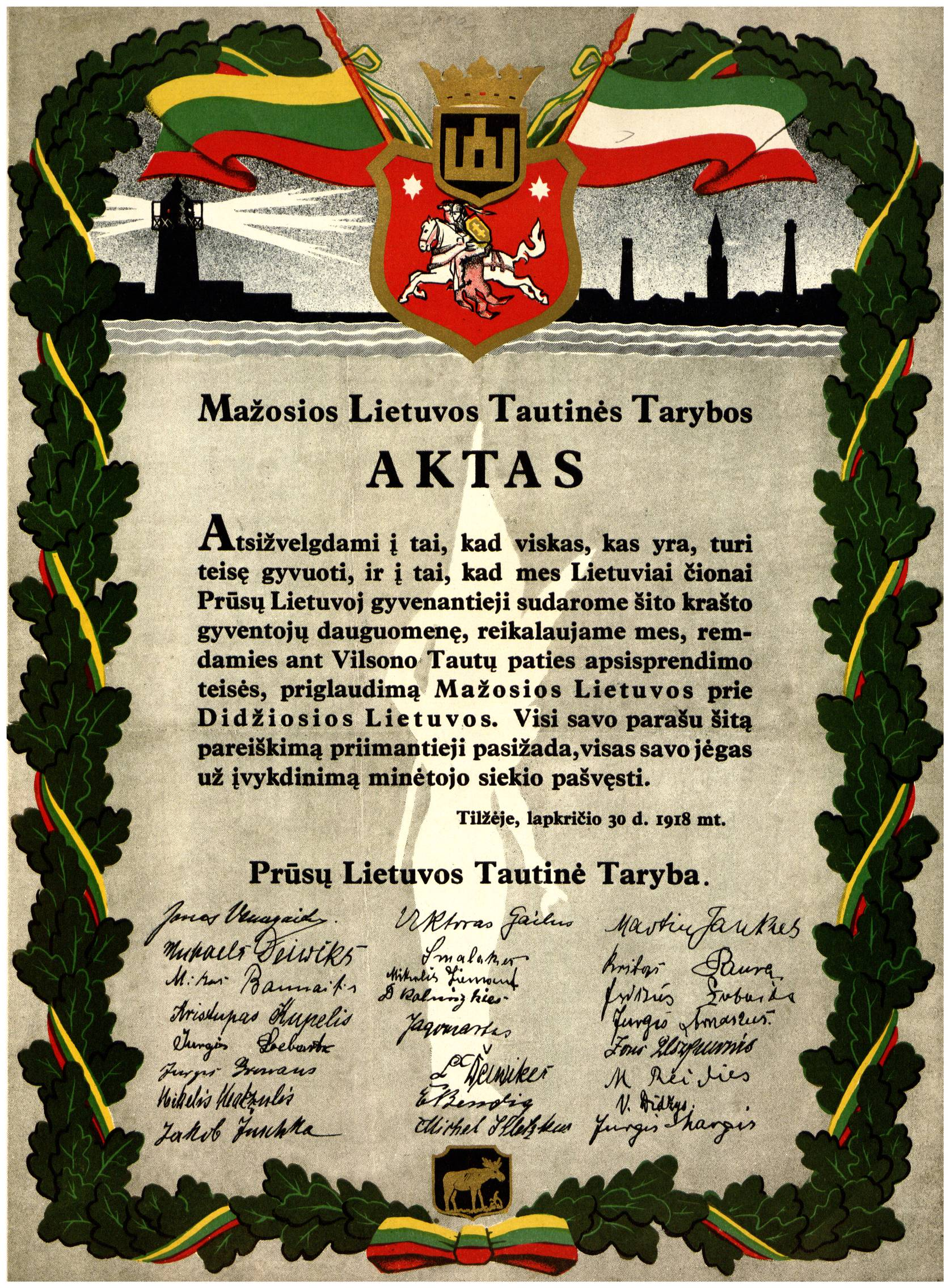
A 1938 reproduction of the Act of Tilsit, signed in 1918

The northern part of East Prussia beyond the Neman River was detached from East Prussia at the Paris Peace Conference of 1919, dividing the territories inhabited by Prussian Lithuanians between Weimar Germany and the Klaipėda Region (Memelland) under the administration of the Council of Ambassadors, which was formed to enforce the agreements reached in the Treaty of Versailles. The organisation "Deutsch-Litauischer Heimatbund" (Lithuanian: Namynês Bundas) sought reunification with Germany or to create an independent state of Memelland and had a membership of 30,000 individuals. Two dozen pro-Lithuanian representatives of the Prussian Lithuanian National Council signed the Act of Tilsit, asking to unite the Klaipėda Region with Lithuania; the idea was not supported by the majority of Prussian Lithuanians. World War I was followed by severe economical hardships and inflation in Germany. In 1923, the Republic of Lithuania occupied the Klaipėda Region during the Klaipėda Revolt.

A secret report of 1923 by Jonas Polovinskas-Budrys, a Lithuanian professional counterintelligence officer, shows around 60 percent of the local inhabitants supported the revolt, 30 percent were neutral and 10 percent were against, namely the supporters of a freistadt status or reunification with Germany. Soon Lithuanian policies alienated the Prussian Lithuanians. People from Greater Lithuania were sent to assume public administration posts in the region. According to the Lithuanian view, the Prussian Lithuanians were Germanized Lithuanians who should be re-Lithuanized. Prussian Lithuanians saw this Lithuanization policy as a threat to their own culture and began to support German political parties, and even started identifying themselves as Germans. During the 1925 census, 37,626 people declared themselves to be Lithuanians and 34,337 people identified themselves as Memellanders, a neologism to distinguish themselves from Lithuanians. Inhabitants of the Klaipėda Region continuously voted for German or German-oriented parties.

Nazi Germany invaded Klaipėda after the 1939 German ultimatum to Lithuania. The inhabitants were allowed to choose Lithuanian citizenship. Only 500 asked for citizenship, and only 20 were awarded it. The reunification of Klaipėda with Germany was met with joy by a majority of inhabitants. About 10,000 refugees, mostly Jews, fled the region.

=== World War II and after ===
After the Nazis came to power in 1933, Prussian Lithuanian activists living in Germany were persecuted. In 1938, Prussian and Lithuanian place names in East Prussia were translated into German or replaced by German names often unrelated to the Lithuanian toponym. For example, Lasdehnen (Lazdynai) became Haselberg, Jodlauken (Juodlaukiai) became Schwalbental, and so on. The Prussian Lithuanian newspaper Naujaſis Tilźes Keleiwis was not closed down until 1940, during World War II. Church services in Tilsit and Ragnit were held in the Lithuanian language until the evacuation of East Prussia in late 1944.

The evacuation started late; the Red Army approached much faster than expected and cut off the territorial connection with other German-held territories by January 26, 1945. Many refugees perished due to Soviet low-flying strafing attacks on the civilians columns, or the extreme cold. However, many managed to flee by land or sea into those parts of Germany captured by the British and Americans. Among the latter were the pastors A. Keleris, J. Pauperas, M. Preikšaitis, O. Stanaitis, A. Trakis, and J. Urdse, who gathered those from the Lithuanian parishes and reorganised the Lithuanian church in the western zones of Allied-occupied Germany.

==== Expulsion after World War II ====
The Red Army made no distinction between Germans of Prussian Lithuanian or German ethnicity. During the evacuation of East Prussia, Prussian Lithuanians, like other East Prussians, fled in an attempt to escape. Mass murder, rape, and looting were the common fate of those who did not succeed. After the end of war, some Prussian Lithuanians tried to return to their East Prussian homes, but they were discriminated against and denied food rations by the Soviets.

All who remained at the war's end were expelled from Soviet's Kaliningrad Oblast and from the former Klaipėda Region, which was transferred to the Lithuanian SSR in 1947. By 1945, there were only about 20,000 inhabitants left in the Klaipėda Region, compared to the 152,800 in 1939. The government of the Lithuanian SSR followed Soviet policy and viewed the Prussian Lithuanians as Germans. About 8,000 persons were repatriated from displaced persons camps during 1945–1950. However, their homes and farms were not returned as either Russians or Lithuanians had already occupied their property. Prussians who remained in the former Memel (Klaipėda) territory were fired from their jobs and otherwise discriminated against. After the collapse of the Soviet Union, some Prussian Lithuanians and their descendants did not regain lost property in the Klaipėda region.

==== 1950 and beyond ====
In 1951 about 3,500 people from the former Memel Territory were expelled by the authority of the Lithuanian SSR to East Germany. After Konrad Adenauer's visit to Moscow in 1958, the former citizens of Germany were allowed to emigrate, and the majority of Prussian Lithuanians in the Lithuanian SSR emigrated to West Germany. Only about 2,000 local Lithuanians chose to remain in the Klaipėda Region and virtually none in the Kaliningrad Oblast. The majority of Prussian Lithuanians today live in the Federal Republic of Germany. Together with 65,000 refugees from Lithuania proper, mostly Roman Catholic, who made their way to the western occupation zones of Germany, by 1948 they had founded 158 schools in the Lithuanian language.

Due to the emigration of many Lithuanians overseas and the assimilation of the remaining Prussian Lithuanians in Germany, the number of Lithuanian schools has now dwindled to only one, Litauisches Gymnasium/Vasario 16-osios gimnazija (Lithuanian High School) (in German) in Lampertheim in Hesse. Until 1990, this secondary boarding school was the only Lithuanian school outside areas controlled by the Soviet Union. It was attended by several well-known exiled Lithuanians, such as the singer Lena Valaitis.

Communities of Prussian Lithuanians have developed in Canada, the United States, Sweden and Australia. However, a separate ethnic and cultural identity for Prussian Lithuanians is not as strong as it once was, and cultural differences are gradually vanishing.

== Culture and traditions ==
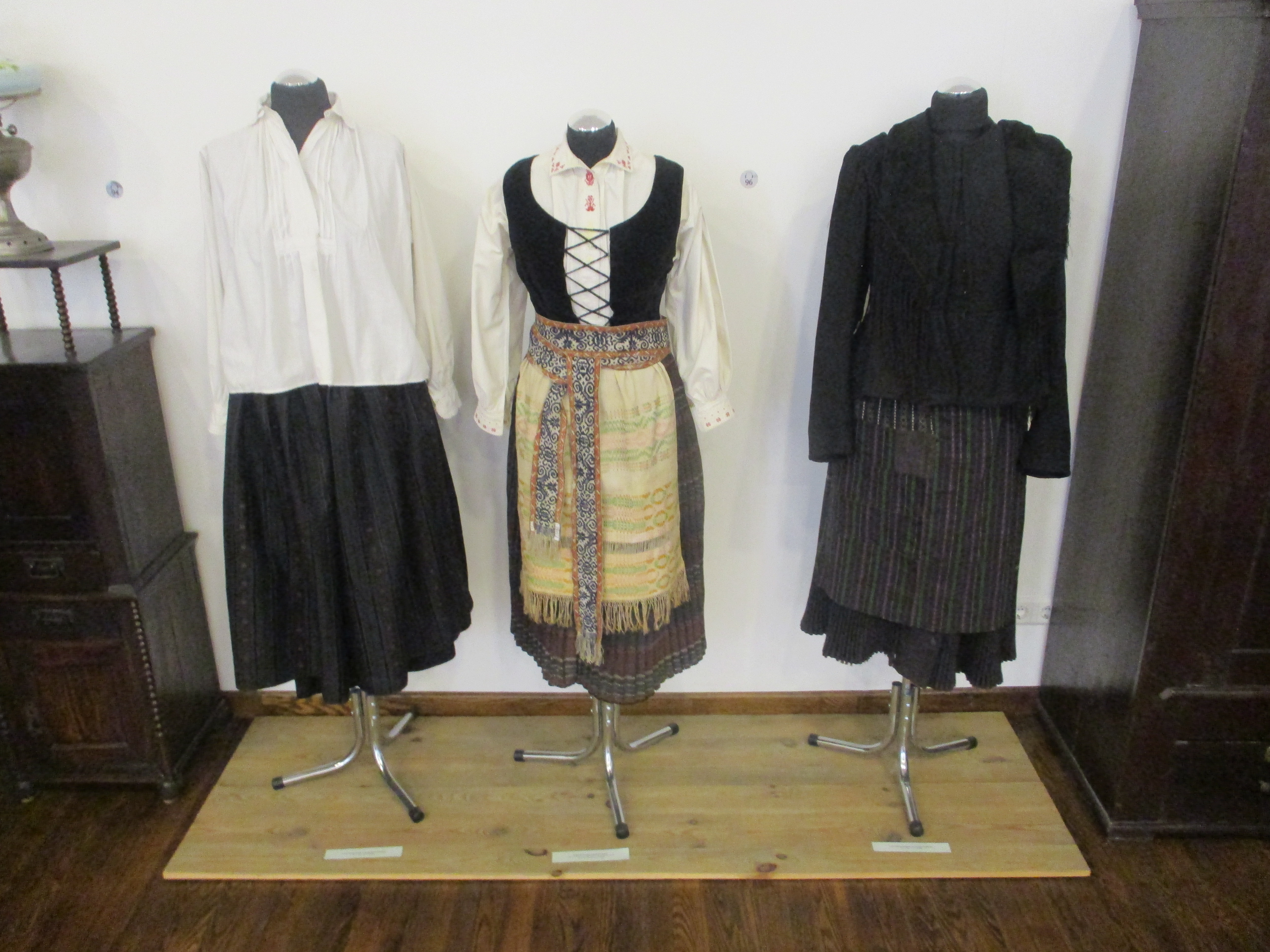
Lietuvininkai attire and church clothing from the beginning of the 19th century to the end of the 20th century (left and right) and folk costume from the Memel coast (in the middle; 1914), The History Museum of Lithuania Minor

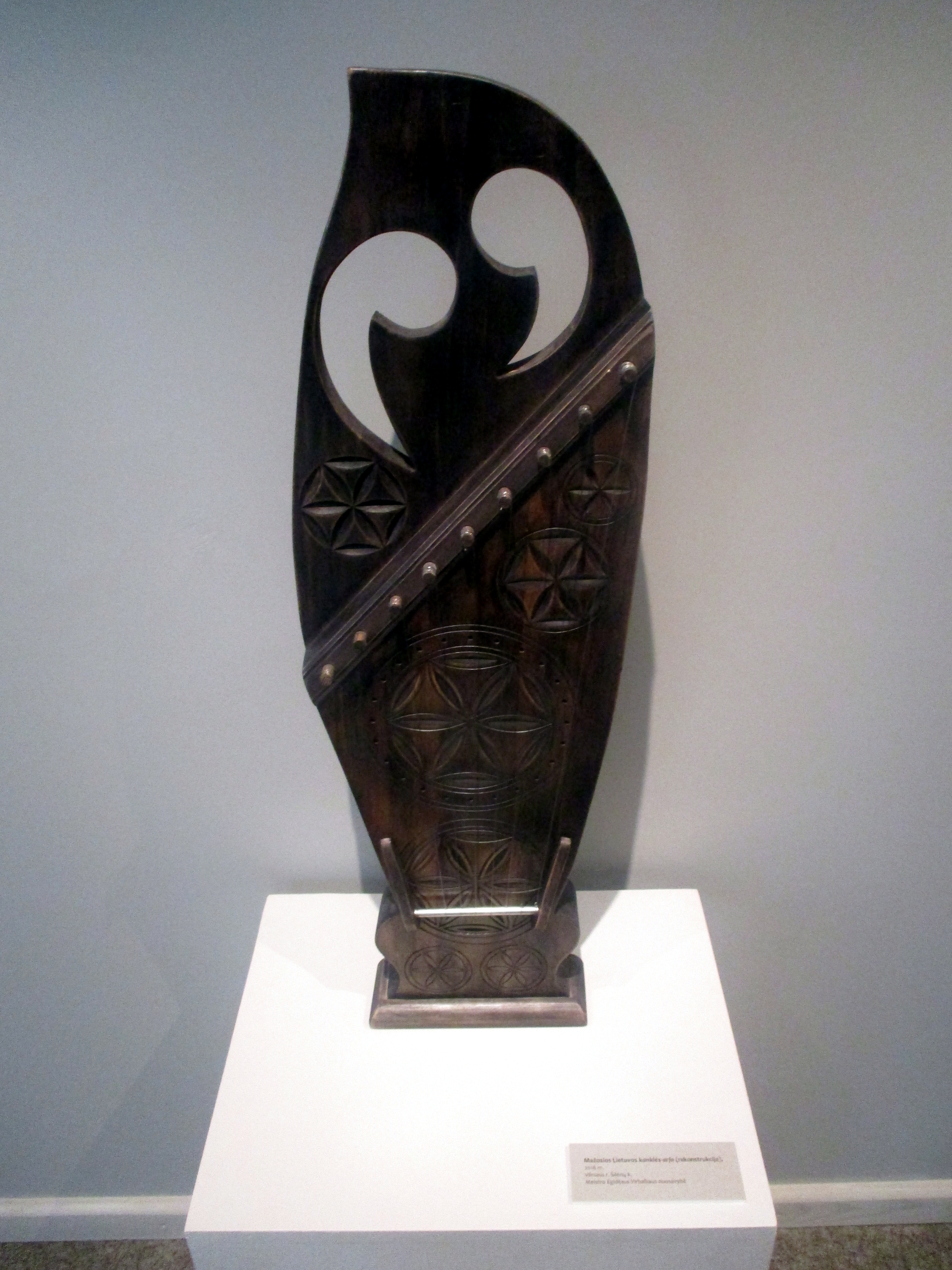
Reconstruction of a kanklės-harp (kanklės-arfa) from Lithuania Minor on the basis of Teodor Lepner's 1744 book "Der Preussische Litauer", National Museum of Lithuania

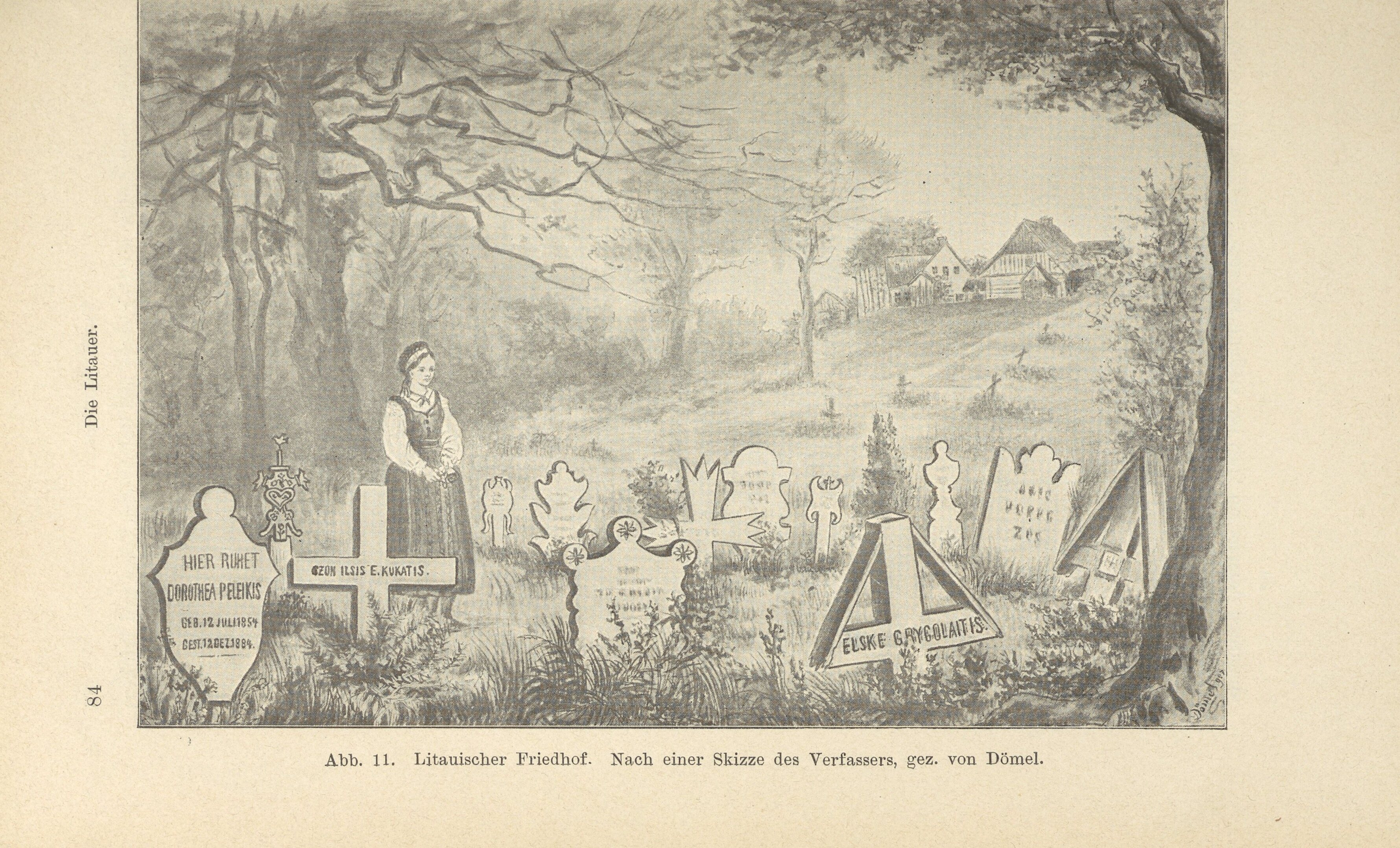
A Prussian Lithuanian cemetery

The Prussian Lithuanians that settled in the monastic state of the Teutonic Knights over the centuries were influenced by German culture and the German language. They adopted the cultural values and social conventions of the German state, but preserved their Lithuanian language, traditions and folk culture. For centuries Prussian Lithuanians lived in a political and religious environment that was different from that of other Lithuanians and evolved into a separate ethnic group. The common state united some aspects of, traditions and folk culture. who viewed its rulers as their own rulers. Hanging portraits of the rulers of the House of Hohenzollern in the home was widespread.

The Pietist congregational movement attracted large numbers of Prussian Lithuanians: evangelical fellowships (German: Stundenhalter, Lithuanian: Surinkimininkai) were very active in Prussia, as they were in the rest of the German Empire. About 40 percent of Lithuanians belonged to such fellowships, whose members lived by ascetic principles.

Until the mid-19th century Prussian Lithuanians were mostly villagers. Their feudal mentality is reflected in the poem The Seasons by Kristijonas Donelaitis. The Seasons criticizes the tendency to adopt German ways, since this was often associated with decadent noblemen. Donelaitis called for Lithuanians to do their duty, to not envy those who went to town, to not complain or be lazy, and try to work as much as was needed to be a good peasant:

There, in the city, one is laid up with his gout;
Another's aches and pains require a doctor's aid.
Why do these countless ills torment the luckless rich?
Why does untimely death so often strike them down?
It is because they scorn the fruitful work of boors,
Lead sinful lives, loaf, sleep too long and eat too much.
But here we simple boors, held by the lords as knaves,
Fed on unwinnowed bread and pallid buttermilk,
Work on the quick each day, as simple folk must do.

Towns were not large. People who emigrated to the major towns, Königsberg and Memel, usually became bilingual and eventually became Germanized.

After World War II, virtually no Prussian Lithuanians remained in Russia's Kaliningrad Oblast and only a small number survived in the Lithuanian SSR. Their peasant culture, first threatened by Germanization in the German Empire and politically oppressed in the Nazi era, was now completely wiped out by the Soviets, who made no distinction between Germans and Lithuanians. The situation was somewhat better in the former Memel Territory but even there churches and cemeteries were destroyed.

== Personal names ==
Prussian Lithuanian surnames often consist of a patronymic with suffixes "-eit" and "-at". It has the same role as the English suffix "-son" in the surnames Abrahamson and Johnson. Examples include: Abromeit, Grigoleit, Jakeit, Wowereit, Kukulat, Szameitat.

Another type of Prussian Lithuanian surname use the suffixes "-ies" or "-us": Kairies, Resgies, Baltßus, Karallus.

A difference existed between female and male surnames in everyday speech. For example, while officially the wife of Kurschat (Prussian Lithuanian Kurßaitis or Kurßatis) was also called Kurschat, in the Prussian Lithuanian language special forms were used in speech: the form of a wife's surname was Kurßaitê / Kurßatė and the form of an unmarried woman was Kurßaitikê / Kurßaitukê.

== Language ==
Since the end of the 18th and the beginning of the 19th century, Prussian Lithuanians have typically been bilingual.

=== German and Low Saxon ===
The spoken language mainly used by Prussian Lithuanians belongs to the Low Prussian dialect of Low German, Mundart des Ostgebietes subdialect. In institutions (High) German was used.

=== Lithuanian ===
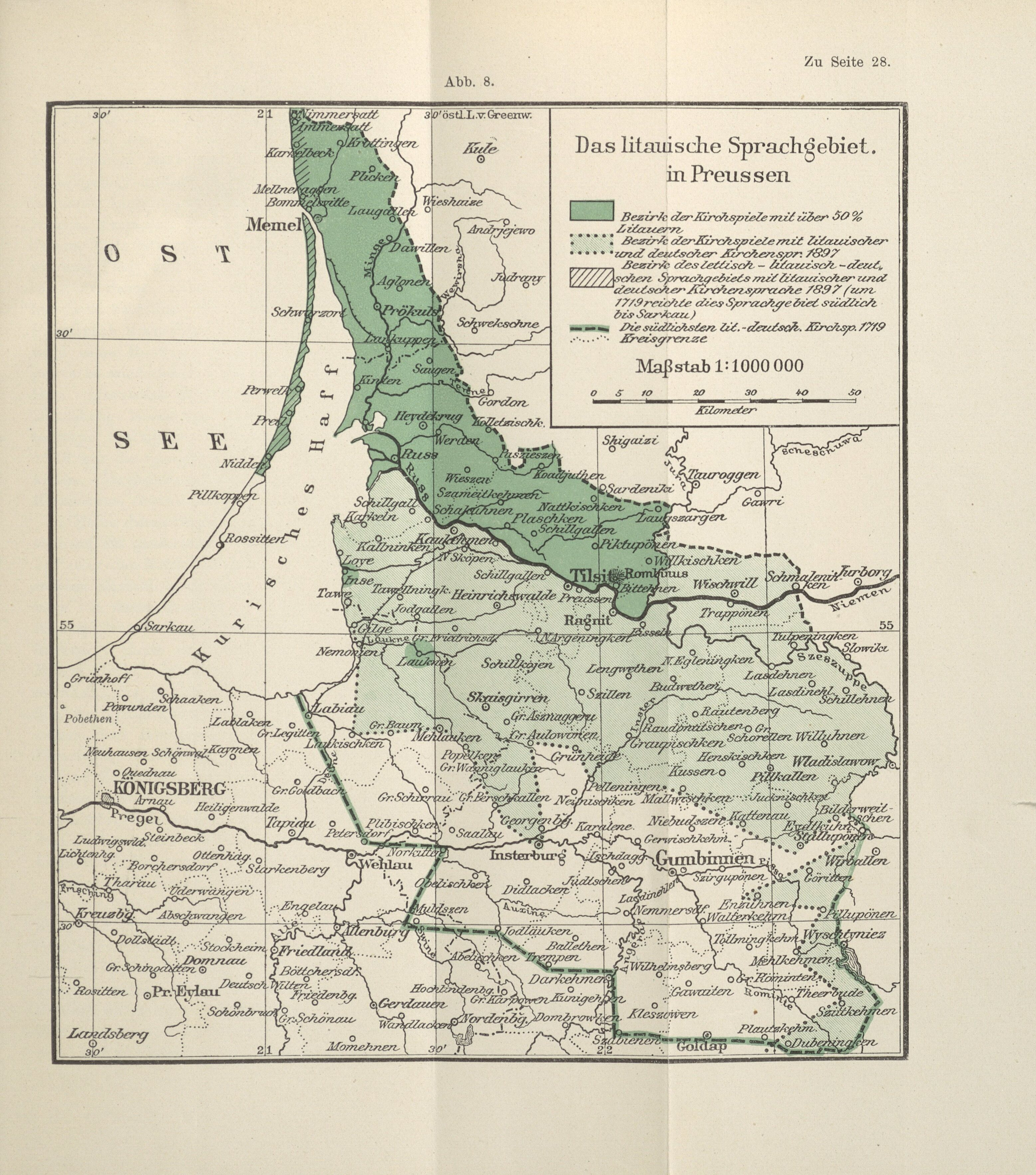
Lithuanian language in Prussia by Franz Oskar Tetzner in 1902

The Lithuanian language of Prussian Lithuanians could be divided into two main dialects: Samogitian dialect and Aukštaitian dialect. The standard Prussian Lithuanian language is quite similar to standard Lithuanian except for the number of German loanwords. The Lithuanian language which was spoken in the Grand Duchy of Lithuania was influenced by Polish and Ruthenian, while in Prussia it was influenced more heavily by the German language. Thus, while Lithuanians used Slavic loanwords and translations, Prussian Lithuanians used German loanwords and translations, and some Slavic loanwords.

== Prussian Lithuanian literature ==
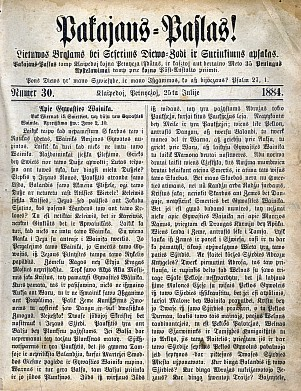
The Prussian Lithuanian newspaper Pakajaus Paſlas!: Lietuwos Brolams bei Seſerims Diewo-Ʒodi ir Surinkimus apſakas was published between 1881 and 1939.

Literature in the Lithuanian language appeared earlier in the Duchy of Prussia than in the Grand Duchy of Lithuania. The first book in Lithuanian was published in Königsberg in 1547 by Martynas Mažvydas, an émigré from Grand Duchy of Lithuania, while the first Lithuanian book in the Grand Duchy of Lithuania was printed in 1596 by Mikalojus Daukša. Many other authors who wrote in Lithuanian were not Prussian Lithuanians, but local Prussian Germans: Michael Märlin, Jakob Quandt, Wilhelm Martinius, Gottfried Ostermeyer, Sigfried Ostermeyer, Daniel Klein, Andrew Krause, Philipp Ruhig, Matttheus Praetorius, Christian Mielcke, Adam Schimmelpfennig, for example. The first major Lithuanian poet, Kristijonas Donelaitis, was from East Prussia and reflected the Prussian Lithuanian lifestyle in his works. The first newspaper in the Lithuanian language, Nuſidawimai apie Ewangēliôs Praſiplatinima tarp Źydû ir Pagonû, was published by Prussian Lithuanians. Prior to World War I, the government and political parties financed the Prussian Lithuanian press.

=== Orthography ===
The Prussian Lithuanian orthography was based on the German style, while in the Grand Duchy of Lithuania it was primarily based on the Polish style. Prussian Lithuanians used Gothic script. Lithuanians did not read Prussian Lithuanian publications and vice versa; the cultural communication was very limited. Attempts to create a unified newspaper and common orthography for all Lithuanian speakers at the beginning of the 20th century were unsuccessful. After 1905, modern Lithuanian orthography was standardized while Prussian Lithuanian orthography remained the same – German Gothic script, a noun was begun with a capital letter, the letters ſ, ß, ʒ were used, and the construction of sentences was different from Lithuanian.

Books and newspapers that were published in Lithuania in Roman type were reprinted in Gothic script in Memel Territory in 1923–39. The Prussian Lithuanian newspaper Naujaſis Tilźes Keleiwis (German: Neues Tilsiter Wanderer) was published in Tilsit in Gothic style until 1940, when it was closed by the Nazis.

== Notable Prussian Lithuanians ==
- Kristijonas Donelaitis, Prussian Lithuanian poet
- Pranas Domšaitis (born Franz Karl Wilhelm Domscheit), Prussian Lithuanian painter
- Vilius Storostas (born Wilhelm Storost), philosopher
- Otto D. Tolischus, American journalist, Pulitzer Prize winner
- Lena Valaitis, German schlager singer
- John Kay (born Joachim Fritz Krauledat), Canadian singer, songwriter and guitarist, frontman of Steppenwolf
- Bruno Sutkus, a Lithuanian-German sniper in the 68th Infantry Division of the German Army
- Bruno Taut, German architect also active in Japan and Turkey
- Max Taut, German architect
- Friedrich Baltrusch, German politician

== See also ==
- Prussian Latvians
- Masurians
- Memel Territory
- East Prussia
- Delmonas
