= Ieva Simonaitytė =

Lithuanian writer (1897–1978)

Ieva Simonaitytė or Ewa Simoneit (23 January 1897 – 27 August 1978) was a Lithuanian writer. She represented the culture of Lithuania Minor and Klaipėda Region, territories of German East Prussia with historically large, but dwindling, Lithuanian populations. She received critical acclaim for her novel Aukštujų Šimonių likimas (The Fate of Šimoniai from Aukštujai, 1935).

== Biography ==
Simonaitytė was born in a small village of Vanagai (then Wannaggen in German East Prussia) in Klaipėda District Municipality. At the age of five, she became ill with tuberculosis, that affected her bones, and she had to walk with canes since then. Hailing from a poor peasant family and growing up without a father, she had to work since young age as a gooseherd or babysitter. Learning to read and write from her mother, Simonaitytė was largely self-taught. From 1912 to 1914 Simonaitytė received treatment for tuberculosis in Angerburg. She returned in better health and, influenced by World War I, began her literary career publishing poems and short stories in various Lithuanian periodicals of the Lithuania Minor. She earned a living working as a seamstress until 1921, when she moved to Klaipėda, where she completed of evening courses of typist and stenographers. Simonaitytė worked as a secretary and translator. To some extent she was involved in political life of the Klaipėda Region, participating in the Klaipėda Revolt of 1923, working for the local seimelis (parliament established to guarantee autonomy for the region), and testifying in Nazi trials in 1934.

Her big break came in 1935 with publication of Aukštujų Šimonių likimas. She received state literary award, a pension, and dedicated her remaining life to literature. After the 1939 German ultimatum to Lithuania, Klaipėda was attached to Nazi Germany and Simonaitytė moved to Kaunas and in 1963 to Vilnius. Simonaitytė bought a summer house in Priekulė near Klaipėda in 1961 and spent most of her summers there. The summer house was turned into her memorial museum in 1984. Simonaitytė died in Vilnius and was buried in the Writers' Hill of the Antakalnis Cemetery.

== Works ==
Simonaitytė's most famous novel, Aukštujų Šimonių likimas, depicted the fate of the Šimoniai family between the 18th and 20th centuries through independent fragments. Once powerful and prosperous, the family weakens as it tries to resist the influence of German colonists. The family loses its fortunes, ethnic culture, and identity. The historical context is not supported by academic research, but a product of imaginary and romantic reconstruction. The author presents much ethnographic data and describes old customs and traditions with loving detail. As the Lithuanian culture gradually and unavoidably disappears under relentless pressure from the Germans, the struggle between two cultures becomes surrounded by a fatalistic aura, but is still painful and hurtful every step of the way.

Vilius Karalius (Vilius King), a two-volume work published in 1936 and 1956, is somewhat similar to Aukštujų Šimonių likimas. The novel also tracks the lives of several generations of Prussian Lithuanians, but is distinguished by psychological and social observations. Simonaitytė wrote several autobiographical books: Be tėvo (Without a Father, 1941), ... O buvo taip (It Was Thus..., 1960), Ne ta pastogė (A different Home, 1962), Nebaigta knyga (Unfinished book, 1965). Simonaitytė's biggest weaknesses included excessive wordiness, tendency towards sentimentality, and, in later works, use of clichés of socialist realism. Her works were censored and continuously revised by Soviet authorities; for example, it took six years of revisions to meet requirements of Soviet ideology to publish Pikčiurnienė, a novel about a woman consumed by greed. The novel was turned into a grotesque portrayal of greed and cruelty among the privileged classes (kulak/buožė in Soviet terminology, in Russian and Lithuanian respectively), which was supposed to justify Soviet oppression.
