= Delmonas =

Waist purse in Lithuania Minor folk costumes

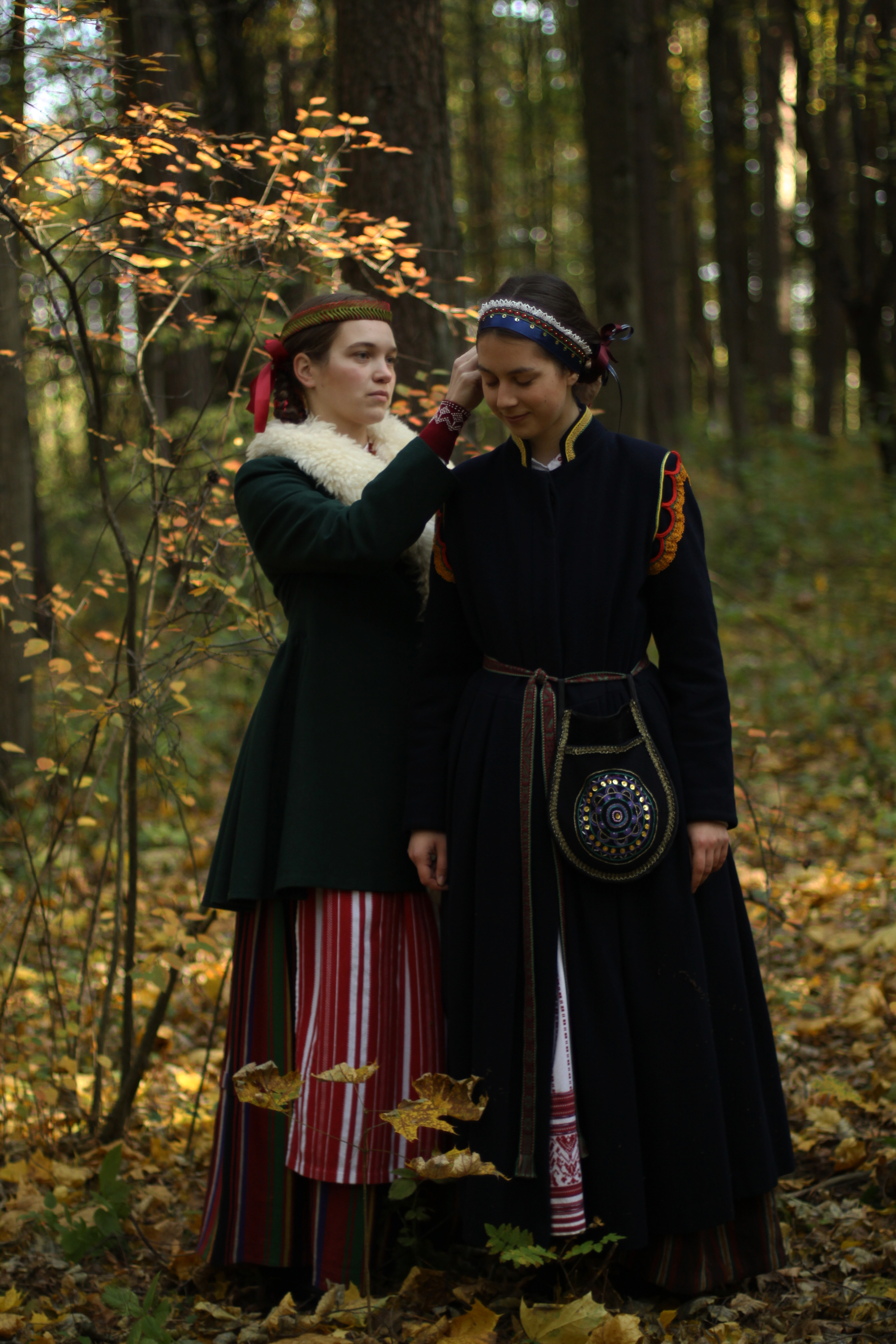
Traditional costume of Lithuania Minor with delmonas

Delmonas (or Dalmonas, plural delmonai) – is a detail of folk costume of women originating in Lithuania Minor. It is an elaborately decorated purse, visibly attached to the waist by a band. This costume feature represents the Prussian Lithuanians and is not common to other ethnographic regions of Lithuania. In 2019, Delmonai of Lithuania Minor were inscribed into the Intangible Cultural Heritage Inventory of Lithuania as a form of folk art, traditional craftsmanship, or agricultural activities.

== Traditional appearance ==
Delmonas was usually sewn from velvet, wool, silk or cotton. Traditionally the color of fabric was dark, and delmonas was embroidered using colorful threads and glass beads. Embroidery usually depicted flowers or other plants, birds, and sometimes the initials of the owner. Also some meaningful quotes, dates or initials, sometimes figurines could be embroidered on a rectangle, rounded, flare, wavy bottom, trapezium, multiangular or other shape pocket. Delmonai were usually embroidered by the women of Lithuania Minor themselves; however, they could also order delmonai from a tailor as well.

== Usage and history ==
Worn at the end of the 18th century – beginning of the 20th century – when region was a part of the Kingdom of Prussia – delmonai served a certain practical function. Women could store small items while doing house chores or use it as a pocket going outside. This practical feature was not hidden at first – dalmonai was the most decorated item of the costume. However, during various political turmoil women of Lithuania Minor started to wear dalmonai secretly. They would be hidden under the skirt and used to hide money, documents or letters, especially for women who were willing or forced to leave their homeland. Many of such women would pass delmonai to younger generations, who would then donate them for various museums of Lithuania. Women of Klaipėda city reportedly continued to wear delmonai up to 1940s. The popularity of delmonai was restored in the revival of folk costume in 1960s and 1970s. Being used as a sign of Lithuania Minor identity, delmonai are also used as a modern accessory, continuing the uninterrupted production in Klaipėda region.

== Gallery ==
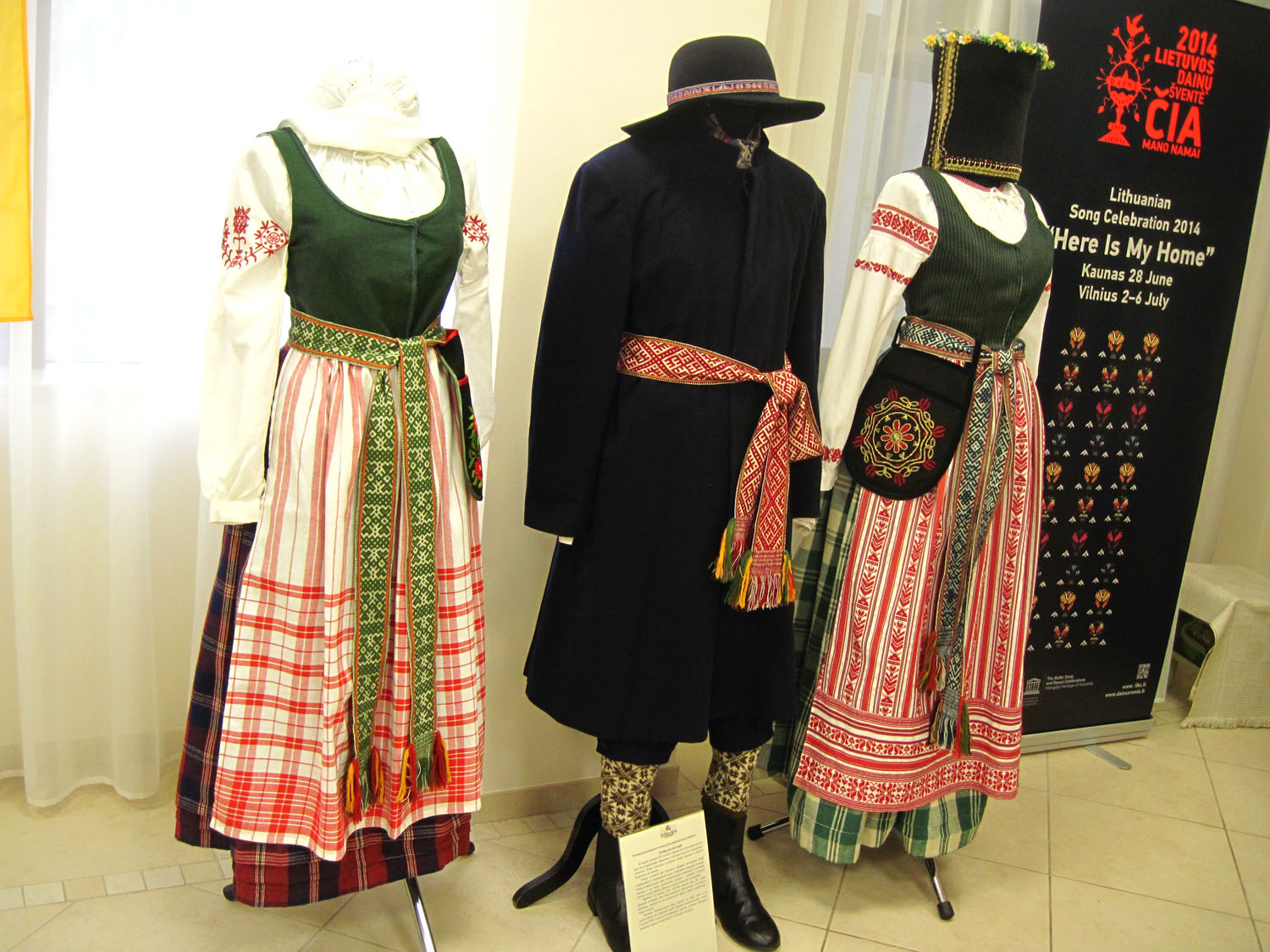
Examples of folk costumes from Lithuania Minor. Dalmonas is shown as a part of woman's costume

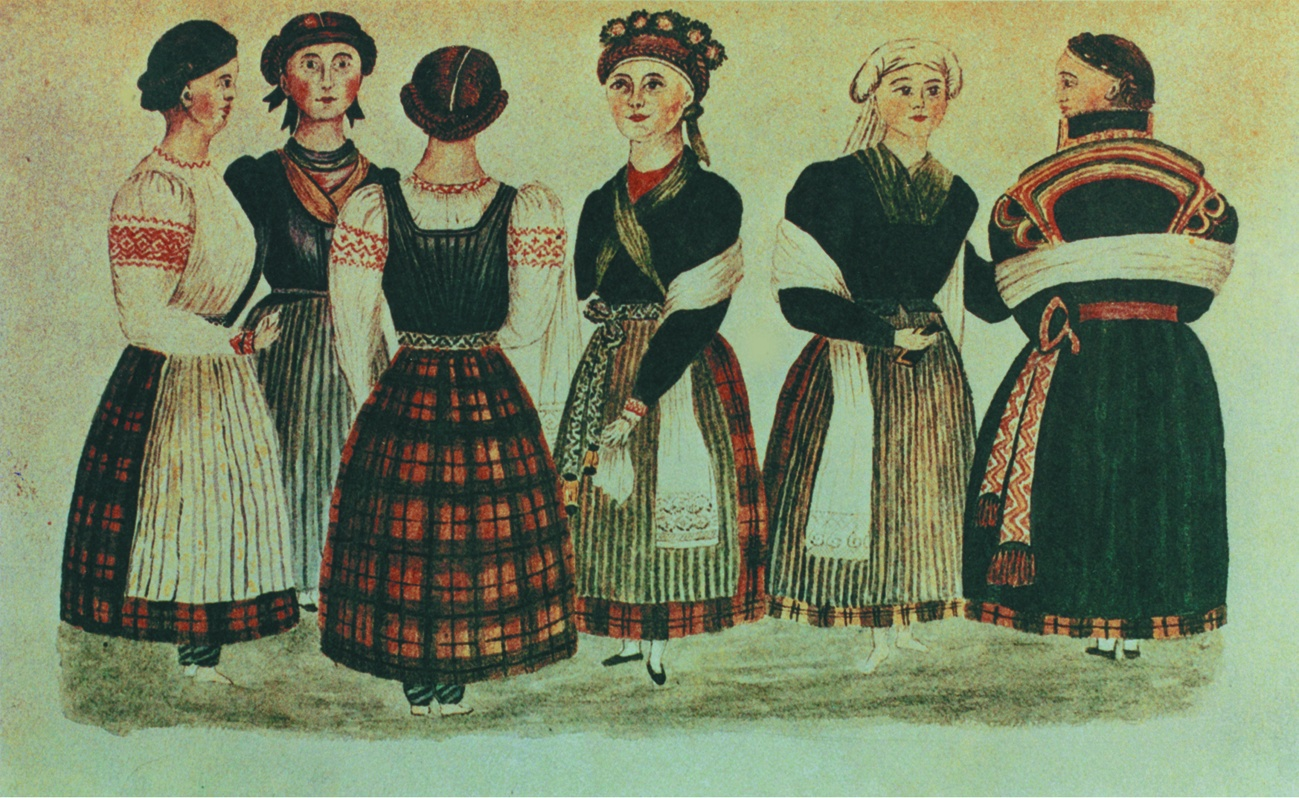
19th Century Prussian Lithuanians with national costumes

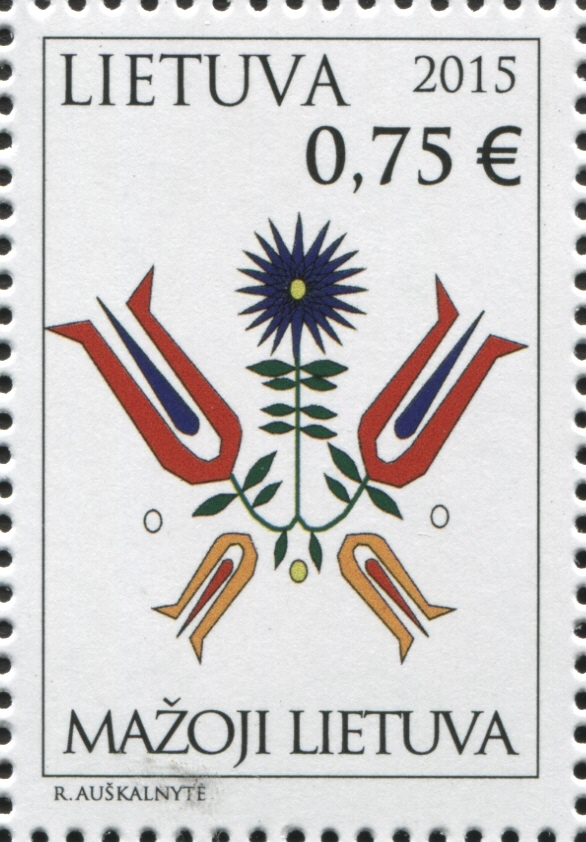
2015 Lithuanian postage stamp, commemorating the traditional embroidery of delmonas
