= Georg Sauerwein =

German publisher, polyglot, poet and linguist

- Sauerwein, c. 1865
- Born: Georg Julius Justus Sauerwein; 15 January 1831; Hanover
- Died: 16 December 1904 (aged 73); Kristiania
- Known for: Polyglottism

Georg Julius Justus Sauerwein (15 January 1831 in Hanover – 16 December 1904 in Kristiania) was a German publisher, polyglot, poet, and linguist. He is buried at Gronau.

Sauerwein was the greatest linguistic prodigy of his time and mastered about 75 languages.

== Biography ==
His father was a Lutheran minister of the Evangelical-Lutheran State Church of Hanover, serving in Hanover, Schmedenstedt and Gronau upon Leine. From 1843 to 1848 Sauerwein went to the Gymnasium (comprehensive secondary school) in Hanover. At the age of 17, he studied Linguistics and Theology at Göttingen, but discontinued his studies in 1851 without completing a degree. At age 24 he published an English-Turkish dictionary. In 1873 he was appointed honorary doctor of the George Augustus University of Göttingen.

During the years 1852–1860, Sauerwein made a living in private tutorships; first in Wales, where his introduction to Welsh culture and British concepts of freedom came to set the course of his future commitment to cultural and educational policy. In 1857 he got a position as the private tutor of princess Elisabeth of Wied, who later was to become the celebrated Queen of Romania.

Later he earned his living as a correspondent counsellor of languages for the British and Foreign Bible Society. During the years 1857–1896, Sauerwein checked and revised a dozen translations for the British and Foreign Bible Society and translated parts of the Old Testament to Madagascan and the Gospel according to St. John to Kabyle.

As an acknowledged pacifist, Sauerwein was involved in opposition to what he perceived as the imperialism of German Empire Germany under the Kaiser. He was a supporter of the minority languages within the German Empire: Sorbian in Brandenburgian Lower Lusatia and Lithuanian in East Prussian Lithuania Minor.

He stayed frequently in Spreewald near Berlin and in Memel (Klaipėda) and Tilsit, where he stood forth as poet, public orator and politician. He ran as a candidate for the Prussian House of Representatives four times and once for the Parliament of Germany, but was never elected. He was accused of being in league both with the Welfish (separatist for re-establishing the independent Kingdom of Hanover) and the Pan Slavonic cause; both considered by the governors to be a threat to German culture and identity. The authorities and the press charged him with unpatriotic activity. In vain he claimed to the contrary that he served his nation by trying to remove the very circumstance that nourished the Pan Slavonic movement — the suppression of minorities. If allowed to be left in peace with their own culture, they would stay as loyal citizens as ethnic Germans themselves, he argued.

In accordance with the Romantic spirit, Sauerwein believed that poetry was rooted in popular tradition and that fresh literature could be based on minority languages. His own poetry and songs are based on this idea, and he came to be among the pioneers of Lithuanian and Sorbian literature with the epic poem "Nemunyciai" (The Memel People, 1894) and "Serbske stucki" (Sorbian Songs, 1877). His poem Lietuvninkais mes esam' gime ("As Lithuanians we are born", 1879) is still popular in Lithuania as a national hymn.

For many years Sauerwein carried on his battle against what he termed German hyper-nationalism, and this battle was mainly fought from Norway — a country that became his second homeland. He felt unsafe in Germany and described his sojourns in Norway as an exile of his own choice. Moreover, in Norway, he had access to a free press and by the turn of the previous century, he was often given space in Norwegian publications to report on the conditions in Lithuania and Lusatia.

Out of the last thirty years of his life (1874–1904), Sauerwein spent 11 in Norway — mostly in Dovre, which he characterized as “my winter sanatorium and laboratory of mental effusions”, but he also stayed increasingly in the capital Christiania (Oslo). He was excited about the New Norwegian movement for language and nationality, where he saw common features with the Baltic and Slavonic cultural rising. He made this the theme of several articles and publications, both in Danish and Norwegian. Best known is his anthology of verse in the local dialect of Dovre — the first full volume in the idiom of the Gudbrandsdalen valley. Similarly, as in Lithuania and Lusatia, Sauerwein wanted to revive the folk song in Gudbrandsdalen and make it a foundation for new poetry. This was his foremost intention with the "Frie Viso ifraa Vigguin" (Free Songs from the Mountain's Edge, 1885). The anthology is dedicated to the New Norwegian pioneer Ivar Aasen and it initiated a rich lyrical tradition in Gudbrandsdalen during the following decades. The message is revealed by its title: Free songs in a free language about and for a free people. The poet pays his tribute to the free Norwegian society and dare rebuke the lack of such freedom in Germany without risking censorship.

In his last years, Sauerwein dedicated himself to the peace cause as a publicist and orator — among other fora — in the Christiania Peace Society.

== Polyglottism ==
Apart from his mother language German, Sauerwein could read, write and speak, about 75 languages including, at least the following:

Latin, ancient Greek, modern Greek, Hebrew, French, Italian, Spanish, Basque, Portuguese, English, Welsh, Cornish, Irish, Scottish Gaelic, Manx Gaelic, Dutch, Danish, Icelandic, Norwegian, Swedish, Sami, Finnish, Estonian, Latvian, Lithuanian, Polish, Russian, Belarusian, Ukrainian, Czech, Slovak, Bulgarian, Sorbian, Serbian, Croatian, Hungarian, Romanian, Albanian, Turkish, Azerbaijani, Chuvash (a Turkic language), Tamil, Kashgar (spoken in Siberia, similar to the language of Uzbekistan), Kumyk (spoken in the Caucasus), Persian, Armenian, Georgian, Sanskrit, Romani, Hindustani, Ethiopian, Tigrinya (another language of Ethiopia), Coptic or ancient Egyptian, Arabic, Malagasy (the language of Madagascar), Malay, Samoan, Hawaiian, different dialects of Chinese, and Aneityum (a language spoken in the New Hebrides).

== Legacy ==
In Gronau an archive of his work is maintained and a Realschule (secondary school) is named for him. There are Sauerwein-streets in Gronau, Hanover, Burg im Spreewald, Dovre, Norway, Klaipėda and Šilutė, Lithuania. Lithuanian national liberation movement Sąjūdis has used the melody of the Lithuanians we are born in its television broadcasting trailer since 1988.

== Publications by Sauerwein ==
Sauerwein published several of his main works under the pseudonyms Girėnas and Pacificus.

- A Pocket Dictionary of the English and Turkish Languages. By G. Sauerwein. London 1855.
- Serbske stucki. Wot Dr. Sauerweina. Budysin 1877.
- Der Spreewald, Fragment aus einem altgriechischen Gedicht über denselben, bei Gelegenheit und zur Feier der 11. deutschen Anthropologen-Versammlung in Berlin nach eignem alten Codex rescriptus Spreewaldensis zum ersten Male herausgegeben und mit einer Uebersetzung und einigen Noten versehen von G. J. J. S. Göttingen 1880.
- Frie Viso ifraa Vigguin sungje i Nørdre-Gudbrandsdalsk Dølamaal taa Dr. G.J.J. Sauerwein. Kristiania 1885. 2nd ed. by J.T. Lindsøe. Dovre 2006.
- Die Littauische Frage einiger Zeitungen mit einer deutschen und littauischen Antwort. As Girėnas. Tilsit 1888.
- Le Livre des Salutations adressées aux Nations Orientales et Occidentales composé pour le VIIIième Congrès des Orientalistes qui se réunira à Stockholm en 1889. As Girėnas. Leipzig 1888.
- Au dernier Moment. Postscriptum du Livre des Salutations adressé au Congrès des Orientalistes. As Girėnas. Leipzig 1889.
- West-östliches Stammbuch. Zu Mirza Schaffy's siebzigstem Geburtstage 22. April 1889. As Girėnas. Leipzig 1889.
- Immanuel Kant und Ludwig Windthorst in Bezug auf angemessene Behandlung und angemessenen Unterricht eines fremdsprachigen Volks und die schulseitige Bekämpfung des Socialismus. As Girėnas. Christiania 1891.
- Ueber einige Verirrungen und Mißgriffe neuester Cultur. Ein Hülferuf zu Gunsten vieler armen Kinder und Eltern an die große deutsche Nation. As Girėnas. Christiania 1891.
- Ueber littauisches Volksthum und littauische Volkstracht. As Girėnas. Tilsit 1894.
- Drei patriotische Reden aus dem schönen Jahre 1871, gehalten an Kaisers Geburtstag, am Friedensfest und beim Einzug der Krieger zu Gronau a. d. Leine by Dr. G. Sauerwein (as Girėnas). Hildesheim 1896.
- From Árya to Eire, from Mánu to Man. The Queen Victoria Birth-Day Polyglot Peace Album. The Nations' Undiplomatic Concert of Languages. Polyglot Peace Album in Memory of the 80th Birth-Day of Her Majesty Queen Victoria Empress of India Jaitrigrantha. Leipzig 1899.
- Sprogstudier og skaldskab i fredssagens tjeneste. (Foredrag af dr. G. Sauerwein i fredsforeningen paa Nobeldagen.) Christiania 1903.
- Laetare. A Congratulation to Kymdeithas on the occasion of her first centenary as being also the most genuine missionary society, the most promising peace society and the greatest linguist in the world by Pacificus. Kristiania 1904.
- Juro Surowin: Wsyknym by ksel tolmacys. Wuberk basnjow. Ed. F. Metsk. Budysyn 1975.
- Juro Surowin: Sol zemje. Wuberk proze. Ed. F. Metsk. Budysyn 1978.
- Nemunyciai.
- Kaip azuols druts prie Nemunelio. Vilnius 1986, pp. 99–217. (Manuscript 1894)
- Serbska poezija 29. Juro Surowin. Ed. K. Lorenc. Budysin 1991.
- Sauerwein-Gedichte. Rugstaus vyno eilerasciai. Ed. A. Franzkeit and J. Skliutauskas. Ratingen 1993.

== Publications about Sauerwein ==
- Basanavicius, J./Kaunas, D.: Medega d-ro Jurgio Sauerweino biografijai. Vilnius 2001.
- Dalitz, R.H./Stone, G.: Contributions from English and Welsh Sources to the Biography of Georg Sauerwein. Letopis Instituta za serbski ludospyt A 31/2. Bautzen 1984, pp. 182–206.
- Kaunas, D.: Knygos kultura ir kurejas. Vilnius 2009.
- Koch, G. (ed.): I. Internationales Sauerwein-Symposion 8.11.–11.11.1990. Gronau 1994.
- Kuzmickas, V./Seselgis, A.: Jurgis Zauerveinas. Medziaga bibliografijai. Vilnius 1975.
- Marti, R. (ed.): Sauerwein – Girenas – Surowin. II. Internationales Sauerwein-Symposion 21.–26. November 1995. Hildesheim, Zürich, New York 1996.
- Masalskis, H.: Das Sprachgenie Georg Sauerwein – Eine Biographie. Oldenburg 2003.
- Sauerwein, G.: Zur Biographie des hannoverschen Sprachgenies Georg Sauerwein. Hannover 2006.
- Urbonaviciute, V. (ed.): Georgas Sauerweinas ir lietuviu tautos atgimimas XIX a. pabaigoje. IV tarptautinis G. Sauerweino mokslinis simpoziumas Klaipedoje 2004 m. lapkricio 12–13 d. Klaipėda 2005.
- Vistdal, O.: Georg Sauerwein – europear og døl. Ein dokumentasjon. Bergen 2000.
- Vistdal, O. (ed.): III. Internationales Sauerwein-Symposion 8.–12.8.2000. Dovre 2003.
