= Zaunius =

- Lithuanian surname
- m.: Zaunius
- f.: (unmarried): Zauniūtė
- f.: (married): Zaunienė

Zaunius is a Lithuanian surname derived from the nickname zaunius, from the verb zaunyti, "to talk nonsense, to whine". Notable people with the surname include:

- Dovas Zaunius (senior) (1845–1921), public figure in Lithuania Minor and Lithuania, a press worker
- Dovas Zaunius (1892–1940), lawyer, political figure of Lithuania Minor, Lithuanian diplomat
- Marta Zauniūtė (1875–1945), cultural and press worker of Lithuania Minor, bibliographer.
- Vincė Jonuškaitė-Zaunienė (1901–1997), Lithuanian mezzo-soprano opera singer
