= Jurgis Strėkys =

Prussian Lithuanian activist (1861–1938)

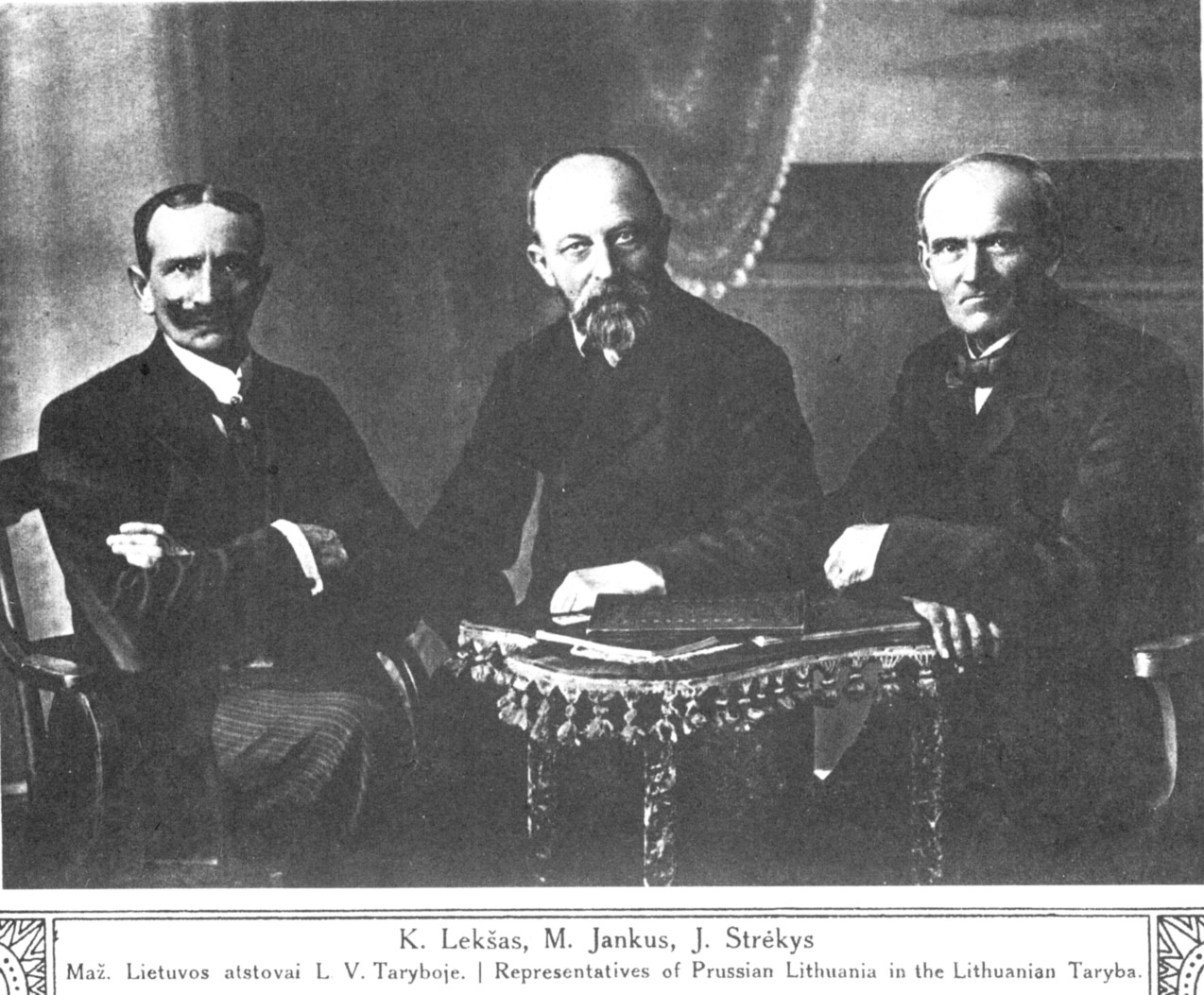
- Prussian Lithuanians in the Council of Lithuania (Strėkys on the right)
- Born: 27 April 1861; Kekersai, East Prussia
- Died: November 1938 (aged 77); Jakšteliai, Lithuania
- Occupation: Activist
- Awards: Order of the Lithuanian Grand Duke Gediminas

Jurgis Strėkys or Strekies (27 April 1861 – November 1938) was a Prussian Lithuanian activist.

Strėkys made a living as a farmer, but he was active in the political and cultural life of Prussian Lithuanians. He was the long-term chairman of the Šilutė District Election Society, one of the Lithuanian Conservative Election Societies, and organized collection of signatures under petitions to protect the Lithuanian language in schools in 1891, 1895, and 1900. After World War I, he supported Lithuanian efforts to unite Lithuania Minor with Lithuania Proper. As a member of the National Council of Lithuania Minor, he was coopted by the Council of Lithuania in March 1920. Strėkys was vice-chairman of the Supreme Committee for the Salvation of Lithuania Minor organized to facilitate the Klaipėda Revolt in January 1923.

Strėkys was a member of various Prussian Lithuanian organizations, including Birutė Society and Sandora Society. He assisted in organizing the Lithuanian exhibition at the 1900 Paris Exposition. Later in life, he was a preacher of the Gemeinschaftsbewegung (Community Movement).

== Biography ==
Strėkys was born on 27 April 1861 in Kekersai, East Prussia (present-day Šilutė District Municipality in Lithuania). His family had long traditions in Gemeinschaftsbewegung (Community Movement), a Pietist movement in Lutheran churches.

=== Political activities ===
Strėkys joined the Lithuanian Conservative Election Societies and became the long-term chairman of the Šilutė District Election Society. Politically, it was a conservative society loyal to the German Empire and generally agreed with the German Conservative Party. Culturally, however, they opposed Germanisation. Strėkys was against closer integration and cooperation between the Lithuanian Election Societies which were based on the electoral districts.

Strėkys was one of the members of committees organizing signature collection on three petitions to protect the Lithuanian language and continue using it in schools. In 1891, Strėkys collected signatures for a petition sent to the Prussian Minister of Education Robert of Zedlitz-Trützschler. In 1895, he organized the largest Prussian Lithuanian petition with 27,800 signatures and was a member of the six-person delegation sent to Berlin to deliver the petition to the German Emperor; however, they failed to deliver the petition in-person. In 1900, Strėkys organized signature collection in Šilutė District under another petition to the Minister of Education Conrad von Studt.

In 1898, Strėkys unsuccessfully ran in the elections to the Prussian Landtag. In January 1912, he was a candidate to the German Reichstag. Strėkys received 5,809 votes but lost to Felix Schwabach of the National Liberal Party who received 8,750 votes. As part of his campaign, he published his seven-point election program and another appeal in 1911. Strėkys was criticized for not having clear and more distinctive political views.

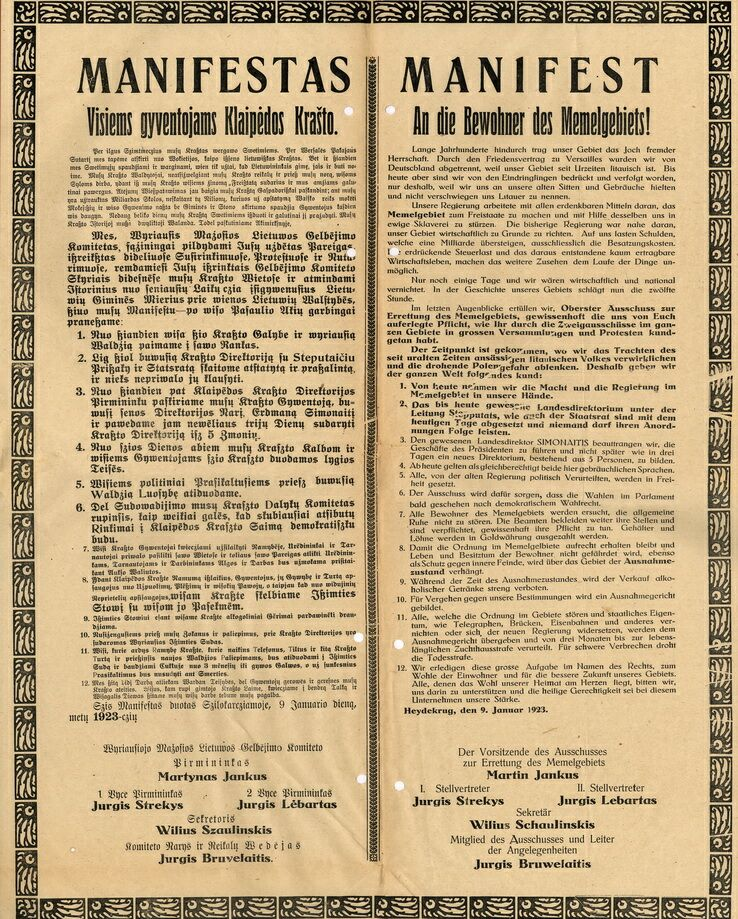
Bilingual manifest of the Supreme Committee for the Salvation of Lithuania Minor dated 9 January 1923 and signed by Strėkys

After World War I, he supported Lithuanian efforts to unite Lithuania Minor with Lithuania Proper. He joined the National Council of Lithuania Minor established in 1918. He also became a board member of the Prussian Lithuanian Association when it was reestablished in 1919. It worked closely with the National Council and published pro-Lithuanian newspapers Prūsų lietuvių balsas and Tarybos žinios. Strėkys and three other members of the National Council were coopted by the Council of Lithuania on 20 March 1920. This day was officially celebrated as the symbolic unification of all Lithuanians. Lithuania was able to gain control of the Klaipėda Region (small part of the Lithuania Minor) as a result of the Klaipėda Revolt in January 1923. Strėkys was vice-chairman of the Supreme Committee for the Salvation of Lithuania Minor organized to facilitate the revolt. He signed the Supreme Committee's bilingual manifest on 9 January 1923, but publicly recanted the signature on 14 January.

=== Cultural activities ===
Strėkys made a living as a farmer, but he was active in the cultural and political life of Prussian Lithuanians. He was one of the first members of the cultural Birutė Society established in 1885.

For the 1900 Paris Exposition, Lithuanians organized an exhibition. Strėkis was a member of a three-men committee in Tilsit (Sovetsk) which was particularly active in gathering the exhibits. The other two members were Martynas Jankus and Jonas Vanagaitis.

Strėkys was a members of various societies. He was a board member of the Writing and Reading Society (1898) established to publish Lithuanian books, but it quickly closed down. In 1904, he became one of the founders of the Sandora Society, a Lutheran charitable and cultural society. He also chaired local savings and loan societies in Vyžiai (1905) and Jakšteliai (1907). In 1913, he was a member of a committee that planned to construct a monument to the Lithuanian poet Kristijonas Donelaitis at his birthplace in Lasdinehlen.

After the Klaipėda Revolt in January 1923, Strėkys retired from political life and spent time preaching to the adherents of the Gemeinschaftsbewegung (Community Movement). In 1928, he was awarded the Order of the Lithuanian Grand Duke Gediminas. He died in November 1938 at his farm in Jakšteliai.
