= Vilius Gaigalaitis =

Lutheran priest and Prussian Lithuanian activist (1870–1945)

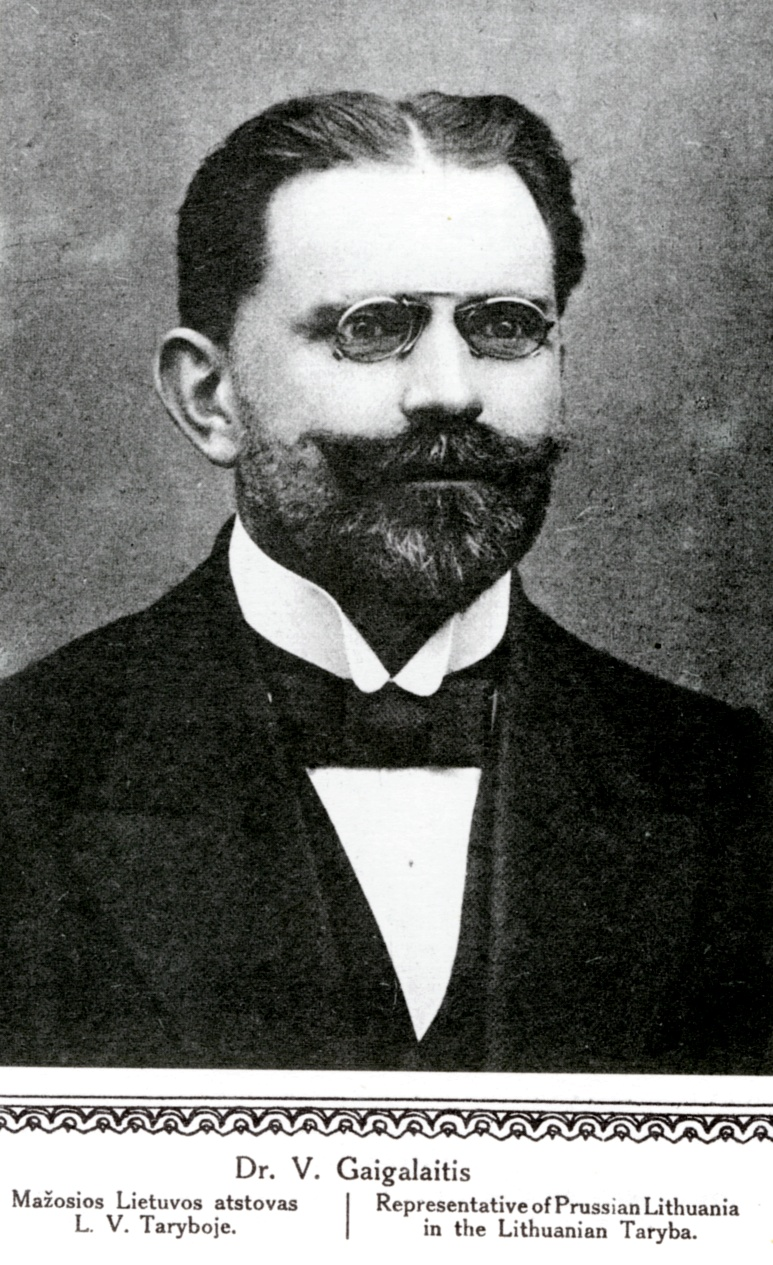
- Gaigalaitis in Lithuania Album (1921)
- Born: Wilhelm Gaigalat; 27 September 1870; Naujienos (Heydebruch), East Prussia, German Empire
- Died: 30 November 1945 (aged 75); Bretten, Allied-occupied Germany
- Education: University of Königsberg
- Occupations: Lutheran priest, activist, politician, university professor, book collector
- Political party: Lithuanian Conservative Election Societies
- Board member of: Sandora Society
- Awards: Order of the Lithuanian Grand Duke Gediminas; Order of the Three Stars

Vilius Gaigalaitis or Wilhelm Gaigalat (27 September 1870 – 30 November 1945) was a Lutheran priest and Prussian Lithuanian activist. He was a member of the Prussian House of Representatives (1903–1918), director of the consistory of the Evangelical Lutheran Church in Lithuania (1925–1933), and professor at Vytautas Magnus University (1925–1936).

Educated at the University of Königsberg, Gaigalaitis was ordained priest and received doctorate in philosophy in 1900. He worked as priest in Ramučiai (1900–1902), Priekulė (1902–1915), and Katyčiai (1915–1919). As a representative of the Lithuanian Conservative Election Societies, Gaigalaitis was elected to the Landtag of Prussia in 1903, 1908, and 1913. He aligned with the German Conservative Party and defended the use of the Lithuanian language in schools and churches. During World War I, he supported Lithuania's independence and the idea of uniting Lithuania Minor with Lithuania Proper. In 1918, he was elected chairman of the National Council of Lithuania Minor but did not sign the Act of Tilsit. After Lithuania gained control of the Klaipėda Region in January 1923, Gaigalaitis became a member of the Directorate of the Klaipėda Region but resigned within a year due to disagreements and withdrew from further political work.

Gaigalaitis was a member and co-founder of numerous cultural and educational Lithuanian societies. He was the long-term chairman of the Sandora Society and editor of its newspaper Pagalba. After World War I, he worked on establishing Lithuanian schools. He taught at the Faculty of the Evangelical Theology at Vytautas Magnus University from its establishment in 1925 to its closure in 1936. In 1925, he became the director of the consistory of the Evangelical Lutheran Church in Lithuania and took measures against pro-German priests.

Various Lithuanian schools and societies were liquidated after Lithuania lost Klaipėda Region to Nazi Germany in March 1939, destroying Gaigalaitis' life's work. He retreated to Lithuania and then to Germany where he died in Bretten in 1945. In total, Gaigalaitis published 25 books, including a study on Gemeinschaftsbewegung (Community Movement) among Prussian Lithuanians and the first Lithuanian-language work on poet Kristijonas Donelaitis.

== Biography ==
=== Early life and education ===
Born on 27 September 1870, Gaigalaitis was the youngest of nice children in a family of farmers in Naujienos (German: Heydebruch; present-day Naujininkai in Pagėgiai Municipality) near Vilkyškiai The village was then part of East Prussia which had a large Lithuanian-speaking minority of Prussian Lithuanians. The family owned 300 morgens of land (76.5 hectares or 189 acres). The family was affluent and Gaigalaitis sometimes presented himself as a son of petty nobility.

Gaigalaitis attended a primary school in Žukai starting in 1877. His first known article (a translation from German about Christian missionaries) was published in Keleivis supplement of Konzervatyvų draugystės laiškas in 1884 (at the age of 14). In 1886, he was tutored for nine months by priest Jonas Pipiras and successfully passed entrance examination to the Louise Gymnasium in Memel (now Klaipėda). A year later, he transferred to the realgymnasium in Tilsit (now Sovetsk) where, according to his memoirs, he organized a secret student group Baltija. In Tilsit, Gaigalaitis became acquainted with other Lithuanian activists, particularly those working to publish Varpas, and began contributing more actively to the Lithuanian press.

=== University studies ===
After graduating high school in 1892, Gaigalaitis chose to study theology and philosophy at the University of Königsberg. He also took classes on comparative linguistics, history, Lithuanian language. Linguistic professor Adalbert Bezzenberger had a formative influence on Gaigalaitis. In November 1894, he joined the Prussia Antiquity Society. He studied for six months at the University of Berlin (there is conflicting information whether he studied linguistic or agricultural subjects).

To become a priest, Gaigalaitis had to pass two examinations – pro licentia concionandi (for delivering sermons) an pro ministerio (for the ministry). There was a mandatory 18-month waiting period between these exams. During this time, Gaigalaitis attended six-week courses at the teacher's seminary in Ragnit (now Neman) and taught in primary schools.

In June 1900, he received doctorate of philosophy from the University of Königsberg for his thesis on the Wolfenbütteler Postil (newly discovered Lithuanian manuscript from 1573). Gaigalaitis chose the topic under the influence of Adalbert Bezzenberger who helped him obtain financial assistance from the German government. The thesis was published in the journal of the Lithuanian Literary Society. It was a linguistic, not theological work.

=== Career ===
==== Religion ====
Gaigalaitis was ordained priest in June 1900. He accepted a position as an assistant priest (Hilfsprediger) in Eidaičiai, but it was a small and remote village with no church. When a small church was built in nearby Ramučiai, Gaigalaitis relocated there (a Lutheran parish in Ramučiai was established in 1902). In April 1902, he became the second priest of the much larger and more established parish in Priekulė. In 1904, Endrikis Endrulaitis became the first priest of the parish. He was active in the Lithuanian press and collaborated with Gaigalaitis, but was skeptical of the Lithuanian National Revival. In October 1915, Gaigalaitis became priest in Katyčiai. Due to increased social and political involvement, he left active pastoral work in March 1919. He then moved to Memel (Klaipėda) where he lived until 1940.

In June 1925, Gaigalaitis was elected by the synod of the Evangelical Lutheran Church in Lithuania to the church's consistory. Despite protests from the German and Latvian members of the congregation, President of Lithuania appointed Gaigalaitis as president of the consistory. He served in this position until 1933 and took measures against pro-German priests. For such policies, Gaigalaitis was frequently attacked by German priests. In 1928, Kurt Ballerstedt published a brochure Die evangelisch-lutherische Kirche in Litauen im Kampf um ihre Freiheit (The Evangelical Lutheran Church in Lithuania in the Fight for its Freedom) with a foreword by Gustav Adolf Deissmann. Gaigalaitis responded by publishing his own brochure the following year which highlighted struggles of the church in 1925–1929.

In 1937, he attended the World Conference on Church, Community and State in Oxford (the second conference of the Life and Work movement) and delivered a presentation arguing that priests should not get involved in national conflicts.

==== Politics ====
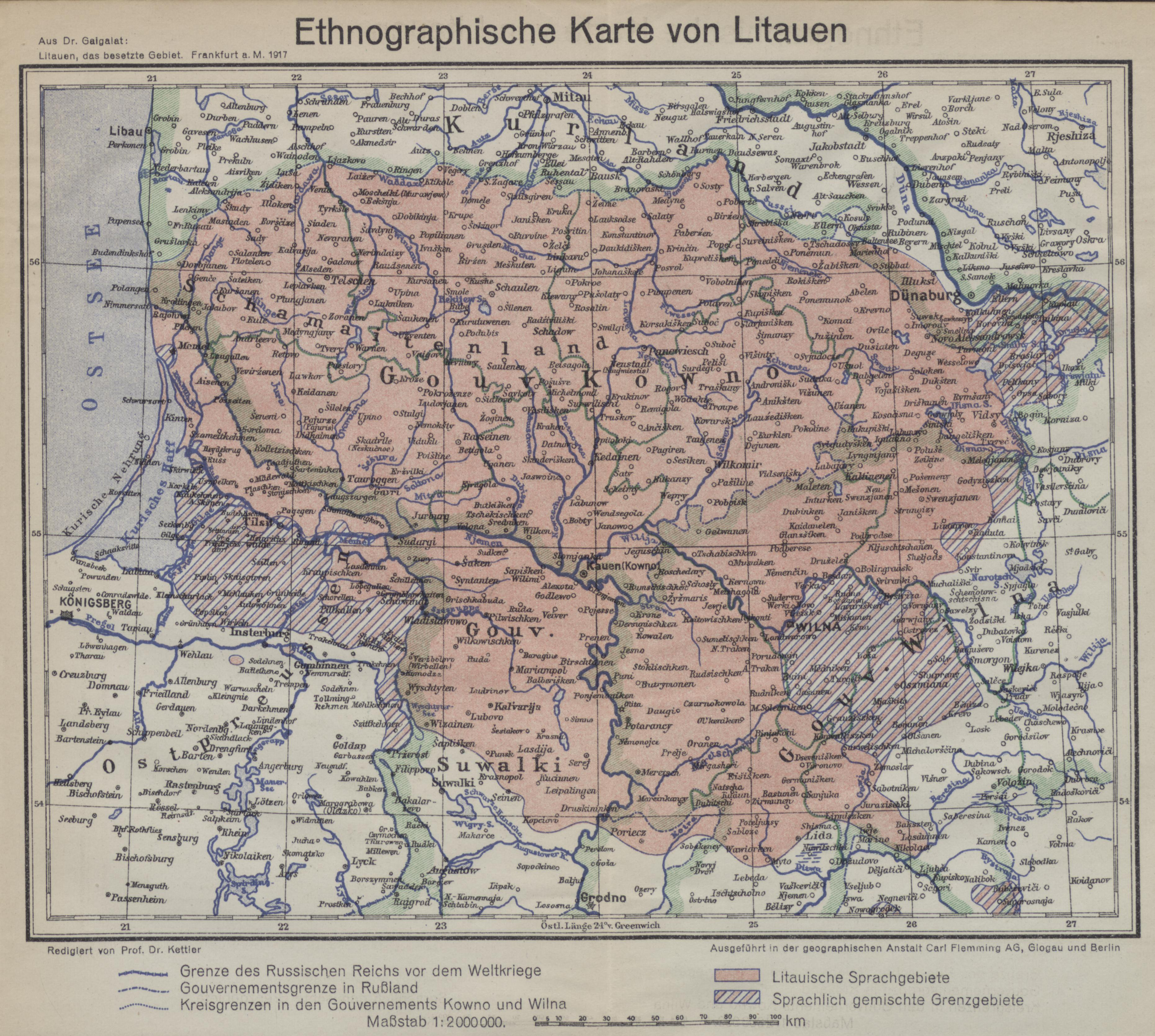
Map of ethnographic Lithuania published by Gaigalaitis in 1917

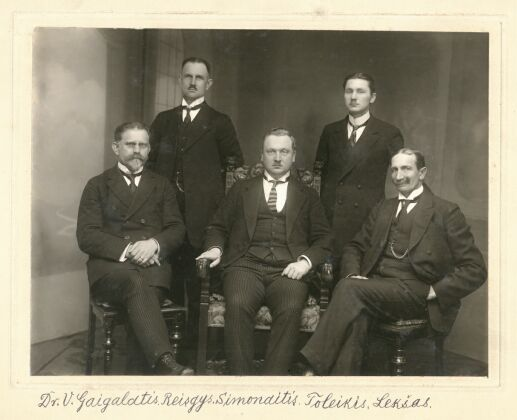
Directorate of the Klaipėda Region: Gaigalaitis sits first from the left

In 1903, Gaigalaitis as a representative of the Lithuanian Conservative Election Societies, was elected to the Prussian House of Representatives of the Landtag of Prussia. He was reelected in 1908 and 1913 serving until 1918. Initially, he joined the fraction of the German Conservative Party but later identified as an independent. According to his memoirs, during his years at the Landtag, he delivered 14 more notable speeches, particularly on the issues of the Lithuanian language in schools and churches. While in Berlin, he promoted Lithuanian culture. For example, he organized an exhibition of Lithuanian folk art in 1910 and lectures about Lithuania.

During World War I, when Germany occupied most of present-day Lithuania, Gaigalaitis published a political brochure The Lithuanian–Baltic Question (Die litauisch-baltische Frage) in which he argued that Germany should create a German-controlled buffer state from the Governorates of Vilna, Kovno, and Suwałki. At the time, he did not want to incorporate Prussian Lithuanians into this polity. In 1917, he published a more comprehensive treatise Lithuania: the Occupied Land (Litauen das besetzte Gebiet) in support of Lithuania's independence. The book included a map of ethnographic Lithuania that encompassed both Lithuania Minor and Lithuania Proper. He was also a member of the German–Lithuanian Society that published newspaper Das neue Litauen which supported Lithuania's independence, but only if Lithuania was dependent on Germany.

On 16 November 1918, Gaigalaitis was elected chairman of the National Council of Lithuania Minor which adopted the Act of Tilsit that called for the unification of Lithuania Minor and Lithuania Proper into a single independent Lithuanian state. However, due to political backlash, Gaigalaitis refused to take the post and did not sign the act though he generally was supportive of the idea. Few weeks later, he became chairman of the National Council. Gaigalaitis faced pressure from the German police and fled to Kaunas, the temporary capital of Lithuania, in July 1919. There, he worked as an editor of the government's official newspaper Lietuva.

He returned to Klaipėda Region when it was taken over by the French administration as a mandate of the League of Nations in early 1920. He more eagerly joined the Lithuanian efforts of uniting Klaipėda Region with Lithuania, though he wanted to preserve autonomy for the region. On 20 March 1920, Gaigalaitis and three other members of the National Council of Lithuania Minor were coopted by the Council of Lithuania. It was a symbolic measure to show political support for the idea of unification. Gaigalaitis went on two diplomatic missions regarding the Klaipėda Region: for consultations to the United Kingdom in 1921 and as a leader of a delegation of Prussian Lithuanians to the Conference of Ambassadors in November 1922.

After Lithuania gained control of the Klaipėda Region in January 1923, Gaigalaitis became a member of the Directorate of the Klaipėda Region. He was its member from February to December 1923 and primarily worked on religious and educational matters. He drafted the law on the use of the Lithuanian language in schools. Lithuanians wanted to impose stricter Lithuanian language requirements, while Gaigalaitis supported region's autonomy and more moderate approach. Political disagreements led to his resignation from the directorate in December 1923 and withdrawal from further political activities.

Gaigalaitis' political activities attracted criticism. Germans accused him of chauvinism and being a traitor. Lithuanians criticized him for not being sufficiently Lithuanian and for supporting autonomy of the Klaipėda Region. In particular, Gaigalaitis quarreled with Martynas Jankus and Jonas Vanagaitis, two other pro-Lithuanian Prussian Lithuanians.

==== Societies ====
In 1904, together with others, Gaigalaitis established charitable, cultural, and educational Sandora Society. He was its chairman (until 1940) and editor of its newspaper Pagalba. The society maintained shelters for the disabled, Sunday schools, supported impoverished students, organized church choirs, etc. One of the shelters, established in 1934, now bears his name and continues to operate in Gargždai. The Sandora Society also published 30 books and brochures.

He was a member of many other societies, including Birutė Society (supported its library), Lithuanian Literary Society (became its board member by 1911), Lithuanian Scientific Society in Vilnius (1907–1914), and Spauda Society in Tilsit (1914–1922). When the Spauda Society organized the Lithuanian daily Prūsų lietuvių balsas in 1919, Gaigalaitis donated 21,000 marks for the cause.

In 1913, in preparation for the 200th birth anniversary of poet Kristijonas Donelaitis, Gaigalaitis published the first biography of Donelaitis and raised money for the construction of his monument on Rambynas. However, it was not built due to World War I. During the war, he raised funds for the Prussians deported to Siberia.

He co-founded Aukuras Society to promote Lithuanian culture (1922). In 1924, he was co-founded the Society of the Museum of the Klaipėda Region. He was its chairman until 1939. The society supported the Museum of the Klaipėda Region which opened in 1931 and displayed mainly archaeological artifacts. Gaigalaitis was a representative of the British and Foreign Bible Society in Lithuania (1924–1937). He was also a member and for a time chairman of the Society of Lithuanian–Latvian Unity. Gaigalaitis was one of the leaders of the Klaipėda chapter of the Lithuanian Red Cross established in 1935.

==== Education ====
In 1922, Gaigalaitis initiated the first Lithuanian gymnasium in Memel (now Klaipėda Vytautas Magnus Gymnasium) and was its first principal (until 1924). He was co-founder and long-term chairman of the Society of Schools in Klaipėda Region established in 1926. When Klaipėda Region was attached to Lithuania, it had 241 primary schools but only one of them taught in Lithuanian. Lack of Lithuanian teachers and resistance from German parents made it difficult to change the language of instruction. Therefore, the society established and maintained private primary schools in the region. In 1938, the society had 60 schools with 2,520 students. In 1934, he established courses for preachers and choirmasters in Klaipėda.

Gaigalaitis and others worked to establish the Faculty of the Evangelical Theology at Vytautas Magnus University in Kaunas. The faculty was established in April 1925. The first three lecturers (including Gaigalaitis) were hired in September 1925. Povilas Jakubėnas (member of the Lithuanian Evangelical Reformed Church) was dean of the faculty, except for the 1927/1928 school year when Gaigalaitis took over the post. Gaigalaitis did not live in Kaunas, and instead commuted from Klaipėda. He worked at the faculty until its closure on 15 September 1936. He taught classes on Christian missions, sociology, liturgy, ethics, exegesis, apologetics, catechesis, and pastoral theology.

=== Later life and death ===
After Lithuania lost Klaipėda Region to Nazi Germany in March 1939, Gaigalaitis' life's work was destroyed by the Nazis – various schools and societies (including Sandora Society) were liquidated. He feared arrest by the Gestapo. He moved to Kretinga in January 1940 and worked as a priest of Gargždai parish. His health was failing and he required treatments in sanatoriums.

In February 1941, after the Soviet occupation of Lithuania, he expatriated to Germany using his wife's citizenship. They were questioned by the police, passed through a filtration camp, and were prohibited from living with his wife's relatives in Frankfurt. Eventually, they settled in Bretten in present-day Baden-Württemberg. Gaigalaitis lived under police supervision and spent time writing his memoirs (published in 1998). He died there on 30 November 1945. According to his last will, his and his wife's remains were reburied in Elniškė Cemetery near Priekulė on 26 March 1994.

== Publications ==
In total, Gaigalaitis published 23 books (18 in Lithuanian and five in German). The content of these books varied: academic studies, popular works on Christian morality, educational books on popular science, alphabet books, travel impressions, promotion of teetotalism.

=== Academic studies ===
In 1904, Gaigalaitis published a study on Gemeinschaftsbewegung (Community Movement) among Prussian Lithuanians. The following year it was translated to Lithuanian as Evangeliški surinkimai Lietuvoje. The movement emerged in the 18th century based on ideas of Pietism and customs of the expelled Salzburg Protestants. According to Gaigalaitis, he spent nine years gathering data and interviewing movement's participants. It remains a valuable historical source and dominates Lithuanian historiography on the subject.

Gaigalaitis had a life-long interest in Lithuanian bibliography. When Silvestras Baltramaitis published his bibliography of Lithuanian books in 1892, Gaigalaitis wrote its review in Varpas and identified 62 missing entries – 58 books and four periodicals. In his personal library, he had 37 of the missing entries. One of these entries (a translation of a short story by Jodocus Temme) is known only from this review. The following year, he published a critical review of historical sources and books on the history of Lithuania in Vienybė lietuvninkų. Starting in 1896, Gaigalaitis compiled bibliography index for journal Mitteilungen der Litauischen literarischen Gesellschaft published by the Lithuanian Literary Society. Such work culminated in a bibliographic review and history of the Lithuanian press Lietuvos nusidavimai ir mūsų rašliava published in 1912. When Lithuania became independent, Gaigalaitis collaborated with Mykolas Biržiška and was one of the key sources for information on Lithuanian books published in Lithuania Minor.

In 1913, in preparation for the 200th birth anniversary of priest and poet Kristijonas Donelaitis, Gaigalaitis published his short biography and literary analysis of his key poem The Seasons. It was the first Lithuanian-language work on Donelaitis.

In early 1900s, Gaigalaitis studied the works of historian Simonas Daukantas from a linguistic perspective, but this work was not completed.

=== Book editor ===
Gaigalaitis edited several books. These include the two-volume Lithuanian translation of Lutheran agenda published in 1897. He edited the Lithuanian translation of the Bible published in 1908. This edition, published in roman and not the German blackletter, was intended for Lithuanians in Lithuania Proper and United States. He modernized the spelling, replaced barbarisms, etc. He also helped edit a collection of Lithuanian folk songs by Vilius Kalvaitis published in 1905. Gaigalaitis also collected folk songs and had a publication prepared in 1888, but it was not published.

=== Press articles ===
The first known article by Gaigalaitis was published when he was 14. He later contributed to numerous Lithuanian and German periodicals published in Lithuania Minor, Lithuania Proper, and Lithuanians in the United States. Since political articles could attract police attention, Gaigalaitis published under numerous pseudonyms which makes attribution of authorship difficult.

He most frequently contributed political articles from his work at the Landtag of Prussia to Lietuviška ceitunga, Lietuvos keleivis, and Nauja lietuviška ceitunga. He also published political articles in German Rheinisch-Westfälische Zeitung, Der Tag, and others. From 1905 to 1938, Gaigalaitis edited and contributed most of the content to the monthly Pagalba published by the Sandora Society.

== Personal library ==
Gaigalaitis was a bibliophile and owned a rich personal library of Lithuanian publications and works about Lithuania in other languages. After World War I, his personal library was merged with the library of the Sandora Society which had about 7,500 books and periodicals in 1939. The library included some old and rare publications, such as Postil of Jonas Bretkūnas (1591), hymnal by Daniel Klein (1704), dictionary by Philipp Ruhig (1747).

During World War II, the library was divided: about 300 books and a collection of periodicals was sold to the State Central Library, other items were taken to Germany, distributed to other collectors, or left to a local priest. Gaigalaitis took about 1,750 volumes with him to Germany. They did not include the old and rare publications (their fate is unknown). In his last will, he left those books to the library of Vytautas Magnus University. In 1956, those volumes were donated to the present-day Berlin State Library. They were catalogued and described by Jochen Dieter Range in 1980. After Lithuania regained independence in 1990, about 1,600 books were transferred to the Martynas Mažvydas National Library of Lithuania in 1997.

Gaigalaitis' personal archive was also dispersed. Some materials were left in Lithuania, others ended up in Germany, Switzerland, United States. Some items were returned from Switzerland with the archive of diplomat Albertas Gerutis. In 2022, relatives of Gaigalaitis transferred some of his personal archive to the Ieva Simonaitytė Public Library of Klaipėda County. The documents include manuscripts of memoirs, diaries, letters, photographs, a few personal effects.

== Awards ==
Gaigalaitis received the following awards:

- 1928: Order of the Lithuanian Grand Duke Gediminas (3rd degree)
- 1928: Independence Medal (Lithuania)
- 1930: Order of the Lithuanian Grand Duke Gediminas (2nd degree)
- 1933: Honorary Doctorate in Theology by the University of Latvia
- 1935: Order of the Three Stars (4th degree)

== Bibliography ==
- Barasa, Darius (2018). "Maldininkai Prūsijos Lietuvoje: masiškumas, išplitimas ir įvaizdis XIX a. trečiame dešimtmetyje". Senoji Lietuvos literatūra (in Lithuanian). 46: 141–169. ISSN 1822-3656.
- Čepėnas, Pranas, ed. (1972). Lietuvos Universitetas 1579–1803–1922 (in Lithuanian). Chicago: The Association of Lithuanian-American Professors. OCLC 2152067.
- Dykovienė, Asta (25 March 2022). "Krašto šviesuolio archyvas – Klaipėdoje" (in Lithuanian). Kauno diena.
- Juška, Albertas (2000–2009). "Vilius Gaigalaitis". Mažosios Lietuvos enciklopedija (in Lithuanian). Mokslo ir enciklopedijų leidybos centras.
- Karalienė, Viktorija. "Vilius Gaigalaitis – kunigas, politikas, visuomenės veikėjas (virtuali)" (in Lithuanian). Klaipėdos apskrities Ievos Simonaitytės viešoji biblioteka.
- Kaunas, Domas (1998). "Gyvenimas vardan tikėjimo ir lietuvybės: Viliaus Gaigalaičio būties ženklai". Atsiminimai. By Gaigalaitis, Vilius. Kaukienė, Audronė (ed.). (in Lithuanian). Klaipėda: Mažosios Lietuvos Fondas, Klaipėdos Universiteto leidykla. ISBN 9986-505-77-1.
- Kaunas, Domas (2007). "Viliaus Gaigalaičio knygotyrinės nuostatos ir veikla". Knygotyra (in Lithuanian). 48: 187–238. doi:10.15388/kn.v48i0.8124. ISSN 2345-0053.
- Kaunas, Domas (28 November 2023). "Klaipėdos krašto 100-metis: Lietuvos dalių suvienijimo prielaidos ir pasekmės" (PDF) (in Lithuanian). Lietuvos mokslų akademija.
- Petkūnas, Darius (2000–2009). "Sinodas". Mažosios Lietuvos enciklopedija (in Lithuanian). Mokslo ir enciklopedijų leidybos centras.
- Pulokas, Kęstutis (14 December 2020). "Kunigas dr. Vilius Gaigalaitis". Mokslo Lietuva (in Lithuanian). 21 (664): 10–11. ISSN 1392-7191.
- Strakauskaitė, Nijolė (1996). "Iš lietuviškosios Viliaus Gaigalaičio veiklos Mažojoje Lietuvoje". Istorija (in Lithuanian). 34: 76–85. ISSN 2029-7181.
- Tamulynas, Linas; Žukas, Julus (2000–2009). "Klaipėdos krašto muziejus". Mažosios Lietuvos enciklopedija (in Lithuanian). Mokslo ir enciklopedijų leidybos centras.
- Žemaitaitis, Algirdas; Petkūnas, Darius (2000–2009). "Surinkimininkai". Mažosios Lietuvos enciklopedija (in Lithuanian). Mokslo ir enciklopedijų leidybos centras.
