= Morta =

Morta may refer to:

== People ==
- Morta of Lithuania, Queen of Lithuania (1253–1262)
- Morta Zauniūtė (1875-1945), Lithuanian culture activist in Lithuania Minor
- Piotr Paweł Morta (born 1959), Polish political activist

== Other ==
- Morta (mythology), the goddess of death in Roman mythology
- Morta (wood), a semi-fossilized wood
- Morta, a hamlet in Prunelli-di-Fiumorbo, Corsica, France
- A character in the Star Trek episode "Rascals"

== See also ==
- Mortha
- Mortar (disambiguation)
