= Lithuanian Literary Society =

The Lithuanian Literary Society (German: Litauische literarische Gesellschaft) was a literary society dedicated to the Lithuanian language that was active from 1879 to about 1923 in Tilsit, East Prussia (now Sovetsk, Kaliningrad Oblast). It was the first scientific society dedicated to Lithuanian studies. It sought to document, preserve, and study Lithuanian language, folklore, literature, and cultural heritage. Members of the society were mostly non-Lithuanian scholars (linguists and philologists) and conducted its proceedings in German.

== Activities ==
It was established on October 14, 1879, in Tilsit by members of the Lithuanian Circle fellowship (Litauisches Kränzchen). Society members published scientific studies on the Lithuanian language and culture, collected and published examples of folklore (songs, fairy tales, etc.), collected samples of folk art and exhibited them in German institutions. From 1880 to 1912, the society published 31 issues of its journal Mitteilungen der Litauischen literarischen Gesellschaft. It also published 11 books. However, the society did not take a more active role in the Lithuanian National Revival: instead of trying to actively encourage and revive Lithuanian culture, it had a more fatalistic outlook and sought to record and preserve samples of what it considered to be a dying cultural heritage. Therefore, Lithuanian activists established their own societies and publications. However, Lithuanians did not establish their own learned society until 1907 when Jonas Basanavičius established the Lithuanian Scientific Society.

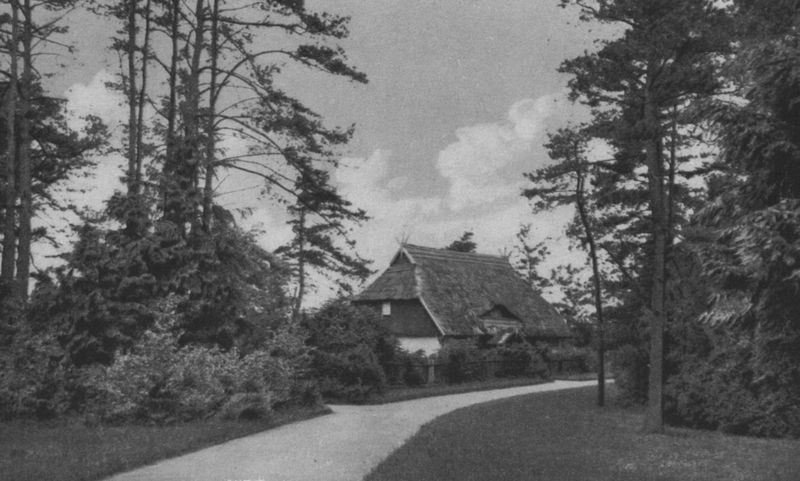
The Lithuanian House in the Jakobsruh Park

In 1905, the society constructed Lithuanian House (Litauer Heimathäuschen/Bauernhaus) in the Jakobsruh Park (Lithuanian: Jokūbynės parkas) in Tilsit. The house, a replica of a typical house of a Western Samogitian peasant, was constructed for a crafts fair. Visitors to the house could witness traditional crafts (weaving, spinning) and taste traditional Lithuanian food. During the fair, which lasted from June to September 1905, the house was visited by 25,000 people. After the fair, the house remained in the park and was converted into an ethnographic museum. After World War I, due to political tensions over the Klaipėda Region (Memelland) between Germany and Lithuania, the house lost its Lithuanian character: it was referred to only as the Village House (Heimathaus) and its exhibits were transferred to the Tilsit Museum of Local History. The building was probably destroyed during World War II (the last known photo is from 1943).

The society had a library which grew to about 2000 volumes (1200 titles) by 1923. The library contained a few particularly rare books, including grammar Grammatica Litvanica (1654) by Daniel Klein and dictionary Vocabvlarivm Litthvanico-Germanicvm et Germanico-Litthvanicvm (1730) by Friederich Wilhelm Haack. The library also held an undated publication of Christian Gottlieb Mielcke's poem Pilkalnis, a fact which pushed the date of the first publication of the poem from 1931 to 1892 at the earliest. The publication was discovered and brought to researchers' attention only in 1980. After the disestablishment of the society, the library was transferred to the University of Königsberg. After World War II, the books ended up in the Adam Mickiewicz University in Poznań.

Activities of the society diminished during World War I. Post-war economic crisis in Germany and German–Lithuanian conflict over the Klaipėda Region caused the society to cease its activities in 1923. However, exact circumstances of its closure are not known. Some sources claim that it was liquidated in 1925 when its last chairman, Aleksandras Kuršaitis, resigned, but a year later Lietuvos keleivis published a notice that the society changed its name and was reorganized.

== Chairmen ==
- Karl Rudolf Jacobi (1879–81)
- Maximilian J. A. Voelkel (1881–82)
- Karl Theodor Waldemar Hoffheinz (1882–89)
- Konrad Theodor Preuss (1890–98)
- Aleksandras Kuršaitis (1899–1923?)

== Members ==
During its existence, the society had a total of 640 members: 91 in 1879, 206 in 1892, 228 in 1908, 217 in 1913–1920. Among them were famous German, Russian, and other linguists and philologists, including Jan Baudouin de Courtenay, Adalbert Bezzenberger, August Leskien, Aleksandăr Dorič, Filipp Fortunatow, Ferdinand de Saussure, Robert Gauthiot, Eduards Volters, Jan Aleksander Karłowicz, Max Müller, Jooseppi Julius Mikkola, Georg Heinrich Ferdinand Nesselmann, Aukusti Niemi, Ludwig Passarge, Vilhelm Thomsen. Lithuanian members included Antanas Baranauskas, Jonas Basanavičius, Kazimieras Būga; Prussian Lithuanian members included Vilius Gaigalaitis, Erdmonas Simonaitis, Vydūnas, Dovas Zaunius.

== Publications ==
The society published 11 books, the most prominent of them were:

- Two volumes of collection of Lithuanian songs by Christian Bartsch (Dainu Balsai. Melodieen litauischer Volkslieder gesammelt und mit Textübersetzung, Anmerkungen und Einleitung herausgegeben von C. Bartsch) in 1886 and 1889
- Collection of Prussian Lithuanian prayer songs by Karl Theodor Waldemar Hoffheinz (Giesmiu balsai: Litauische Kirchen-Gesänge) in 1894
- Collection of Lithuanian tales by Kristupas Jurkšaitis (Litauische Märchen und Erzählungen) in 1898
- Description of daily life and traditions of Lithuanians from Stallupönen (now Nesterov) by Carl Cappeller (Kaip seneji Letuvninkai gyveno. Aufzeichnungen aus dem Kreise Stalluponen) in 1904
- Three volumes of collection of Lithuanian tales about birds by Hugo Scheu and Aleksandras Kuršaitis (Pasakos apie paukščius: Žemaitische Tier-Fabeln) in 1913

== See also ==
- Estonian Learned Society
- Finnish Literary Society
- Latvian Literary Society
