= Marta Zauniūtė =

Lithuanian press activist

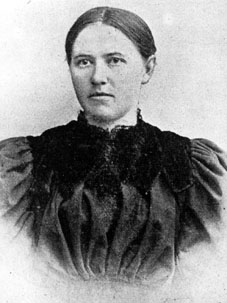
- Born: Martha Saunus; 22 March 1875; Rokaiten, (Note: Rokaiten (Lithuanian: Rokaičiai) was a village in Kreis Niederung (renamed Landkreis Elchniederung in 1939) in East Prussia. It was located north of Neukirch now known as Timiryazevo in Slavsky District of the Kaliningrad Oblast.) Province of Prussia, German Empire
- Died: 10 January 1945 (aged 69); Königsberg?
- Occupation: Activist
- Father: Dovas Zaunius
- Relatives: Dovas Zaunius (brother)

Marta or Morta Zauniūtė (German: Martha Saunus; 22 March 1875 – 10 January 1945?) was a Lithuanian press activist in Lithuania Minor. She is best remembered as the administrator of Lithuanian newspapers Varpas, Ūkininkas, and Naujienos from 1900 to 1905. Due to the Lithuanian press ban, these publications were printed in East Prussia and smuggled to Lithuania.

She was a life-long supporter of social democratic and later communist ideas. She helped publishing and smuggling of the political press as well as facilitating aid to Lithuanian political refugees.

== Biography ==
=== Early life ===
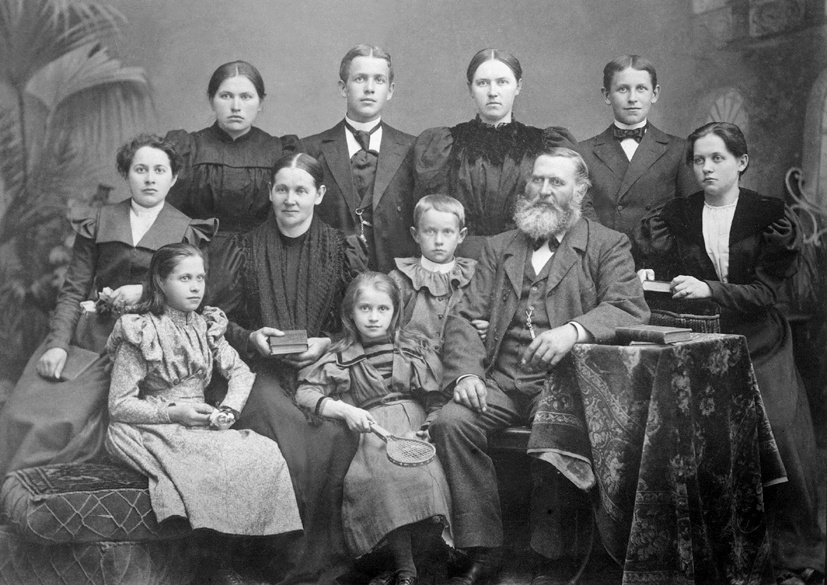
Zauniai family, 1900 First row: Marė, Augustė; second: Berta, Elzė (mother), Dovas (son), Dovas (father), Ema; third row: Ana, Endrius, Marta, Hermanis

Marta Zauniūtė was born on 22 March 1875 in Rokaiten in Prussia to the family of the Prussian Lithuanian activist Dovas Zaunius. The family had nine children, three sons and six daughters, including Dovas Zaunius (1892–1940) who became the Lithuanian Minister of Foreign Affairs (1929–1934) and Augustė Zauniūtė (1890–1950) who became a medical doctor.

Zauniūtė attended a girls' school in Tilsit and did not pursue higher education. She participated in the activities of Birutė Society (her father was its chairman). For example, in February 1899, she played the role of Dainienė in the play Pasiilgimas veldėtojo by Vydūnas that the society staged in Tilsit.

=== Press activist ===
She joined Lithuanian cultural life around 1900 when she helped organizing the Lithuanian exhibit at the Paris World's Fair. Her father was a member of the organizing committee, but it was Zauniūtė who collected, organized, and shipped the exhibits to Paris. In preparation for the fair, Zauniūtė together with Jonas Vanagaitis prepared a catalogue of Lithuanian-language publications in the Blackletter script. It was edited and published by Jonas Žilius-Jonila in the United States. It was the first catalog of Lithuanian-language publications in Lithuania Minor and contained entries for 154 books and 22 periodicals.

After the death of Vincas Kudirka, Zauniūtė was the administrator of Lithuanian newspapers Varpas, Ūkininkas, and Naujienos from 1900 to 1905. She also helped publishing Darbininkų balsas of the Social Democratic Party of Lithuania. Due to the Lithuanian press ban, these publications were printed in East Prussia and smuggled to Lithuania which was then part of the Russian Empire.

In February 1900, Zauniūtė became chairwoman of the newly established educational women's society Lietuvaičių šviesa (Light of Lithuanian Women) that planned of opening a Lithuanian library. However, it was short lived and ceased activities by 1901.

In 1902, Zauniūtė opened a Lithuanian bookstore in Tilsit. Some authors give the credit for the store to her fiancé Petras Mikolainis; Zauniūtė herself expressed irritation that he saw her more as a servant than an equal partner. The store served as an important supply center for Lithuanian book smugglers and Lithuanian emigrants. Because she helped organize the smuggling of social democratic and communist publications, the bookstore was frequently raided by the German police. It was not a profitable business and at one point her assets were auctioned off to cover her debts. The bookstore closed in 1905.

=== Facilitator ===
Zauniūtė also organized aid to Lithuanian activists who had to flee the Tsarist police. She was a member of the illegal society Martyrs' Fund (Lithuanian: Kankinių kasa) which collected donations to aid the persecuted activists of the Lithuanian Social Democratic Party and Lithuanian Democratic Party. She facilitated the communication between the activists in Lithuania and United States where most of the funds were collected. Imprisoned Vincas Kapsukas wrote notes and memoirs that he secretly sent to Zauniūtė for safekeeping (the memoirs were published in 1929).

Zauniūtė maintained a large network of contacts. She closely worked with Vydūnas and Martynas Jankus. She facilitated the correspondence of Jonas Šliūpas with other Lithuanian activists. She wrote letters to Povilas Višinskis, Jonas Jablonskis, Felicija Bortkevičienė, Kazys Grinius, Jurgis Šaulys, and others.

=== Later life ===
Around 1901, Zauniūtė became engaged to another Lithuanian activist Petras Mikolainis. He had escaped the German police to the United States, but returned to Tilsit in 1901 hoping to continue cultural work and to open a Lithuanian bookstore. However, he was discovered by the police and had to flee back to the United States in 1902. Mikolainis invited Zauniūtė to follow, offering her to continue her education. She delayed and refused until their relationship ended around 1909. Vincas Kapsukas and Juozas Gabrys also showed romantic interest, but Zauniūtė remained unmarried.

In early 1910s, Zauniūtė left Tilsit and moved back to her native Rokaiten. After World War I, she joined the Communist Party of Germany and assisted the Lithuanian Communist Party with publishing of its publications in Germany. Due to the increasing power of the Nazi Party, she moved to Klaipėda in 1930 to live with her sister Augustė who had a private medical practice in the city. In October 1935, Zauniūtė was awarded a monthly Lithuanian state pension of 100 Lithuanian litas. In 1945, during the Battle of Memel, she began retreating to Germany but her fate is unknown. It is believed that she died on 10 January 1945 in Königsberg.
