= Mortero =

Mortero may refer to:

- Spanish for mortar, or
  - Mortar (weapon)
  - Mortar (masonry)
  - Mortar and pestle
- Francisco Jerónimo de Jesús Lagos Cházaro Mortero, President of Mexico in 1915
- Nickname for Jorge Aravena (footballer) (born 1958), Chilean former footballer

== See also ==
- Mortar (disambiguation)
