= Sandora Society =

Lithuanian christian charitable society

Sandora Society was a charitable, cultural, and educational society active in Lithuania Minor (mainly the Klaipėda Region) from 1904 to 1940. Its long-term chairman and leader was Lutheran priest Vilius Gaigalaitis. Based in Klaipėda (Memel), it supported Prussian Lithuanian activities as a counterweight to Germanization efforts. The society supported religious education for the youth, provided charitable aid to the elderly (including opening a modern care home in 1935 which continues to this day), organized church choirs, published monthly Pagalba as well as religious and educational books. It had a rich library which had about 7,000 books by 1937. Sandora and its institutions were closed after the German takeover of Klaipėda Region in 1939. The society was reestablished by Lutheran priests in 1989–1995.

== History ==
Sandora membership
Year	Members
1905	78
1907	130
1908	209
1910	374
1911	412
1913	435
1914	533
1919	755
1933	951
1937	668

The society was initiated by Kristupas Lokys, a Lutheran missionary in India. It was established in February 1904 to promote Christian values and teetotalism. In August 1905, priest and activist Vilius Gaigalaitis was elected chairman. He remained the driving force of the society until 1939. Gaigalaitis was so vital and central to Sandora that researcher Domas Kaunas characterized the society as a personal endeavor of Gaigalaitis.

The society diminished during World War I, but did not cease its activities. It grew after the Klaipėda Region became an autonomous region of Lithuania. In 1934, the society had assets of 68,000 Lithuanian litas and had revenue of 177,866 litas. Its main revenue was donations from Lithuanian-speaking villagers. After 1923, it also received support from the Lithuanian government. Despite its religious character, Sandora was not supported by the Evangelical Lutheran Church in Lithuania.

After the region was taken over by Nazi Germany in March 1939, society's activities were restricted and it was closed in 1940.

== Activities ==
=== Education and charity ===
Sandora supported religious education for the youth. It established Sunday schools and published books for adolescents. It encouraged students to pursue higher education and provided financial aid. A few times, the society organized its own courses (for example, courses for homemakers in 1908 and for nurses in 1932). Sandora supported the establishment of the first Lithuanian gymnasium in Memel (now Klaipėda Vytautas Magnus Gymnasium) in 1922 and the Faculty of the Evangelical Theology at Vytautas Magnus University in 1925.

In 1908, the society opened its house in Klaipėda which hosted a bookstore, soup kitchen, and space for meetings and events. It was located next to the Church of St. Jacob. In 1918, the house also hosted a dormitory for students. In 1933, Gaigalaitis built a new personal residence. The first floor had two large halls used by Sandora for various events. He lived on the second floor.

During World War I, Sandora raised funds in Germany and United States for the Prussians deported to Siberia.

Sandora established and maintained homes for the elderly and the disabled in Plikiai (1926) and Tauragė Manor (1928). In 1935, the two homes for the elderly were consolidated and moved to the newly constructed modern premises in Laugaliai (now part of Gargždai) that could accommodate about a hundred residents. The home continues to operate to this day is now named after Vilius Gagalaitis.

=== Related societies ===
Sandora organized local chapters in each parish. It organized various local meetings, festivals, lectures and had church choirs. Sandora's sections for women and youth became separate organizations in 1924 and 1928, respectively.

The women's organization Moterų pagalba (Women's Help) established two kindergartens and Sunday schools. The organization provided aid to struggling families by purchasing women's crafts (for example, knitted gloves or woven tablecloth) and selling them to the public. Starting in June 1935, they organized an annual flower festival and used the proceeds for charitable purposes. The women also organized other events like the commemoration of the Mother's Day.

The youth organization Jaunųjų Sandora primarily concerned with religious education and organizing religious celebrations. In 1937, the youth organization had 14 chapters with 380 members, 10 church choirs, five wind and four string ensembles. It also published a calendar and had a radio program.

=== Publications and library ===
Sandora published its monthly Lithuanian newspaper Pagalba (1904–1938) edited by Gaigalaitis. It was distributed to society's members for free. Pagalba published mainly religious and educational texts. Sandora also published 23 books, including five textbooks for primary schools. Other books were mainly on religious topics.

In 1910, Sandora started selling books and other publications. Initially, it sold books at the Klaipėda city market, but quickly established more permanent bookstores in Priekulė (1913) and Klaipėda (1914) but they were closed during World War I. Sandora reestablished its bookstore in 1928. In addition to books, it sold women's handcrafts and office supplies. Additional bookstores were opened in Pagėgiai (1934) and Šilutė (1938).

The society had a rich library as its chairman Gaigalaitis merged his personal book collection with the society's library. Initially, the library attempted to collect all Lithuanian publications. Therefore, it included some old and rare Lithuanian publications, such as Postil of Jonas Bretkūnas (1591), hymnal by Daniel Klein (1704), dictionary by Philipp Ruhig (1747). The library focused on Lithuanian and Lutheran publications. By 1937, it had 6,937 books. According to library's handwritten catalog, it had about 3,850 books and 185 periodicals in Lithuanian, 3,020 books and 66 periodicals in German, and a handful of publications in English and French. The library was dispersed during World War II. Some 1,600 books were transferred to the Martynas Mažvydas National Library of Lithuania in 1997, but the fate of the oldest and rarest books is unknown.

In addition to books, the society also collected ethnographic items and Lithuanian folk art. It showcased some of these items at folk art exhibitions in Berlin, Königsberg, Gumbinnen, Klaipėda.

== Reestablishment ==
As Lithuania regained independence in 1990, the society was reestablished by Lutheran priests in Klaipėda, Šilutė, Priekulė, Pagėgiai in 1989–1995. In 1996, it opened its premises in Klaipėda (Turgaus g. 35) that hosted a charitable pharmacy, soup kitchen, and various events and meetings. The society aimed to provide aid to the elderly, disabled, single mothers, recently released from prisons, and others. It received support from various German organizations. In 2012, the Šilutė chapter provided aid to 23 children and about 115 elderly. The Klaipėda chapter ceased operations in 2024 due to financial difficulties.
