= Birutė Society =

Prussian Lithuanian cultural society

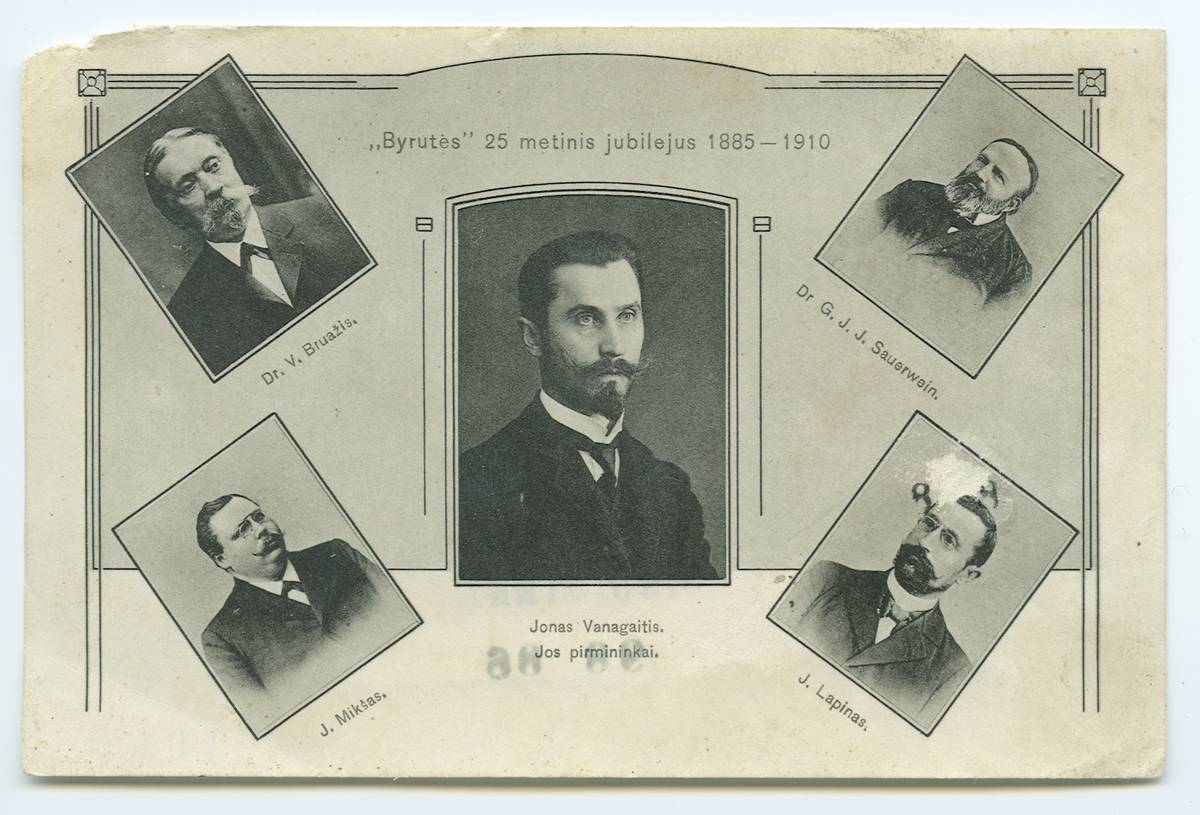
Postcard published in 1910 (the 25th anniversary of the society) features five of its chairmen

The Birutė Society was the first cultural non-religious society of Prussian Lithuanians. Established in 1885 in Tilsit, East Prussia (present-day Sovetsk), the society was intermittently active until the outbreak of World War I. The society sought to preserve Lithuanian language and culture and protect them from Germanization. While it discussed linguistic and cultural subjects, the society never raised issues of social inequality or protested against the political regime of Kaiser Wilhelm II. The society prompted the division of Prussian Lithuanians into two main groups: religious conservative versus secular liberals. Birutė is best remembered for organizing festivals and celebrations that featured Lithuanian-language performances of various folk and patriotic songs as well as amateur theater performances, including the first Lithuanian-language theater performance in 1895.

== History ==
=== Establishment and early activities ===
The Lithuanian Literary Society was established in Tilsit in 1879, but it took more academic interest in Lithuanian language and culture. The society considered that the Lithuanian culture was dying due to Germanization and sought to record and study it but took no steps in keeping the language and culture alive. Thus Lithuanian activists began preparations for their own society. The issue was first raised by Georg Sauerwein in Lietuwißka Ceitunga in 1882. The idea was supported and further crystallized by Jonas Basanavičius, Jonas Šliūpas, and others. They decided to establish a society that would study Lithuanian culture and heritage and that would actively promote it among the Lithuanians both in Lithuania Minor and Lithuania Major. They went as far as collecting membership applications and dues and scheduling the organizational meeting for 11 January 1894, but due to various difficulties, including financial hardship faced by Aušra newspaper, such society was not established. Basanavičius established the Lithuanian Scientific Society only in 1907.

Instead, on 15 February 1885, four Prussian Lithuanians (Martynas Jankus, Jurgis Mikšas, Kristupas Voska, Ernestas Vejeris) established purely cultural society Birutė. At the time, they were its only members. The society was named after Grand Duchess Birutė (died in 1382) possibly as a result of a poem published in Aušra. The name was later criticized for being too feminine and for not reflecting the identity of Prussian Lithuanians. The new society was attacked and criticized by the Germans for competing with the Lithuanian Literary Society and by religious Prussian Lithuanians for being too secular.

The society held monthly meeting to discuss new books, share folklore, deliver presentations, debate on ways to stop Germanization. The meetings took place not only in Tilsit, but also in Memel (Klaipėda), Coadjuthen (Katyčiai), Kaukehmen (Jasnoje), Ragnit (Neman), Lasdehnen (Krasnoznamensk), Schmalleningken (Smalininkai). The number of attendees grew from a dozen to 300. However, the quality of presentations and discussions was limited by lack of education among Birutė's members, most of whom only had primary education. In one of the early meetings, Vilius Bruožis, future chairman of the society, spoke for three hours trying to prove that the Lithuanian language was spoken in the Garden of Eden. The society considered and took tentative steps to establish Lithuanian-language schools, publish books (including a history of Lithuania that would incorporate the history of Lithuania Minor), its own newspaper, or calendars, but those plans were not realized. The society considered but rejected the idea of taking over the publication of bankrupt Aušra. Instead, it financially supported (15 marks per month) the short-lived newspaper Garsas published by Jankus. In 1888, the society officially dropped book publication from its goals and reduced the number of meetings to once a quarter. In total, between 1885 and 1888, the society held about 30 meetings.

=== Revival in 1895–1899 ===
The moribund society was revived in February 1895 for the celebration of its 10th anniversary. It organized a festival, attended by some 800 people, which included amateur theater performance of a play by Aleksandras Fromas-Gužutis about the Siege of Kaunas in 1362. It was the first Lithuanian-language theater performance preceding the first performance in Lithuania Major by five years. The play was followed by living scenes which depicted a battle with the Teutonic Order and post-battle negotiations. Other performances included a concert by an orchestra of Prussian dragoons and seven singers from Tauragė (Lithuania Major). Among the songs performed was Lietuvininkai we are born by Georg Sauerwein to a melody of Vincas Nacevičius. Other songs included polka and mazurka by Vincas Kudirka, compositions by teacher Eduard Gisevius, works by German and Italian composers.

The festival was a success and it was decided to organize such events twice a year, in winter and in summer during the Saint Jonas' Festival. The same year, Birutė established its men's choir which first performed in February 1896. The society convinced Vydūnas to direct it, but it soon disbanded. The last performance was in June 1897. Another Lithuanian choir was established at the Lithuanian Church in Tilsit and was also directed by Vydūnas. This Lithuanian Choir of Tilsit was more successful and, at different times, was either a collaborator with or the main competitor of Birutė. Songs sung at Birutė's event were patriotic and often originated from Lithuania Major attracting criticism for being too radical. The festivals were organized not only in Tilsit, but also on Rambynas in 1896 and 1900 and in Memel (Klaipėda) in 1897. In 1899, the celebrations featured first plays by Vydūnas staged by his choir members. Due to inappropriate behavior by Birutė members, the Lithuanian Choir refused further collaborations and the society's activities diminished.

Rambynas, a sacred hill in the Lithuanian mythology, was a private property and therefore access to it was limited. Birutė bought a plot of land (11 morgens) on the eastern part of the hill to provide public access, but it lacked funds to pay the purchase price and the plot was eventually transferred to Wilhelm Gaigalat. In 1899, an idea was raised to build a monument (a Lithuanian girl playing kanklės) on Rambynas dedicated to Kristijonas Donelaitis, Prussian Lithuanian poet and the author of the first Lithuanian-language poem. It seems that the idea originated from Birutė, though it was not realized.

=== Revival by Vanagaitis ===
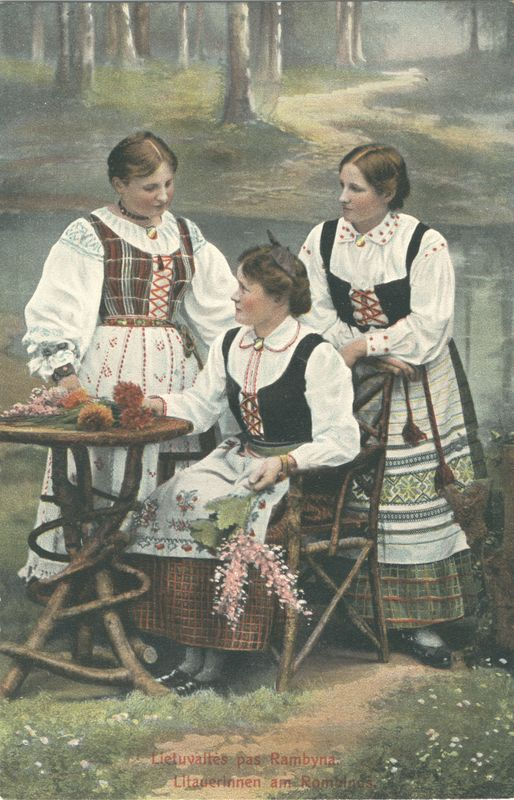
"Lithuanian Women at Rambynas", a postcard published by the society

After a failed event in February 1901, the society became barely active and a liquidation meeting was called for December 1903. However, the meeting instead elected new chairman Jonas Vanagaitis who revived the organization. However, until 1908 the society was not very active as Vanagaitis and other members were more involved and focused on activities of the Lithuanian Union in Prussia (Lietuvininkų susivienijimas Prūsuose). In 1905, Birutė assisted the Lithuanian Literary Society with building the Lithuanian House in the Jakobsruh Park in Tilsit. In 1905, the society celebrated its 20th anniversary. The celebration included two plays written and staged by Vydūnas and his Lithuanian Choir. The plays were specifically written for the occasion and poked fun at Birutė's weaknesses and strengths.

In 1908–1909, the society resumed the tradition of organizing concerts and theater performances at various rural locations of Lithuania Minor. For example, it organized an Easter concert in Katyčiai in 1909. Initially it enlisted the help of a choir from Tauragė, but soon reestablished its own choir (1909–1912), directed by Albert Johann Niemann. However, the events were not as popular or well executed as those of the Lithuanian Choir of Tilsit. Vilniaus žinios in particular harshly criticized the performance of Ponas ir mužikai in 1908.

In 1910, the society commemorated the 500th anniversary of the Battle of Grunwald. The celebration was inspired not only by the 25th anniversary of the society, but also by the German commemoration of the Battle of the Teutoburg Forest a year earlier. Not all Prussian Lithuanians supported the event. In articles published in Lietuwißka Ceitunga and Tilžės Keleiwis, opponents argued for maintaining good relations with all neighbors and not following the example of Poles who irresponsibly provoked conflicts. They also directed people's attention to the 100th death anniversary of the beloved Louise, Queen of Prussia.

In June 1910, Prussian Lithuanian youth gathered on Rambynas. It started a boom of youth organizations in various town; in a few years more than 15 local organizations were established. In 1912, they united under the umbrella organization Santara. These organizations took the initiative and overshadowed Birutė, which ceased its activities altogether in 1914 at the outbreak of World War I.

== Legacy ==
In September 1911, Vanagaitis started publishing journal Birutė which began using the term Lithuania Minor more often, competing with previous preferred term Prussian Lithuania. This reflected a shift in the understanding of the term Lithuania. The society early on adopted the green–white–red flag that was historically used in the region (its origins are unknown); the flag eventually became the flag of Lithuania Minor. While the society promoted events and symbols from the history of the Grand Duchy of Lithuania (such as the struggles against the Teutonic Order during the Lithuanian Crusade or the image of Grand Duke Vytautas as the great leader), it remained politically loyal to the German Empire. Birutė provided the first alternative to the historical memory promoted by the German Empire or the Church. Prussian Lithuanians knew more about the House of Hohenzollern and Margraviate of Brandenburg than about the Grand Duchy of Lithuania. It was an early attempt at finding own distinctive history and identity, which was continued by other organizations. While Birutė was plagued by lack of leadership and internal disagreements, its amateur concerts and theater performances sought to prove that the Lithuanian language was viable and equal to other languages.

== Library ==
In March 1908, Birutė transferred its library and archaeological collection to the Lithuanian Scientific Society in Vilnius. At that time, the library had about 750 books, most of which were acquired via donations. The donors included linguists Jan Baudouin de Courtenay and Adalbert Bezzenberger, publishers of Aušra and Varpas, and others. About 61% of the books were in the Lithuanian language with German books accounting for 13%. The society did not have separate premises and stored the books at home of its librarians, who included Dovas Zaunius and Jonas Smalakys. While the majority of the books were from the 19th and 20th centuries (92% and 5%, respectively), the collection included several rare books, including Postil of Jonas Bretkūnas (1591). After 1908, the society reestablished the library collecting fiction and non-fiction books geared towards the general public.

== Chairmen ==
The chairmen were:

1. Jurgis Mikšas (February–June 1885)
2. Vilius Bruožis (June 1885 – February 1887)
3. Georg Sauerwein (March–August 1887)
4. Dovas Zaunius (August 1887 – December 1889, 1892–1893, 1900, March 1902 – December 1903)
5. Martynas Jankus (December 1889 – summer 1892)
6. Jurgis Lapinas (June 1893 – 1900)
7. Kristupas Voska (1900)
8. Jonas Vanagaitis (December 1903 – 1914)

== Theater performances ==
The society staged the following amateur plays:

- 1895 and 1901: Išgriovimas Kauno pilies 1362 m. about the Siege of Kaunas (1362) by Aleksandras Fromas-Gužutis
- 1896: Kova ties Žalgiriu about the Battle of Grunwald in 1410 by Jonas Grinius
- 1897 and 1908: Ponas ir mužikai about serfdom by Aleksandras Fromas-Gužutis
- 1898: Kęstutis about Grand Duke Kęstutis by Adam Asnyk
- 1899: Pasiilgimas veldėtojo by Vydūnas
- 1900: Amerika pirtyje, a comedy about a con artist, by brothers Antanas and Juozas Vilkutaitis
- 1908: Užburtas kunigaikštis, a comedy translated from German by Antanas Macijauskas
- 1909: Raudvylas and Atlygino by Jonas Vanagaitis
- 1910: Testamentas and Žentas by Jonas Vanagaitis, Birutė by Gabrielius Žemkalnis-Landsbergis

== Publications ==
The society published:

- Collections of songs Birutės dainos (1886, 1899, 1906, 1919, 1921), Birutininkų dainos (1908), Birutės garsai (1910, 1914), Birutės dainų vainikėlis (1910)
- Collection of speeches by Georg Sauerwein (1887, 1897)
- Collection of sheet music by Albert Niemann Lietuvių tėvynės dainos (1911)
