= Jonas Smalakys =

Prussian Lithuanian landowner and soldier

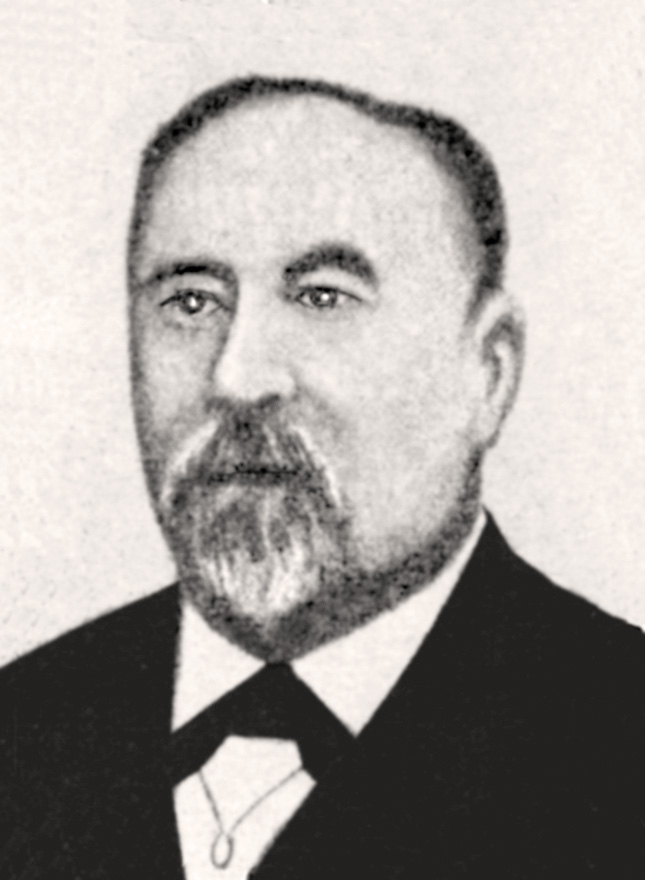
- Jonas Smalakys
- Born: 7 June 1835; Gross Trumpeiten, (Note: The village was known as Groß Trumpeiten in German and Didieji Trumpaičiai in Lithuanian. It was renamed to Trumpenau in 1938 (Russian: Трумпайтен) and to Shanino (Russian: Шанино) in 1946. It was located just south of Kaukehmen (present-day Jasnoje).) Kingdom of Prussia
- Died: 8 May 1901 (aged 65); Tilsit, German Empire
- Occupations: Politician, soldier, manor owner

Jonas Smalakys (7 June 1835 – 8 May 1901) was a Prussian Lithuanian landowner, soldier, and the first Prussian Lithuanian to be elected to the Reichstag.

== Early life ==
Smalakys was born into a wealthy landowning family in Prussia (Lithuania Minor), and in the 1850s used his inheritance to fund his travels across Europe, through the Balkans, and into Asia and Egypt. In 1859, he fought in the Second Italian War of Independence under Giuseppe Garibaldi. In 1862, he returned to Prussia and owned a manor in Gross Aglawischken. (Note: The village, located near Smalakys' birthplace, was known as Didieji Algaviškiai in Lithuanian.) He sold the manor in 1894 and moved to Tilsit where he worked in trade.

Before selling his manor, Smalakys organized a gathering of Lithuanian and Prussian Lithuanian activists during the Saint Jonas' Festival in 1894. It included Vincas Kudirka and book smugglers. In 1895, he joined the board of the cultural Birutė Society and was its librarian. In 1898, he was one of the founders and board members of the Writing and Reading Society.

== Political career ==
In 1890, together with Martynas Jankus and Dovas Zaunius, Smalakys established the Lithuanian Conservative Election Society (Lithuanian: Lietuviška konservatyvų skyrimo draugystė), which was the first of several such societies. Sometimes described as the first Lithuanian political party, its goal was to elect Prussian Lithuanians to the Reichstag and the Landtag of Prussia and to defend the use of the Lithuanian language, particularly when it came to the religious education in schools. Smalakys was a candidate to the Landtag in 1893 and 1898, but was not elected.

=== 1898 elections ===
In the Reichstag election of June 1898, Smalakys was elected in the Memel–Heydekrug (Klaipėda–Šilutė) district. In the first round, he received only 23% of the vote, but an alliance with the liberals allowed him to gather 55% in the run-off and defeat his conservative opponent Generaloberst Graf Alfred von Waldersee. Two other Prussian Lithuanians, Dovas Zaunius and Mikelis Juška, as well as pro-Lithuanian linguist Georg Sauerwein unsuccessfully ran in the election. Jonas Basanavičius visited them from the Principality of Bulgaria and helped them with the campaign.

Results of the 1898 Reichstag election
Candidate	Votes received	
Candidate	First round	Second round
Alfred von Waldersee (German Conservative Party)	5,557	6,456
Jonas Smalakys	3,504	7,818
Heinrich Ancker (Free-minded People's Party)	3,226	
Otto Braun (Social Democratic Party)	3,015	
Total	15,302	14,274

In the Reichstag, Smalakys listed himself as a Lithuanian and defended the rights of Prussian Lithuanians. However, politically, he was conservative and supported the German Empire. In a March 1899 speech to the Reichstag, he offered "every coin and the last drop of blood" for the benefit of the German Imperial Army. After his death in May 1901, a by-election was held in July and another Prussian Lithuanian Friedrich Martin Mattschull, a member of the German Conservative Party, was elected in his place.
