= Vincė Jonuškaitė =

Lithuanian opera singer

Vincė Jonuškaitė-Zaunienė
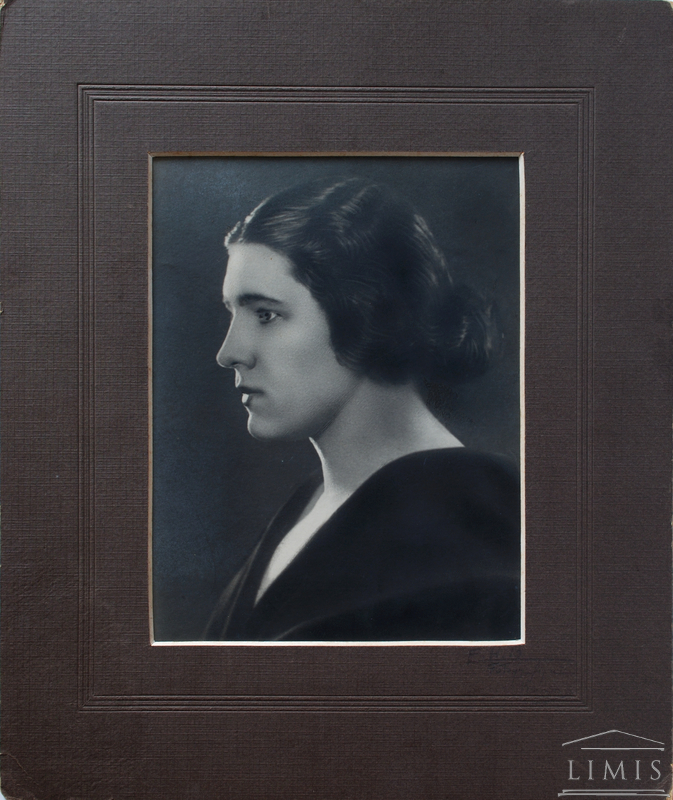
- Born: 22 January 1901; Subačius, Kupiškis district, Panevėžys County, Lithuania.
- Died: 18 May 1997 (aged 96); Santa Barbara, California, USA
- Occupation: Opera singer
- Spouse(s): 1. Dovas Zaunius (deceased); 2. Stasys Leskaitis-Ivošiškis
- Awards: Order of the Lithuanian Grand Duke Gediminas,

Vincė Jonuškaitė (22 January 1901 – 18 May 1997) was a leading Lithuanian mezzo-soprano opera singer who performed around the world. She was also an ethnographer who studied Lithuanian clothing and songs. She was first married to Dovas Zaunius who served as Lithuanian Foreign Minister from 1929 to 1934.

== Early life ==
Vincė Jonuškaitė-Zaunienė was born on 22 January 1901 in Subačius in Kupiškis district, Panevėžys County, in northwestern Lithuania. She graduated from primary school there, and then moved on to study at the Panevėžys Gymnasium (High School). In 1915, in the early days of World War I she moved to Voronezh in southwest Russia, where she entered a music school to study singing with the Latvian soloist Elza Zubitė. Returning to Lithuania in 1918 she completed a teacher training course, taught in Surdegis, and also worked at the Ministry of Agriculture in Lithuania's second city of Kaunas, where she also took piano lessons. In 1919, she suffered from typhoid. At the invitation of friends, she began to take part in local concert performances. Between 1920 and 1923 Jonuškaitė studied singing at the Berlin State School of Music, learning German during her stay. She also studied privately in Rome in 1923–1925 and in Milan in 1926 and 1928, becoming fluent in Italian.

== Opera career ==
In 1925 Jonuškaitė made her professional debut in Palanga in Lithuania. In November of the same year, she made her debut as a soloist at the Kaunas State Drama Theatre, as Polina in The Queen of Spades by Tchaikovsky. She would stay at the theatre until 1944, during which time she played 47 different roles. Her performance of Carmen in Bizet's Carmen, which she performed 200 times, is considered to be one of the most significant performances in the history of Lithuanian theatre. Outside of Lithuania, Jonuškaitė performed in operas at the Teatro Colón in Buenos Aires, the National Theatre in Prague, at the Latvian National Opera in Riga, at the Opéra-Comique in Paris and in many other theatres. She also performed recitals in Berlin, Warsaw, Vienna, Moscow, London and Copenhagen.

== Ethnography ==
Jonuškaitė made a collection of Lithuanian women's clothes from the 19th century from different ethnographic regions of the country. These were donated by her daughter to the Vytautas the Great War Museum in Kaunas. Most of the collection is of aprons. For a long time, the most important part of Lithuanian traditional clothing was the apron and it was unacceptable for a woman to appear in public without wearing one. Practical and decorative, the quality of the apron also established a woman's social position. Jonuškaitė was also responsible for collecting and promoting Lithuanian folk songs. She organized a series of recitals of such songs, many of which she had learned from her mother. Many of these performances were given outside Lithuania, including in Rome, Stockholm, Paris, Chicago and Toronto.

== Emigration ==
In 1944, Jonuškaitė left Lithuania at the time of the Soviet re-occupation of the Baltic states and made her way through Germany to the US, where she lived from 1948 until her death in 1997, performing, giving lectures on Lithuanian folk songs and taking an active part in the life of the Lithuanian diaspora.

== Personal life ==
Jonuškaitė married the diplomat, Dovas Zaunius, who would become Minister of Foreign Affairs of Lithuania in 1929–1934. After his death, she married the writer Stasys Leskaitis.

== Awards and honours ==
Jonuškaitė was awarded the Gold Medal of La Renaissance Française, a French cultural society, in 1934. In 1935 she was awarded the Order of the Lithuanian Grand Duke Gediminas, 3rd Class.

== Death ==
Jonuškaitė died in Santa Barbara, California on 18 May 1997. Her body was returned to Lithuania and buried in Kaunas on 15 August 1997. The Subačius High School is named after her. Since 2000, an annual singing competition, which bears her name, has been held at the Lithuanian Academy of Music and Theatre.
