= Mortar =

Mortar may refer to:

- Mortar (weapon), an indirect-fire infantry weapon
- Mortar (masonry), a material used to fill the gaps between blocks and bind them together
- Mortar and pestle, a tool pair used to crush or grind
- Mortar, Bihar, a village in India
- The Manby mortar, an invention for rescuing shipwreck survivors

== See also ==
- Mortar methods, discretization methods for partial differential equations
- Mortarboard, a type of headwear worn as part of academic dress
- Mortar Board, a national honor society for college seniors
