= Dovas Zaunius (senior) =

Prussian Lithuanian cultural and political activist

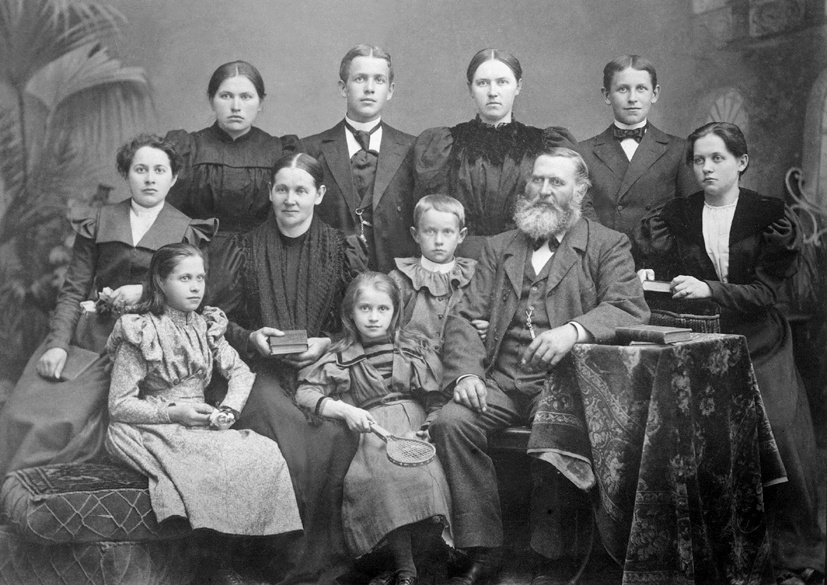
- Zauniai family, 1900; First row: Marė, Augustė; second: Berta, Elzė (mother), Dovas (son), Dovas (father), Ema; third row: Ana, Endrius, Marta, Hermanis
- Born: 26 January 1845; Rokaiten, (Note: The village was known as Rokaiten in German and Rokaičiai in Lithuanian. It was located about 7 kilometres (4.3 mi) west of Slavsk.) Province of Prussia, Kingdom of Prussia
- Died: 25 June 1921 (aged 76); Rokaiten, Weimar Republic
- Occupation: Farmer
- Known for: Political and cultural activism
- Political party: Lithuanian Conservative Election Societies
- Board member of: Birutė Society
- Children: Dovas Zaunius; Marta Zauniūtė and seven more

Dovas Zaunius (German: David Saunus; 1845–1921) was a Prussian Lithuanian cultural and political activist. He supported Lithuanian book smugglers and sheltered Lithuanian activist fleeing the Tsarist police. He was chairman of Birutė Society which organized Lithuanian cultural events and managed the budget of the Lithuanian newspaper Varpas from 1900 to 1905. In 1890, Zaunius co-founded the first of the Lithuanian Conservative Election Societies that sought to elect Prussian Lithuanians to the German Reichstag and Prussian Landtag. Zaunius unsuccessfully ran in the Reichstag elections three times.

== Biography ==
=== Book smuggling ===
Zaunius received only primary education and earned a living off his 37 hectares (91 acres) farm in Rokaiten. He supported publication of Lithuanian books and their smuggling across the Prussian–Russian border. Lithuanian-language books printed in the Latin alphabet were banned in Lithuania which was then part of the Russian Empire (see the Lithuanian press ban).

His farm welcomed various Lithuanian activists who were persecuted by the Tsarist authorities for violations of the ban or other political activities, including Vincas Kapsukas, Juozas Bagdonas, and Petras Mikolainis. Linguist Georg Sauerwein lived on the farm for a year and composed the poem Lietuvininkai we are born.

=== Cultural activities ===
Between 1887 and 1903, Zaunius was elected as chairman of the Birutė Society several times. However, his tenure marked periods of low activity and the society came close to being liquidated in 1903. In 1900, Zaunius and his daughter Morta Zauniūtė were entrusted with managing the budget for the Lithuanian exposition at the world's fair in Paris.

He managed the budget of the Lithuanian newspaper Varpas from 1900 to 1905. Zaunius also organized a library at his farm. It sought to collect all Lithuanian publications. Some of this collection was donated to the Lithuanian Scientific Society in Vilnius, the rest was lost during World War II.

=== Political activities ===
In 1890, together with Martynas Jankus, Jonas Smalakys, and others, Zaunius established the first of the Lithuanian Conservative Election Societies. The goal of such societies was to elect Prussian Lithuanians to the German Reichstag and Prussian Landtag. When the society broke up based on the electoral districts, Zaunius chaired the Tilsit–Elchniederung section. He unsuccessfully ran in the Reichstag elections three times. In 1892 and 1900, he was involved with the collection of signatures for petitions to the Prussian Ministers of Education asking to leave the Lithuanian language in primary schools.

== Family ==
Dovas Zaunius and Elzė Zaunienė had nine children (three sons (Andrius, Dovas (junior), Hermanis) and six daughters (Anna, Marė, Marta, Berta, Ema, Augustė), all of which received good education:

- Youngest son Dovas Zaunius (1892–1940) was a diplomat and Lithuanian Minister of Foreign Affairs (1929–1934)
- Daughter Augustė Zauniūtė (1890–1950) was one of the first women medical doctors and had a practice in Memel (Klaipėda)
- Daughter Marta Zauniūtė (1875–1945) dedicated her life to the Lithuanian press, and helped Lithuanian book smugglers
