= Mortar, Bihar =

Mortar Jagatnathpur
- Village
- Location within Bihar Location within India
- Coordinates: 25.721°N 86.136°E
- Country: India
- State: Bihar
- District: Begusarai
- CD block: Garhpura

Area
  - Total: 271 ha (670 acres)
- Elevation: 41 m (135 ft)

Population (2011)
  - Total: 1,817

Languages
  - Official: Maithili, Hindi
- Time zone: UTC+5:30 (IST)
- Telephone code: 06243
- ISO 3166 code: IN-BR
- Website: begusarai.bih.nic.in

Mortar is a village in the Garhpura block of Begusarai district in the Indian state of Bihar about 32.5 km (20.2 miles) north of district capital, Begusarai. The 2011 census gives its population as 1,817. It comes under Malipur Panchayat and under post office Malipur.

== Facilities ==
As of 2009, the water supply is from wells and hand pumps; there is no tap water. Domestic electricity is available. Primary, middle and secondary schooling is provided within the village. The nearest police station is at Garhpura.

== Mortar Durga Puja Samiti ==
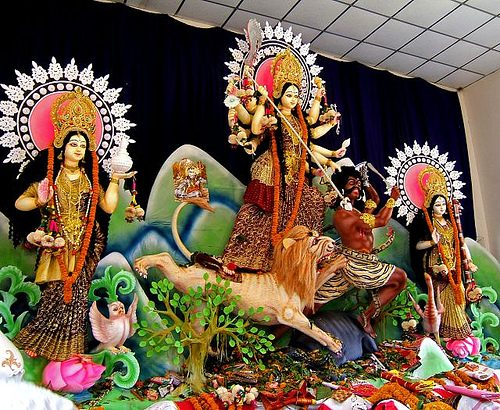
Jai Maa Durga

The annual Durga Puja festival is organised by the Mortar Durga Puja Samiti. A mela takes place in the school ground, when an idol of the goddess Durga is made and people gather together to celebrate. Sweets are bought, new clothes are worn, people offer their prayers, and different types of functions are organised, like Kushti. At night, you can enjoy Jagran along with a play by the Mortar Youth Front.

== See also ==
- Begusarai
