= Lithuanian Conservative Election Societies =

The Lithuanian Conservative Election Societies (Lithuanian: Lietuviškos konservatyvų skyrimo draugystės) were several loosely connected political societies of Prussian Lithuanians active from 1890 to the German Revolution of 1918–19. They sought to elect Prussian Lithuanians to the German Reichstag and Prussian Landtag and to defend the use of the Lithuanian language. The societies managed to get two representatives to the Reichstag (Jonas Smalakys in 1898–1901 and, after Smalakys' death, Friedrich Martin Mattschull in 1901–1903) and two to the Landtag (Wilhelm Gaigalat in 1903–1918 and Wilhelm Steputat in 1913–1918). It is sometimes described as the first Lithuanian political party (the Social Democratic Party of Lithuania was established in 1895).

== History ==
The first society, the Committee of the Lithuanian Conservative Society (Lithuanian: Lietuviškos konservatyvų draugystės komitetas), was established in 1890 in Tilsit (now Sovetsk) by Martynas Jankus, Jonas Smalakys, Dovas Zaunius, and others. In 1892, the committee broke up to several societies based on the electoral districts: Tilsit–Elchniederung (active in 1892–1918), Memel (Klaipėda) (1895–1918), Heydekrug (Šilutė) (1895–1918), and Ragnit–Pillkallen (1895–1907).

== Activities ==
The societies were generally conservative in their political leanings, i.e. they were loyal to the Lutheran Church, German Empire and the Kaiser Wilhelm II and generally agreed with the German Conservative Party, though they dropped the word "conservative" from their names in 1903. Culturally, however, they opposed Germanisation and, in particular, the removal of the Lithuanian language from schools. The societies helped collecting signatures for various petitions on the issue to Kaiser and other officials. The largest such petitions were:

- petition with 13 demands and 19,537 signatures sent out to Robert of Zedlitz-Trützschler, Minister of Education, on 5 March 1892;
- petition with about 27,800 signatures was delivered to Berlin on 21 April 1896 (the delegation failed to deliver it to Kaiser directly);
- petition with about 13,000 signatures was delivered to Conrad von Studt, Minister of Education, in 1900.

The societies published various brochures, proclamations, etc. In 1896–1899, they published newspaper Lietuwiszkas Laiszkas (Lithuanian Letter) which was renamed to Auszra (Dawn) from the 24th issue. Initially, it was a weekly but from the 38th issue it was published every two weeks. Its editors were Enzys Jagomastas, Kristupas Voska, Jurgis Arnašius, and others. The publication, after 258 issues, was closed by German censors in October 1899. In 1911–1914, the societies published Organas lietuviškos skyrimo draugystės (Organ of the Lithuanian Election Society), a newspaper edited by Ansas Baltris, Jurgis Tramišius, Fricas Ambrassat.
