= Dovas Zaunius =

Lithuanian politician and diplomat

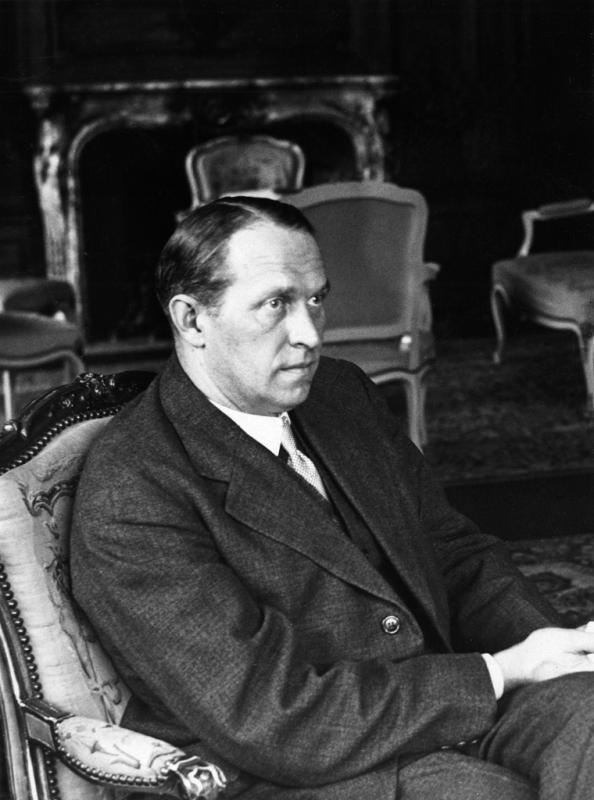

Foreign Minister of Lithuania
- In office 8 November 1929 – 12 June 1934
- Preceded by: Augustinas Voldemaras
- Succeeded by: Stasys Lozoraitis

Personal details
- Born: 19 June 1892 An Rokaiten, (Note: The village was known as An Rokaiten in German and Rokaičiai in Lithuanian. It was renamed to Kleinrokitten or Klein Rokitten in 1938 and to Kamskoye (Russian: Камское) in 1946. It is located about 7 kilometres (4.3 mi) west of Slavsk, Kaliningrad Oblast, Russia.) East Prussia, German Empire
- Died: February 22, 1940 (aged 47) Kaunas, Lithuania
- Resting place: Kaunas Evangelical Cemetery (now Ramybės Park)
- Spouse: Vincė Jonuškaitė
- Parent: Dovas Zaunius (senior) (father)
- Education: Ludwig-Maximilians-Universität München; University of Königsberg
- Occupation: lawyer diplomat

Dovas Zaunius (19 June 1892 – 22 February 1940) was a Lithuanian lawyer, politician and diplomat who served as Ambassador to Switzerland from 1925 to 1927 and Lithuanian Foreign Minister from 1929 to 1934.

== Biography ==
Zaunius was born in East Prussia as the youngest son of Dovas Zaunius (senior) who was a political and public figure in Lithuania Minor. In 1911, he graduated from the Tilsit Gymnasium from there he went on to study law at the Ludwig-Maximilians-Universität München. In 1917, Zaunius defended his doctoral thesis in criminal and civil law at the University of Königsberg.

During his studies Zaunius joined the Lithuanian Conservative Election Societies headed by his father Dovas Zaunius. During World War I, he served in the German Army and after the German capitulation he was invited to work at the Lithuanian Ministry of Foreign Affairs as a qualified lawyer. From 1919 to 1920, he served as acting director of the Policy Department. In 1920, he was appointed Lithuanian affairs trustee in Latvia and Estonia.

Zaunius began his diplomatic career after his appointment as Envoy Extraordinary and Minister Plenipotentiary of Lithuania to Czechoslovakia and Romania (1924–1925). In 1925, he was made envoy to Switzerland and permanent representative of Lithuania to the League of Nations. In 1927, after the liquidation of the Lithuanian representation at the League of Nations, he returned to Lithuania and was appointed as secretary-general of the Foreign Ministry and envoy to Czechoslovakia.

On 8 November 1929, Zaunius became the Lithuanian Foreign Minister in the cabinet of Prime Minister Juozas Tūbelis. During his tenure, Lithuanian diplomats achieved some success at the Permanent Court of International Justice in cases against the Second Polish Republic (concerning rail traffic on the Libau–Romny Railway) and the Weimar Republic (concerning the dismissal of Otto Böttcher, President of the Directorate of the Klaipėda Region). Zaunius also made progress on forming the Baltic Entente.

From 1934 to 1936, he worked at the State Council of Lithuania, assisting with various agreements with foreign countries. After leaving the State Council in 1936, Zaunius became Chairman of the Board of the Bank of Lithuania (1936–1940) and Chairman of the Currency Commission. Zaunius also participated in activities of the Lithuanian Riflemen's Union, Union for the Liberation of Vilnius, and Scout Association of Lithuania.

Zaunis worked at the Bank of Lithuania until his death in 1940. He was buried at the Kaunas Evangelical Cemetery (now Ramybė Park).
