= Adalbert Bezzenberger =

German philologist (1851–1922)

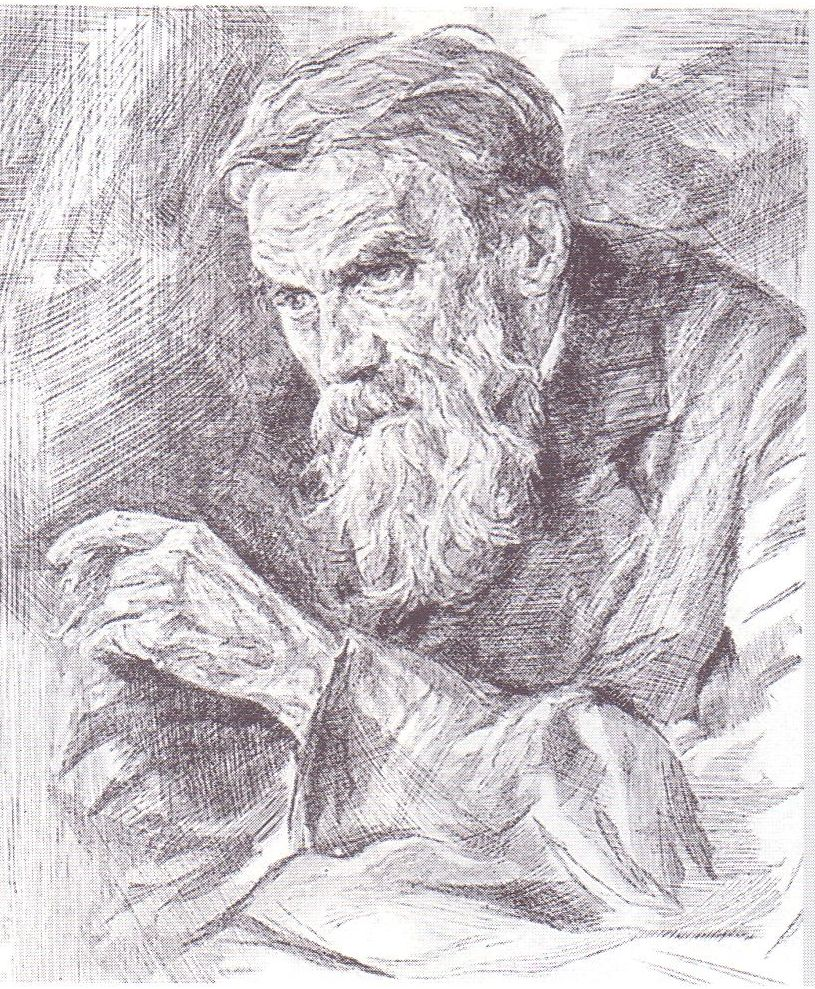
- An illustration of Bezzenberger by Heinrich Wolff
- Born: 14 April 1851; Kassel, Electorate of Hesse (now Germany)
- Died: 31 October 1922 (aged 71); Königsberg, Weimar Republic (now Kaliningrad, Russia)

Academic work
- Discipline: Indo-European linguistics
- Institutions: University of Göttingen; University of Königsberg

Adalbert Bezzenberger (14 April 1851 – 31 October 1922) was a German philologist. He was born in Kassel and died at Königsberg. He is considered to be the founder of Baltic philology.

He studied the Indo-Germanic languages at the University of Göttingen and the Ludwig-Maximilians-Universität München. In 1874, he became lecturer at the University of Göttingen and in 1879 professor of Sanskrit at the University of Königsberg. From 1890 to 1891, he was rector of this university.

== Published works ==
His principal works include:

- Beiträge zur Geschichte der Litauischen Sprache auf Grund litauischer Texte des 16. und 17. Jahrhunderts, Göttingen: Peppmüller, 1877.
- Litauische Forschungen. Beiträge zur Kenntniss der Sprache und des Volkstumes der Litauer, Göttingen: Peppmüller, 1882.
- Lettische Dialektstudien, Göttingen: Vandenhoeck & Ruprecht, 1885.
- Über der Sprache der Preußischen Letten, Göttingen: Vandenhoeck & Ruprecht, 1888.
- Die Kurische Nehrung und ihre Bewohner, Stuttgart: Engelhorn, 1889 (=Forschungen zur deutschen Landes- und Volkskunde; vols. 3-4)
- Sitzungsbericht der Altertumsgeschichte Prussia (1892)
- Analysen vorgeschichtlicher Bronzen Ostpreussens. An ihrem 60jährigen Stiftungstage dem Andenken ihres ehemaligen Vorsitzenden Georg Bujak gewidmet von der Altertumsgesellschaft Prussia, Königsberg: Gräfe & Unzer, 1904. (as editor)
- Beiträge zur Kunde der Indogermanischen Sprachen (1877–1906; as editor)
