= Martynas Jankus =

Prussian-Lithuanian printer, social activist and publisher

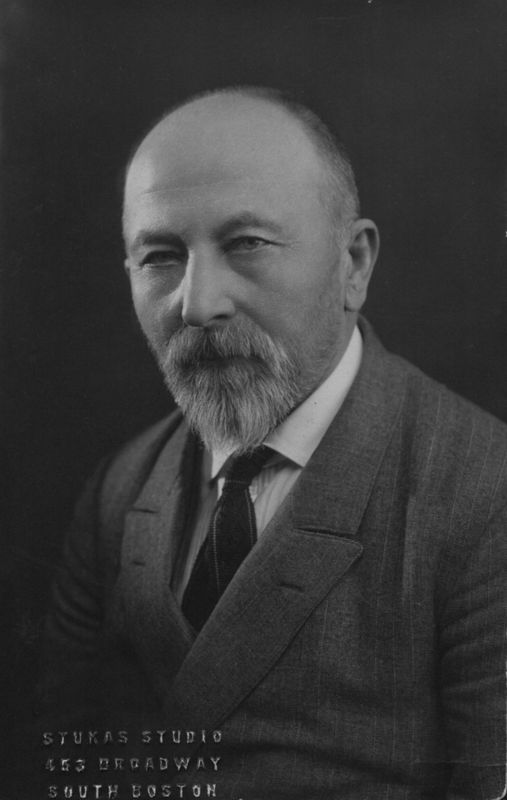
Martynas Jankus in United States in 1926

Martynas Jankus or Martin Jankus (7 August 1858 in Bittehnen (Lit.: Bitėnai), near Ragnit – 23 May 1946 in Flensburg, Germany, reburied in Bitėnai cemetery on 30 May 1993) was a Prussian-Lithuanian printer, social activist and publisher in East Prussia, called the Patriarch of Lithuania Minor. He was one of the publishers of Aušra, the first Lithuanian-language newspaper for both Lithuania Minor and Lithuania Major. Jankus used various pen names, including V. Giedris, Martyneitis, Bitėnų Merčius, and Gyvoleitis.

== Biography ==
After graduating from a primary school in Bitėnai, Jankus continued self-education. From the last decade of the 19th century he was an important figure in the pro-Lithuanian movement, and was close to the Lithuanian National Revival movement in Lithuania. He was one of the founders of several cultural organizations, including the Birutė Society, founded in 1885 in Tilsit. From 1889 to 1892 Jankus was its chairman. In 1890, together with Dovas Zaunius and Jonas Smalakis, Jankus founded the first Lithuanian political organization in East Prussia. He maintained active correspondence with Lithuanian Americans and activists of the Latvian, Polish and Belarusian national movements.

For his public activities Jankus was penalized by the Prussian authorities about forty times – arrests, monetary fines, and the like. He spent his earnings on the publication of Lithuanian books and newspapers during the Lithuanian press ban in Russia. Jankus was one of the suppliers for the knygnešiai, smugglers of illegal books into Russia. After the Russian Empire occupied the Klaipėda Region in December 1914, Jankus and his family were deported to Samara Governorate in Siberia, where his father and his youngest son Andrius died. In 1918, Jankus returned to his homeland, where he actively promoted the idea of incorporating Lithuania Minor into Lithuania proper. In November 1918, Jankus signed the Act of Tilsit. In 1920 he was co-opted into the Council of Lithuania and later became chairman of the Supreme Salvation Committee of Lithuania Minor. In 1925 Jankus returned to live in Bitėnai.

After the Klaipėda Region was seized by Germany following the ultimatum of 1939, Jankus moved to Kaunas, the temporary capital of Lithuania. During the Nazi occupation he was forbidden to deliver public speeches. In 1944 he returned to Bitėnai and was forced to evacuate by Nazi authorities. Martynas Jankus died in Germany, but expressed his will to his daughter that his body should be burned and, when Lithuania had regained independence, his ashes should be moved to the Bitėnai cemetery.

=== Publisher ===
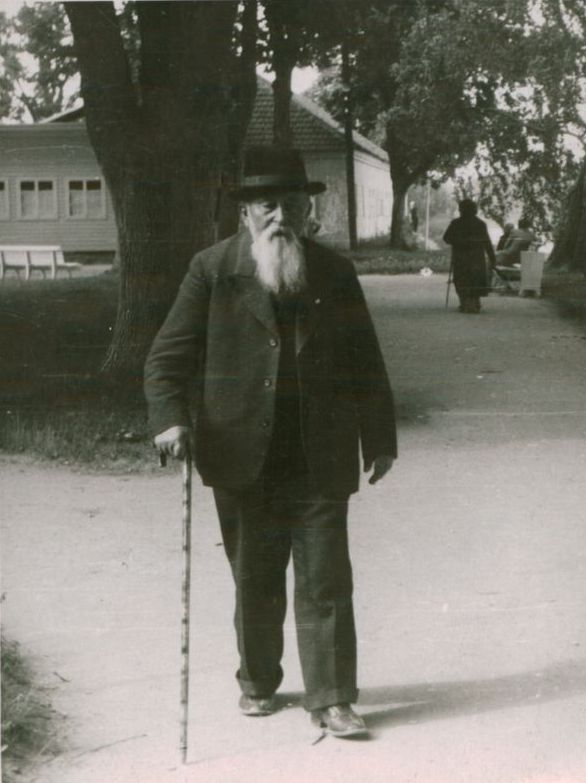
Jankus in 1939

During 1882 and 1883 Jankus published Lithuanian songs that he had collected himself. In 1883 he was one of the founders of Aušra, the first Lithuanian-language newspaper. Jankus not only supported the publication financially, but also served as its editor. He also published Aušros kalendorius (1884–1885) and the newspaper Garsas (1886–1887). Jankus was also behind the first Lithuanian-language satirical newspaper Tetutė. Other newspapers published by Jankus include Naujoji Aušra (1892), Lietuviškas darbininkas (1894), Ūkininkų prietelius, Saulėteka (1900–1902), Dienos lapas (1909–1910, Jankus was an editor), Varpas and Ūkininkas. Jankus himself wrote forty-five books and booklets.

== Printing house ==
In 1889 he bought a printing house in Ragnit, which was later moved to Tilsit where it was active until 1892. Then the printing house was moved to Jankus' own house in Bitėnai, where it operated until 1909. At its peak, the house had three printing machines. It is estimated that Jankus's printing house published at least 360 books and twenty-five periodicals. During the Lithuanian press ban in Russia, Bitėnai also served as a warehouse for illegal Lithuanian books and the Aušra archives. After the Lithuanian press ban was lifted in 1904, the printing house lost its significance and went bankrupt in 1909. The equipment was sold in 1912.

Many works by Lithuanian authors were published for the first time by Jankus. Such works included the historical novel Senutė by Vydūnas, over fifty booklets by Petras Vileišis, the first chapter of Metai by Kristijonas Donelaitis, and other works by contemporary Lithuanian authors, including Jonas Biliūnas, Lazdynų Pelėda, Gabrielė Petkevičaitė-Bitė, Antanas Kriščiukaitis-Aišbė, and others.

== Awards ==
- 1928 – awarded Order of the Lithuanian Grand Duke Gediminas, 3rd level
- 1938 – awarded Order of Vytautas the Great, 2nd level
- 1928 – awarded Crown Order by Italy, 3rd level
- 1939 – bust was built in Kaunas
- 1981 – Martynas Jankus memorial museum was established in Bitėnai. In 1999 it was moved to the reconstructed Jankus printing house.
