= Juozas Domarkas =

Lithuanian musician (born 1936)

Juozas Domarkas (born 28 July 1936) is a Lithuanian musician, music teacher and conductor, and a professor at the Lithuanian Academy of Music and Theatre (LMTA).

== Life ==
Domarkas was born in Varkaliai, Nausodis eldership, Plungė District Municipality. From 1955 to 1960 he studied the clarinet at the Lithuanian Conservatory (forerunner of the present LMTA) and in 1965 he studied conducting at the Leningrad Conservatory with Ilya Musin. In 1963 he trained in Moscow with Igor Markevitch. From 1964 Domarkas was artistic director and principal conductor of the Lithuanian National Symphony Orchestra in Vilnius. From 1968 he has taught at the Lithuanian Academy of Music and Theatre where since 1995 he has also held the professorship of conducting in the music faculty. From 1972 to 1991 he also directed the student symphony orchestra of the music high school.

== Distinctions ==
Prizes

- 1974: State Prize of Soviet Lithuania
- 1998: Art Prize of the Lithuanian Government
- 2000: Lithuanian National Prize for Culture and Arts

Orders

- 1994: Order of the Lithuanian Grand Duke Gediminas, 4th Class
- 1998: Order of the Lithuanian Grand Duke Gediminas, 1st Class
- 2006: Knight's Cross of the Order of Merit of the Republic of Poland

== Honours ==
- 2003: Citizen of Honour of the Plungė District Municipality

== Sources ==
- Audronė Žigaitytė-Nekrošienė: Juozas Domarkas - Visuotinė lietuvių enciklopedija, T. V (Dis-Fatva). – Vilnius: Mokslo ir enciklopedijų leidybos institutas, 2004, 62 psl.
