= Nausodis Eldership =

Nausodis eldership Nausodžio seniūnija
- Eldership
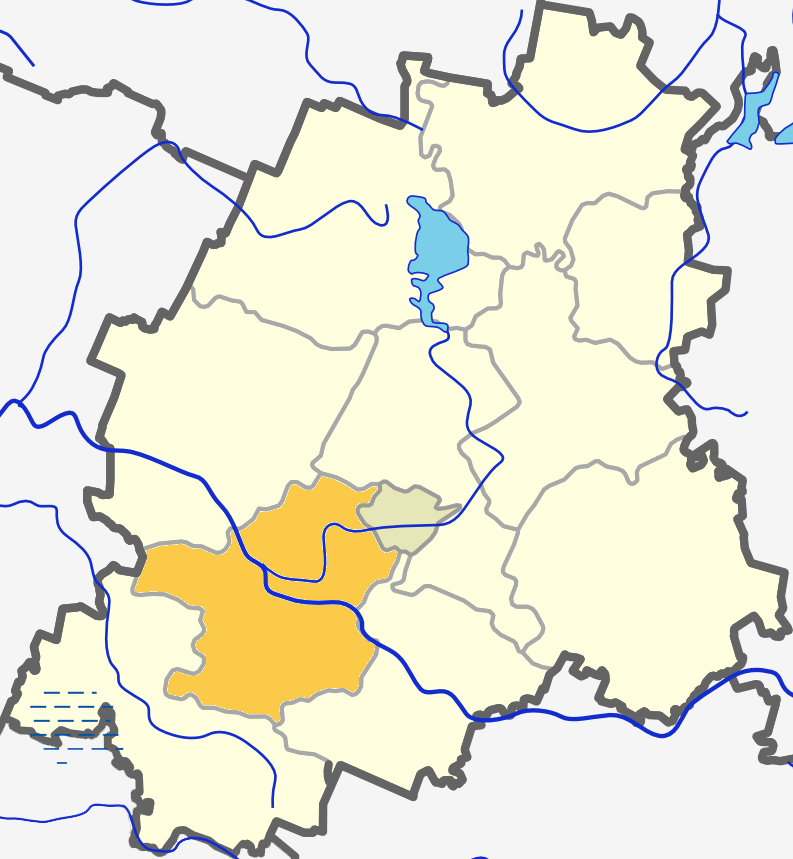
- Location in the Plungė District Municipality

- Location in Lithuania
- Coordinates: 55°51′N 21°45′E
- Country: Lithuania
- County: Telšiai County
- Municipality: Plungė District Municipality
- Seat: Varkaliai

Area
  - Total: 81.5 km^{2} (31.5 sq mi)

Population (2011)
  - Total: 3,673
  - Density: 45.1/km^{2} (117/sq mi)
- Time zone: UTC+2 (EET)
  - Summer (DST): UTC+3 (EEST)

Nausodis eldership (Lithuanian: Nausodžio seniūnija) is an eldership in Plungė District Municipality, Lithuania. It is located to the southwest of Plungė. The administrative center is Varkaliai.

== Largest towns and villages ==
- Varkaliai
- Prūsaliai
- Kaušėnai
- Karklėnai
- Stonaičiai
- Vieštovėnai
- Juodeikiai

=== Other villages ===
- Gandinga
- Jodėnai (a part of village)
- Kalniškiai (a part of village)
- Kleipščiai
- Maceniai
- Mardosai
- Mažiavos
- Nausodis
- Noriškiai
- Santakis
- Šložiai
