= Pakerai =

- Village
- Location of Pakerai
- Coordinates: 55°53′N 21°51′E
- Country: Lithuania
- Ethnographic region: Samogitia
- County: Telšiai County
- Municipality: Plungė district municipality
- Eldership: Babrungas eldership

Population (2011)
  - Total: 154
- Time zone: UTC+2 (EET)
  - Summer (DST): UTC+3 (EEST)

Pakerai (Samogitian: Pakerā) is a village in the Plungė district municipality, to the south from Plungė.

As of 2011, there were 154 inhabitants living in this village.
