= Kuliai Eldership =

Kuliai eldership Kulių seniūnija
- Eldership
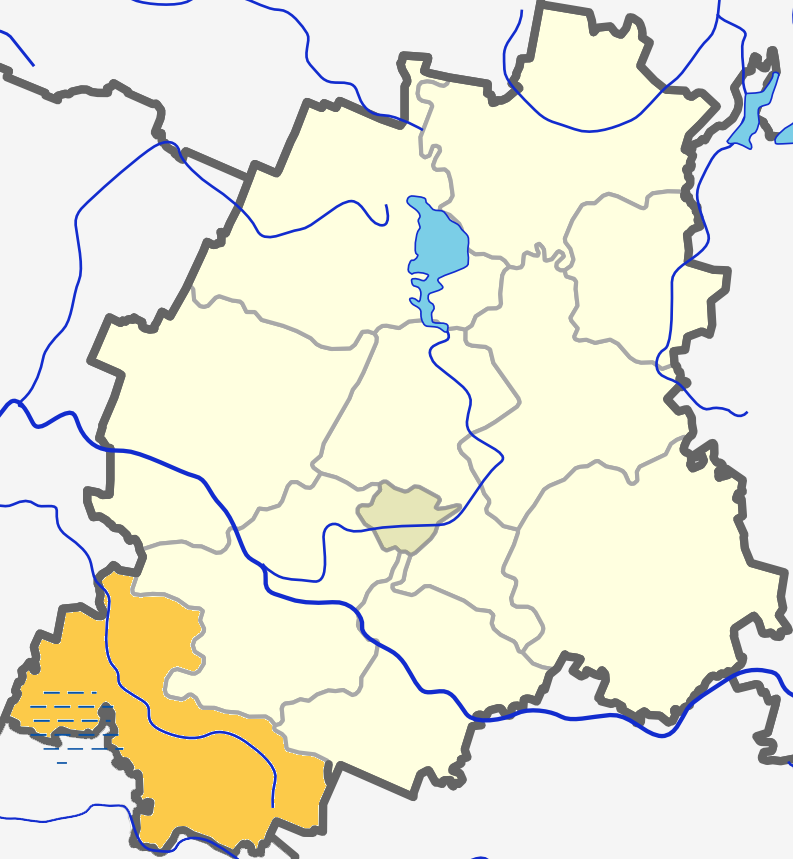
- Location in the Plungė District Municipality

- Location in Lithuania
- Coordinates: 55°48′N 21°40′E
- Country: Lithuania
- County: Telšiai County
- Municipality: Plungė District Municipality
- Seat: Kuliai

Area
  - Total: 128.45 km^{2} (49.59 sq mi)

Population (2011)
  - Total: 1,193
  - Density: 9.288/km^{2} (24.05/sq mi)
- Time zone: UTC+2 (EET)
  - Summer (DST): UTC+3 (EEST)

Kuliai eldership (Lithuanian: Kulių seniūnija) is an eldership in Plungė District Municipality, in Lithuania. It is located to the southwest of Plungė. The administrative center of the eldership is Kuliai.

== Largest towns and villages ==
- Kuliai
- Kumžaičiai
- Šiemuliai

=== Other villages ===
- Blidakiai
- Čiūželiai (no inhabitants)
- Didieji Mostaičiai
- Karklėnai (a part of village)
- Mažieji Mostaičiai
- Mižuikai
- Paalantis
- Palioniškiai
- Reiskiai
