= Babrungas (disambiguation) =

Babrungas may refer to:

- Babrungas, a village in the Plungė district municipality, Lithuania
- Babrungas Eldership, an administrative eldership, Lithuania
- Babrungas River, Lithuania
- FK Babrungas Plungė, football club in Plungė, Lithuania
