= Plateliai Eldership =

Plateliai eldership Platelių seniūnija
- Eldership
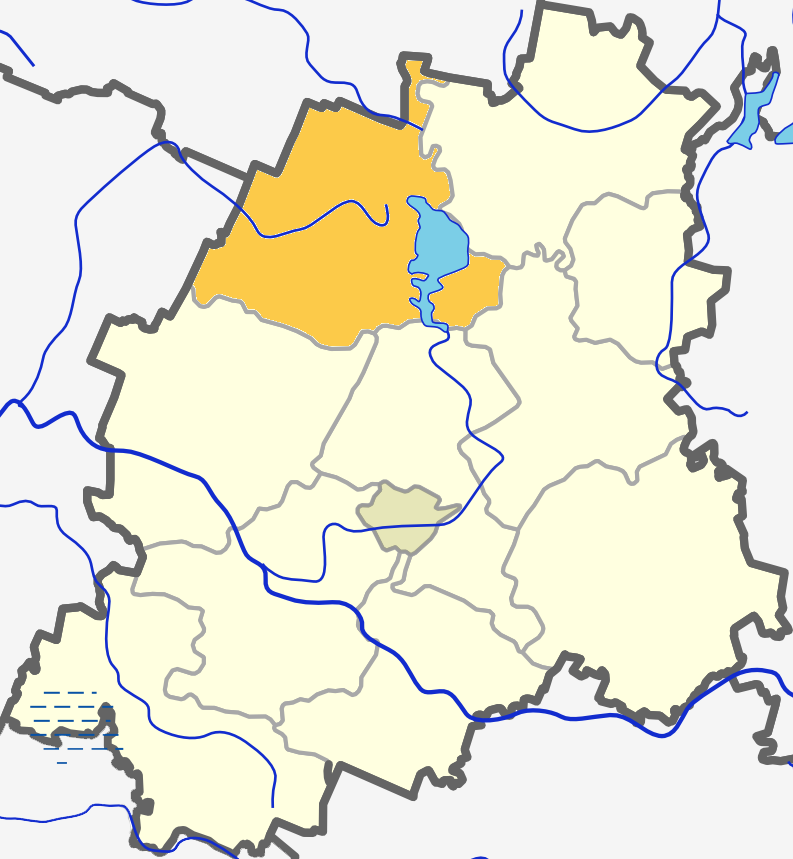
- Location in the Plungė District Municipality

- Location in Lithuania
- Coordinates: 56°2′N 21°45′E
- Country: Lithuania
- County: Telšiai County
- Municipality: Plungė District Municipality
- Seat: Plateliai

Area
  - Total: 136.5 km^{2} (52.7 sq mi)

Population (2011)
  - Total: 1,932
  - Density: 14.15/km^{2} (36.66/sq mi)
- Time zone: UTC+2 (EET)
  - Summer (DST): UTC+3 (EEST)

Plateliai eldership (Lithuanian: Platelių seniūnija) is an eldership in Plungė District Municipality in Lithuania. It is located to the northwest of Plungė. The administrative center is Plateliai. The eldership includes Lake Plateliai.

== Largest towns and villages ==
- Plateliai
- Gintališkė
- Šateikių Rūdaičiai
- Dovainiai
- Beržoras

=== Other villages ===
- Antsieniai
- Atlaužai
- Gilaičiai
- Jockiai
- Kadžiai
- Kentai
- Lygiosios
- Mačiūkiai
- Medsėdžiai
- Mikytai
- Paežerės Rūdaičiai
- Pamedinčiai
- Plokščiai
- Pūčkoriai (part of village, no inhabitants)
- Rėžgaliai
- Stirbaičiai
- Užpelkiai
- Virkšai
- Visvainiai (part of village)
- Zobielai
