= Krakiai =

- Village
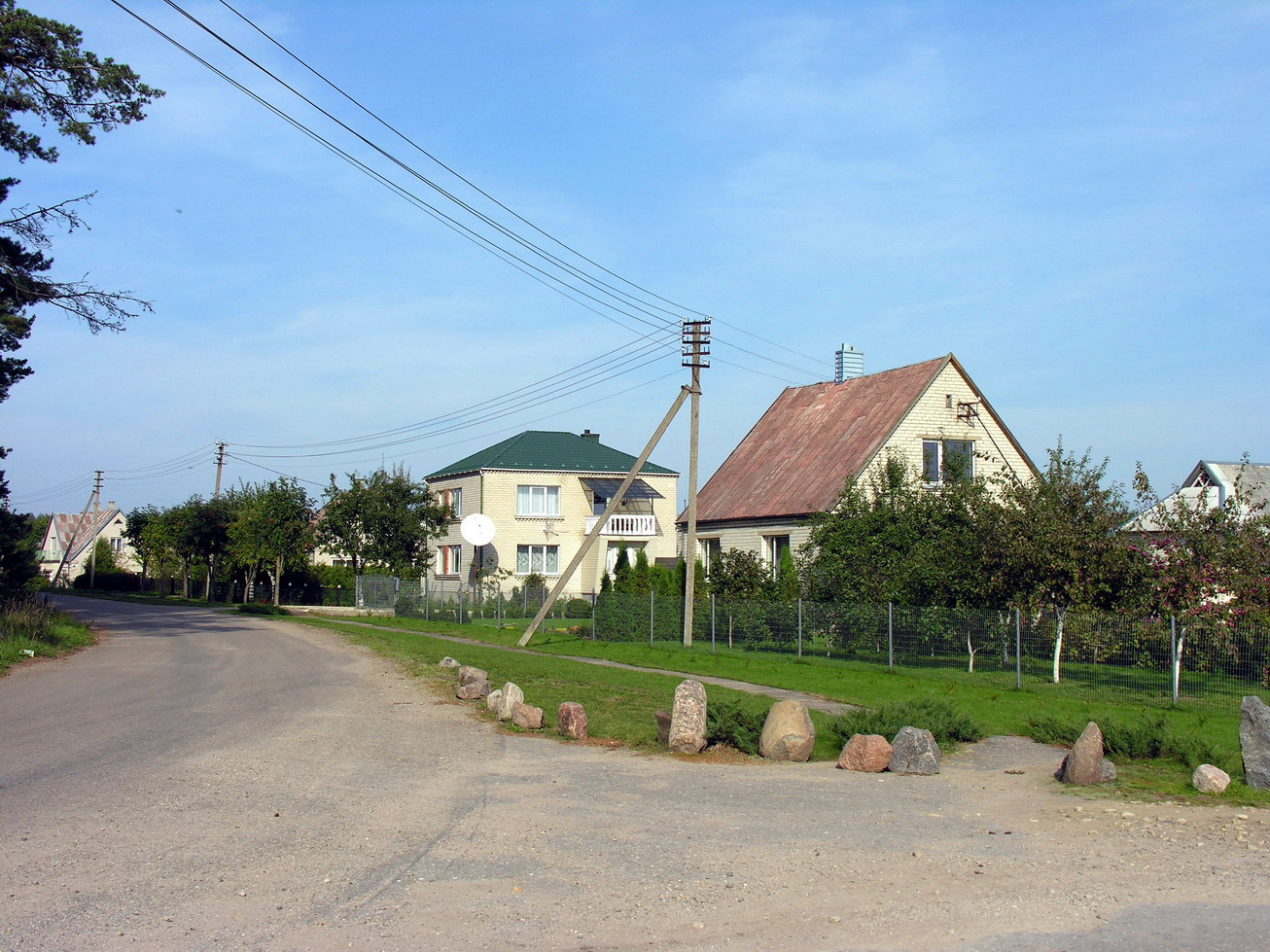

- Location of Krakiai
- Coordinates: 56°17′N 22°24′E
- Country: Lithuania
- Ethnographic region: Samogitia
- County: Telšiai County
- Municipality: Mažeikiai district municipality
- Eldership: Mažeikiai rural eldership
- First mentioned: 1661

Population (2011)
  - Total: 621
- Time zone: UTC+2 (EET)
  - Summer (DST): UTC+3 (EEST)

Krakiai (Samogitian: Krakē), a village on Venta River in Northeastern Lithuania, Mažeikiai district municipality. It is 6 km to the southeast of Mažeikiai. According to the 2011 census, the town has a population of 621 people. In historical documents Krakiai was first mentioned in 1661.
