= Žlibinai Eldership =

Žlibinai eldership Žlibinų seniūnija
- Eldership
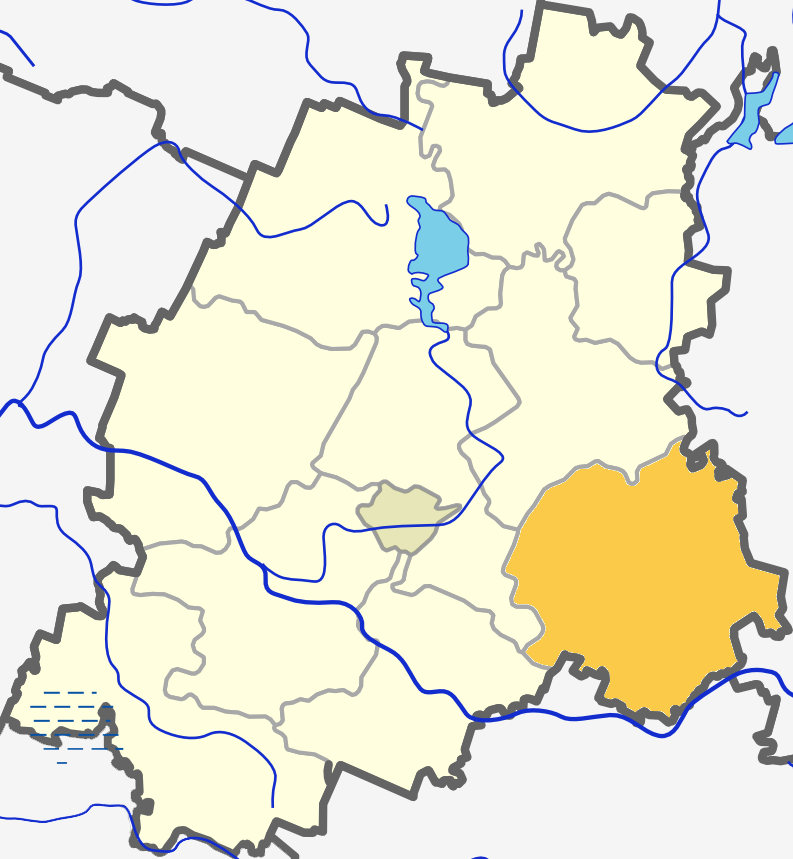
- Location in the Plungė District Municipality

- Location in Lithuania
- Coordinates: 55°53′N 22°3′E
- Country: Lithuania
- County: Telšiai
- Municipality: Plungė District
- Seat: Žlibinai

Area
  - Total: 140.34 km^{2} (54.19 sq mi)

Population (2011)
  - Total: 1,413
  - Density: 10.07/km^{2} (26.08/sq mi)
- Time zone: UTC+2 (EET)
  - Summer (DST): UTC+3 (EEST)

Žlibinai eldership (Lithuanian: Žlibinų seniūnija) is an eldership in Plungė District Municipality, in Lithuania. It lies to the east of Plungė. The administrative center is Žlibinai.

== Largest villages ==
- Kantaučiai
- Žlibinai
- Keturakiai
- Purvaičiai
- Kapsūdžiai

=== Other villages ===
- Abokai
- Bernotavas
- Drūkčiai
- Gaižupiai
- Jėrubaičiai (a part of village)
- Kalniškiai (no inhabitants)
- Kepurėnai
- Liekniai
- Marciai
- Medingėnai
- Naručiai (no inhabitants)
- Rimučiai (no inhabitants)
- Sausdravėnai
- Saušilis
- Smilgiai
- Šarkiai (no inhabitants)
- Šašaičiai
- Varnaičiai
- Vydeikiai
- Vilkaičiai
- Zalepūgai
- Žvirzdaliai
