= Varniai Eldership =

Eldership of Lithuania

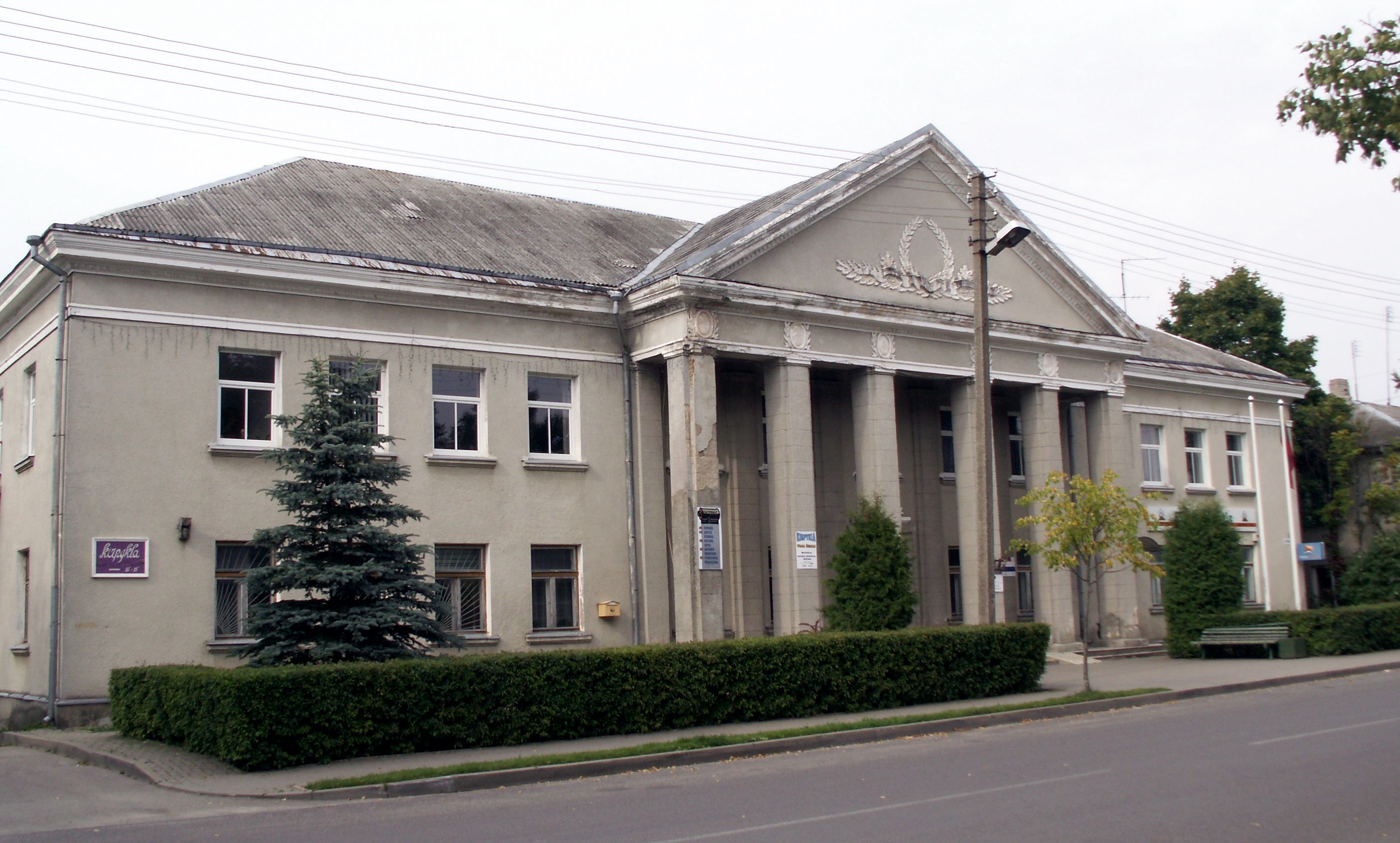
Varniai culture center

The Varniai Eldership (Lithuanian: Varnių seniūnija) is an eldership of Lithuania, located in the Telšiai District Municipality. In 2021 its population was 2857.
