= LNSO =

LNSO may refer to:

- Latvian National Symphony Orchestra
- Lithuanian National Symphony Orchestra
