= Degaičiai Eldership =

Eldership of Lithuania

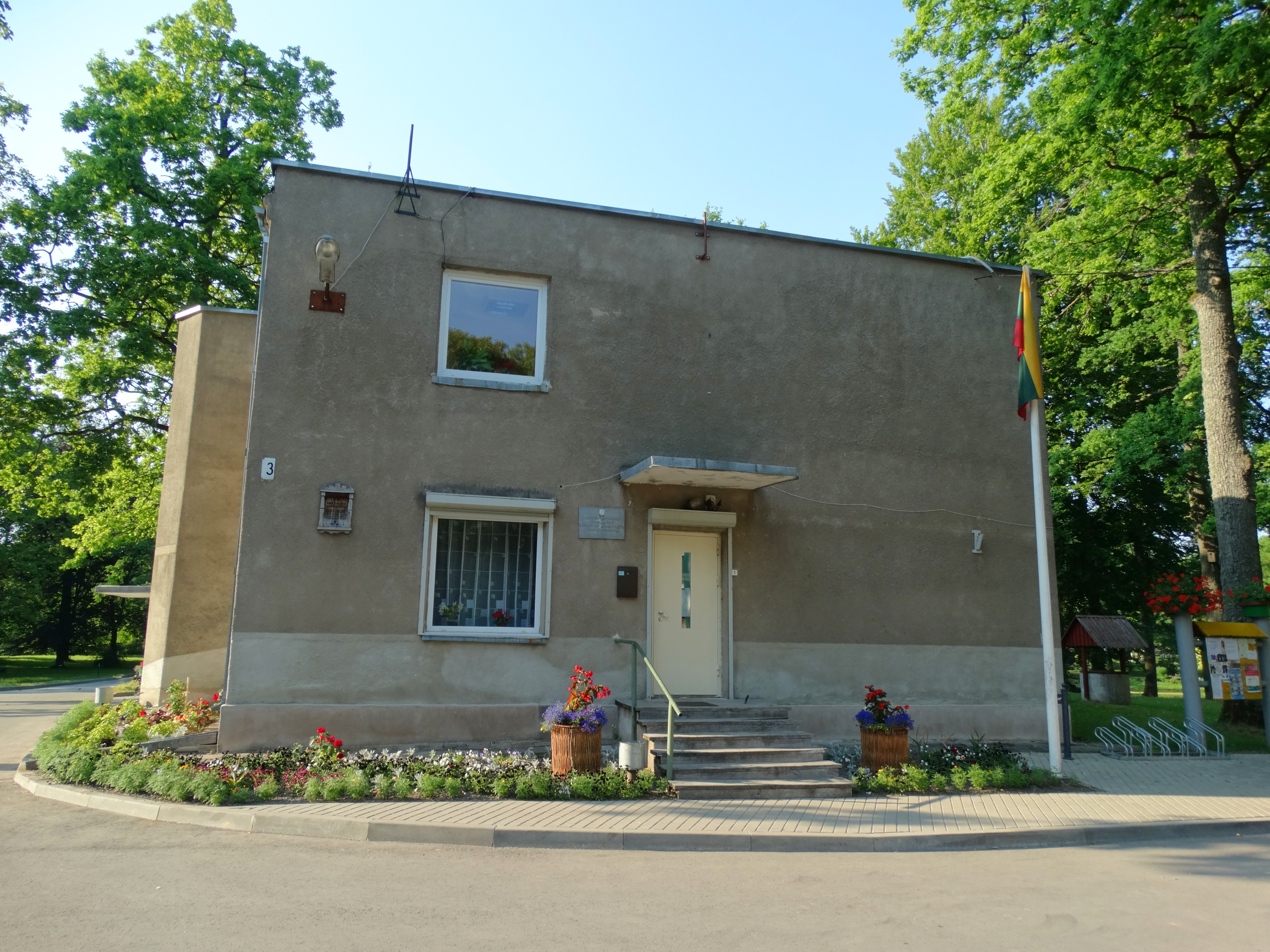
Eldership, Degaičiai, Telšiai district, Lithuania

The Degaičiai Eldership (Lithuanian: Degaičių seniūnija) is an eldership of Lithuania, located in the Telšiai District Municipality. In 2021 its population was 1759.
