= Telšiai uezd =

County of the Russian Empire

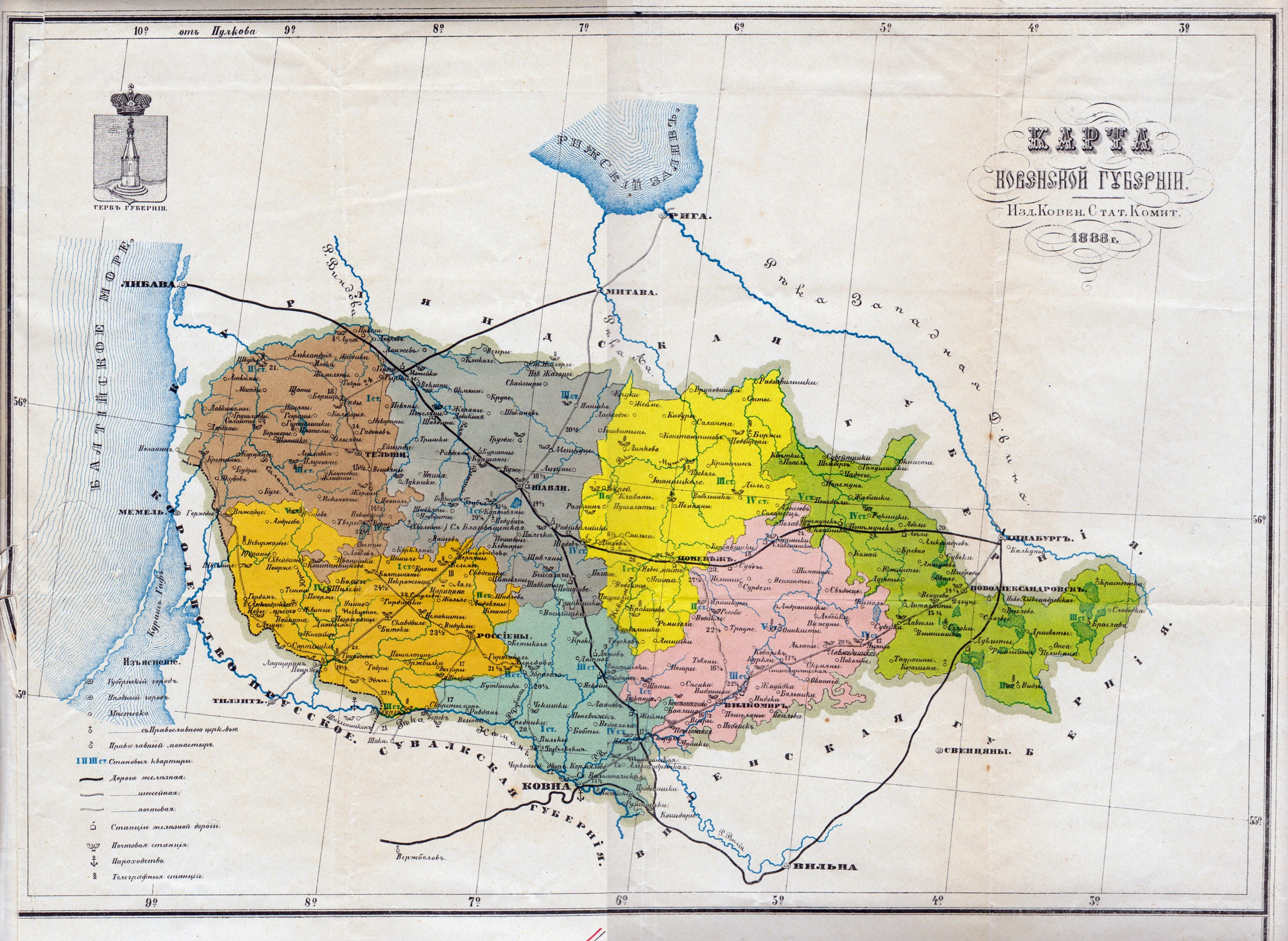

Telšiai uezd (Russian: Тельшевский уезд, romanized: Telshevsky uezd) was one of the counties of the Russian Empire. The seat was in Telšiai.

== Administration ==
In 1819, the Palangos valsčius came to Grobin County of Courland Governorate.

=== Outer administration ===
It was established in 1795 under Vilna Governorate. In 1843, it was transferred to a newly established Kovno Governorate.

=== Inner administration ===
In 1791, it the following povets: Telšių pavietas, Viešvėnų pavietas, Patumšių pavietas, Platelių pavietas, Gandingos pavietas, Medingėnų pavietas, Žarėnų pavietas, Tverų pavietas, Šauduvos pavietas, Palangos pavietas.

In 1913, it had the following povets:

- Paukštakiai
- Varniai
- Nevarėnai
- Gintališkė
- Gargždai
- Darbėnai
- Židikai
- Žarėnai
- Ylakiai
- Kartena
- Kretinga
- Mosėdis
- Alsėdžiai
- Plungė
- Salantai
- Seda
- Tirkšliai
- Skuodas

== Demographics ==
At the time of the Russian Empire Census of 1897, Telshevsky Uyezd had a population of 183,351. Of these, 81.2% spoke Lithuanian, 12.4% Yiddish, 2.3% Latvian, 1.5% Polish, 1.3% Russian, 0.9% German, 0.3% Ukrainian and 0.1% Belarusian as their native language.
