= Viešvėnai Eldership =

Eldership of Lithuania

The Viešvėnai Eldership (Lithuanian: Viešvėnų seniūnija) is an eldership of Lithuania, located in the Telšiai District Municipality. In 2021 its population was 2191.
