= Mažeikiai Area Eldership =

Eldership of Lithuania

The Mažeikiai Area Eldership (Lithuanian: Mažeikių apylinkės seniūnija) is an eldership of Lithuania, located in the Mažeikiai District Municipality. In 2021 its population was 3340.
