= Stalgėnai Eldership =

Stalgėnai eldership Stalgėnų seniūnija
- Eldership
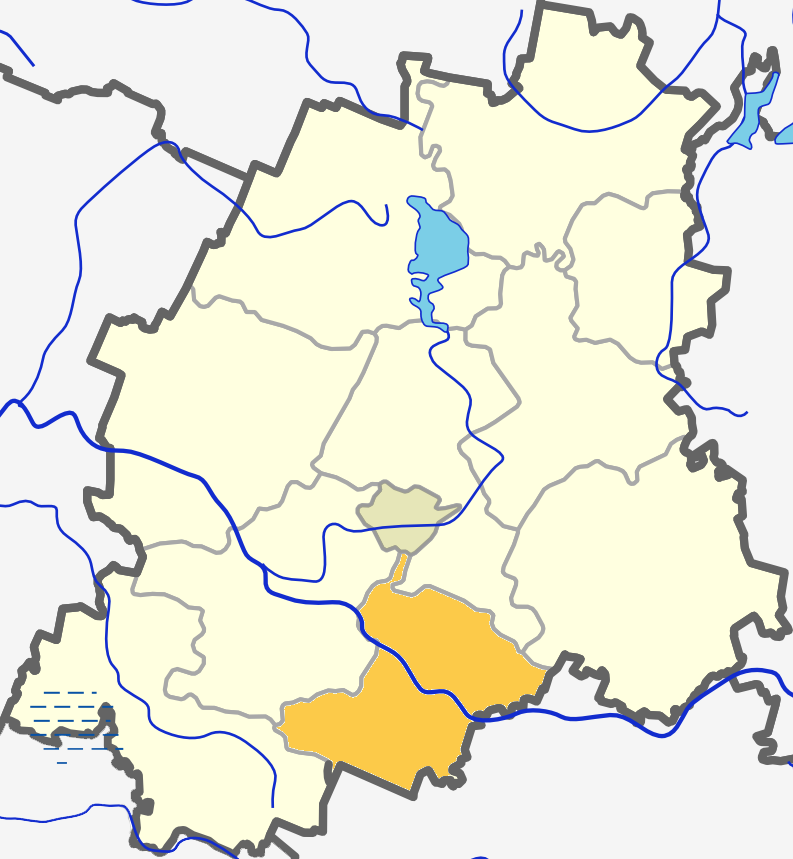
- Location in the Plungė District Municipality

- Location in Lithuania
- Coordinates: 55°50′N 21°50′E
- Country: Lithuania
- County: Telšiai County
- Municipality: Plungė District Municipality
- Seat: Stalgėnai

Area
  - Total: 82.5 km^{2} (31.9 sq mi)

Population (2011)
  - Total: 974
  - Density: 11.8/km^{2} (30.6/sq mi)
- Time zone: UTC+2 (EET)
  - Summer (DST): UTC+3 (EEST)

Stalgėnai eldership (Lithuanian: Stalgėnų seniūnija) is an eldership in the centre of Plungė District Municipality, in Lithuania. The administrative center is Stalgėnai.

== Largest villages ==
- Stalgėnai
- Milašaičiai
- Luknėnai

=== Other villages ===
- Kalniškiai
- Lekemė
- Rapšaičiai
- Stalgas
- Vainaičiai
- Vitkai
