= Šerkšnėnai Eldership =

Eldership of Lithuania

The Šerkšnėnai Eldership (Lithuanian: Šerkšnėnų seniūnija) is an eldership of Lithuania, located in the Mažeikiai District Municipality. In 2021 its population was 1561.
