= Reivyčiai Eldership =

Eldership of Lithuania

The Reivyčiai Eldership (Lithuanian: Reivyčių seniūnija) is an eldership of Lithuania, located in the Mažeikiai District Municipality. In 2021 its population was 1674.
