= Babrungas =

- Village
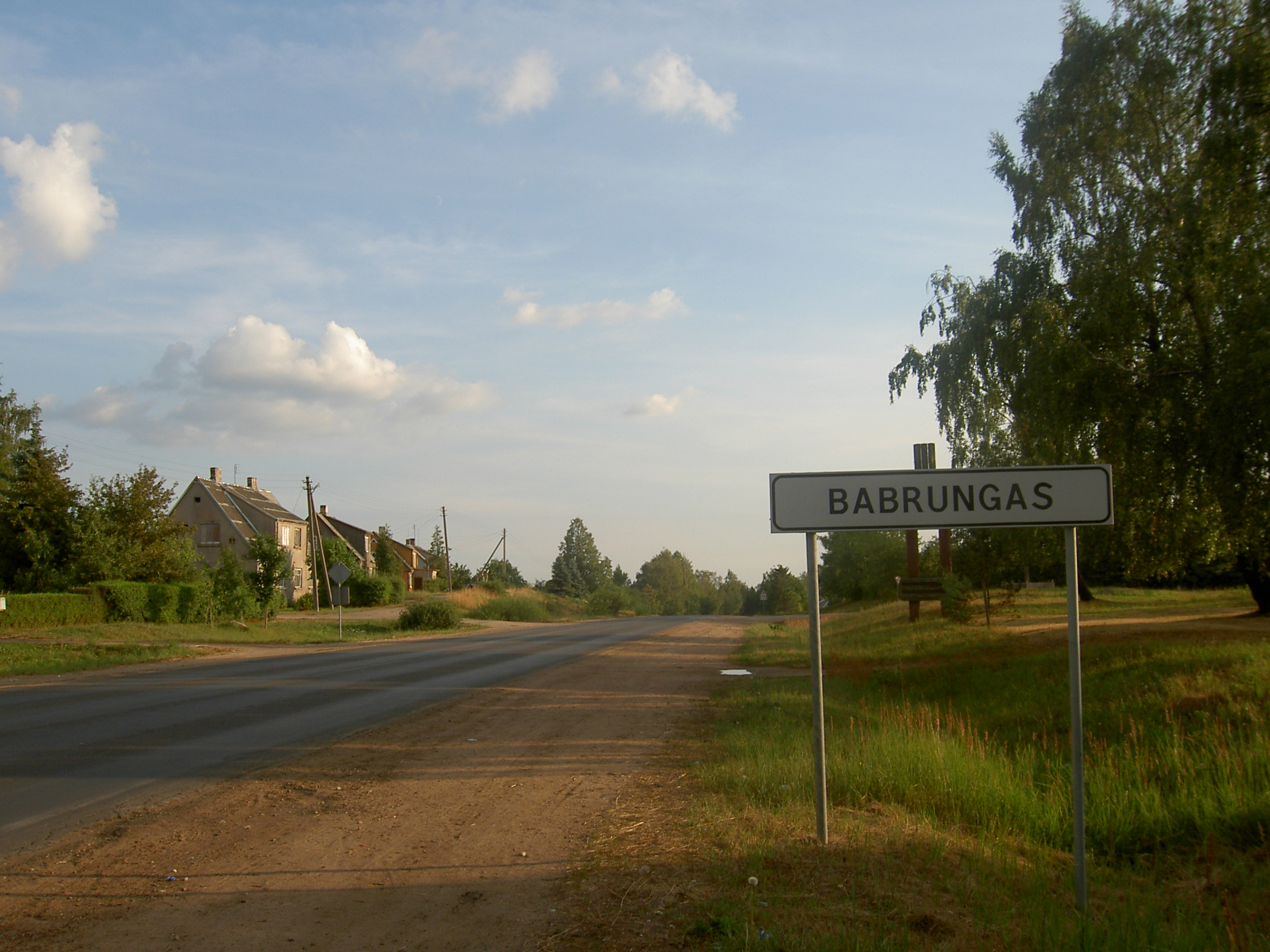

- Location of Babrungas
- Coordinates: 55°56′N 21°52′E
- Country: Lithuania
- Ethnographic region: Samogitia
- County: Telšiai County
- Municipality: Plungė district municipality
- Eldership: Babrungas eldership
- Capital of: Babrungas eldership

Population (2011)
  - Total: 612
- Time zone: UTC+2 (EET)
  - Summer (DST): UTC+3 (EEST)

Babrungas (Samogitian: Babrungs) is a village in the Plungė district municipality, Lithuania. It is located on the bank of Babrungas River.

Babrungas is an administrative center of Babrungas eldership.

As of 2011, there were 612 inhabitants living in this village.
