= Žemaičių Kalvarija Eldership =

Žemaičių Kalvarija eldership Žemaičių Kalvarijos seniūnija
- Eldership
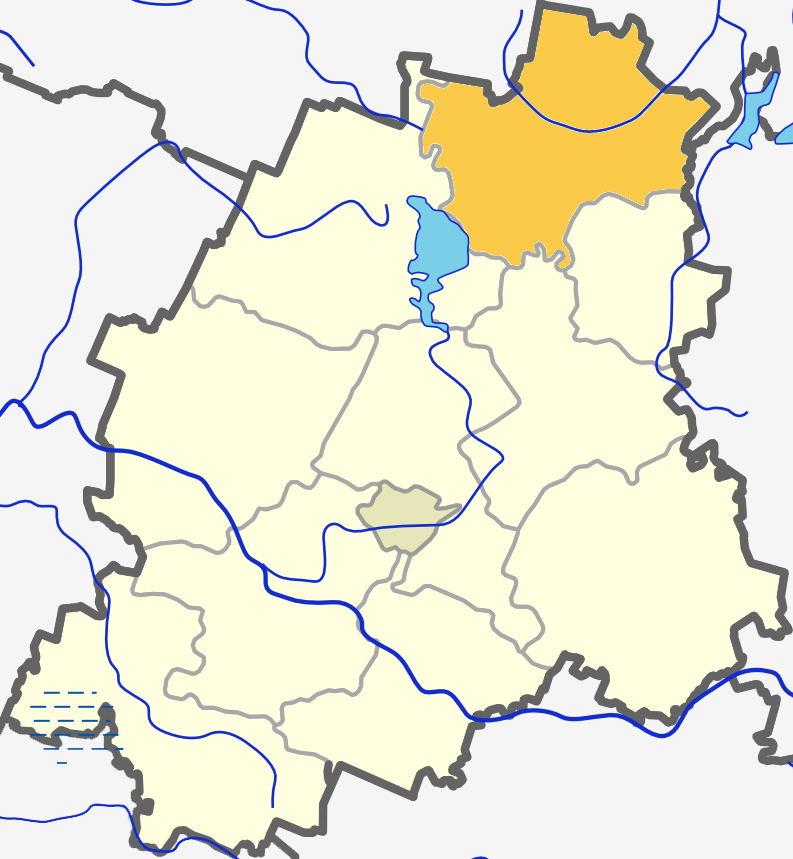
- Location in the Plungė District Municipality

- Location in Lithuania
- Coordinates: 56°5′N 21°55′E
- Country: Lithuania
- County: Telšiai County
- Municipality: Plungė District Municipality
- Seat: Žemaičių Kalvarija

Area
  - Total: 124.62 km^{2} (48.12 sq mi)

Population (2011)
  - Total: 1,970
  - Density: 15.8/km^{2} (40.9/sq mi)
- Time zone: UTC+2 (EET)
  - Summer (DST): UTC+3 (EEST)

Žemaičių Kalvarija eldership (Lithuanian: Žemaičių Kalvarijos seniūnija) is an eldership in Plungė District Municipality, Lithuania to the northeast from Plungė. The administrative center is Žemaičių Kalvarija.

== Largest towns and villages ==
- Žemaičių Kalvarija
- Gegrėnai
- Rotinėnai
- Šarnelė
- Virkšai
- Jazdauskiškiai

=== Other villages ===
- Alkai
- Bertuliai
- Dargaičiai
- Degučiai
- Galvyčiai
- Gečaičiai
- Getaučiai
- Kūbakiai
- Likšai
- Paežerės Rūdaičiai (a part of village)
- Paplatelė
- Platakiai
- Pūčkoriai
- Skurvydai
- Stankaičiai
- Šašaičiai
- Uogučiai
- Užbradumė
- Vilkai
- Visvainiai
- Žerniai
