= Gandinga (disambiguation) =

Gandinga is a village in Lithuania.

Gandinga may also refer to:

- Gandinga hillfort, Lithuania
- Gandinga Landscape Reserve, Lithuania
- Gandinga, a stew made of beef or pork offal in the cuisines of Cuba and Puerto Rico
- Don Louis Gandinga, 18th-century knoiwn for the Second Battle of Casteldelfino
