= Paukštakiai Eldership =

Paukštakiai eldership Paukštakių seniūnija
- Eldership
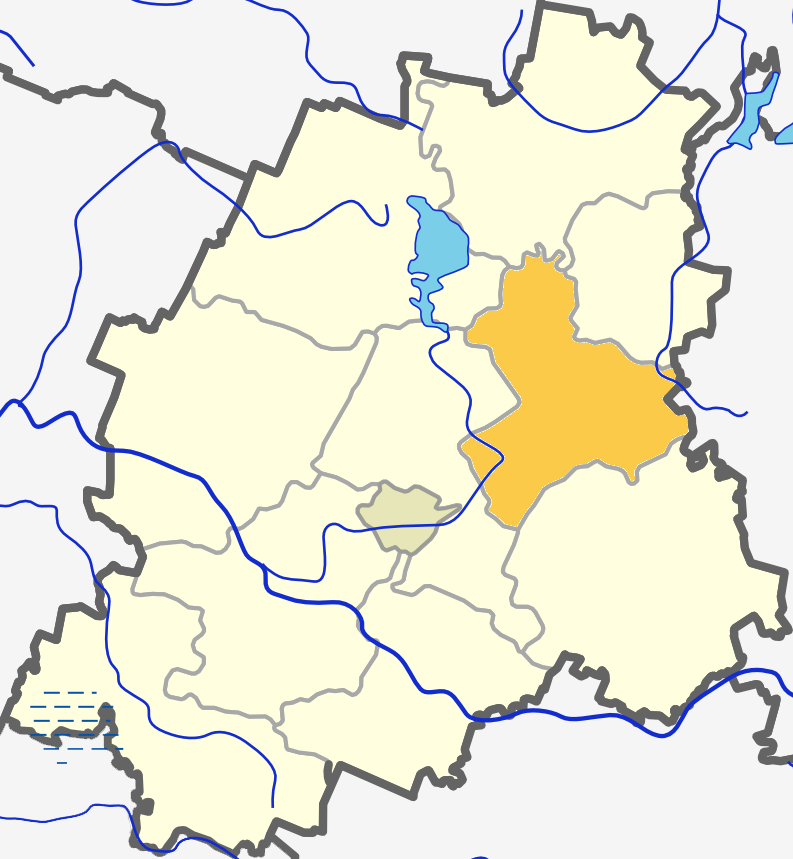
- Location in the Plungė District Municipality

- Location in Lithuania
- Coordinates: 55°58′N 21°59′E
- Country: Lithuania
- County: Telšiai County
- Municipality: Plungė District Municipality
- Seat: Grumbliai

Area
  - Total: 96.83 km^{2} (37.39 sq mi)

Population (2011)
  - Total: 1,179
  - Density: 12.18/km^{2} (31.54/sq mi)
- Time zone: UTC+2 (EET)
  - Summer (DST): UTC+3 (EEST)

Paukštakiai eldership (Lithuanian: Paukštakių seniūnija) is an eldership in Plungė District Municipality, Lithuania. It is located to the east of Plungė. The administrative center is Grumbliai.

== Largest villages ==
- Staneliai
- Grumbliai
- Paukštakiai

=== Other villages ===
- Aleksiai (a part of village, no inhabitants)
- Božiai
- Dilbšiai
- Dišliai (a part of village, no inhabitants)
- Endriuškaičiai
- Gelindėnai
- Jogaudai
- Jonikai
- Juodeikiai
- Kėkštai
- Kepurėnai (kaimo dalis)
- Kulskiai
- Lankos Laukas
- Lazdeniai
- Merkeliai
- Molupiai
- Naručiai (a part of village, no inhabitants)
- Nešukuočiai
- Nugariai
- Paburgė
- Paežerė
- Paišiotai
- Paluokė
- Plokščiai (a part of village, no inhabitants)
- Raišaičiai
- Rukundžiai
- Skyplaičiai
- Svirpliai
- Šlečkai
- Šlepečiai
- Tarvainiai
- Vaištarai
