= Luokė Eldership =

Eldership of Lithuania

Luokė Eldership Luokės seniūnija
- Eldership
- Interactive map of Luokė Eldership
- Coordinates: 55°53′25″N 22°31′48″E
- Country: Lithuania
- Municipality: Telšiai District Municipality

Population (2021)
  - Total: 1,392
- Time zone: UTC+2 (EET)
  - Summer (DST): UTC+3 (EEST)

Luokė eldership, Telšiai district, Lithuania

The Luokė Eldership (Lithuanian: Luokės seniūnija) is an eldership of Lithuania, located in the Telšiai District Municipality. In 2021 its population was 1392.
