= Šateikiai Eldership =

Šateikiai eldership Šateikių seniūnija
- Eldership
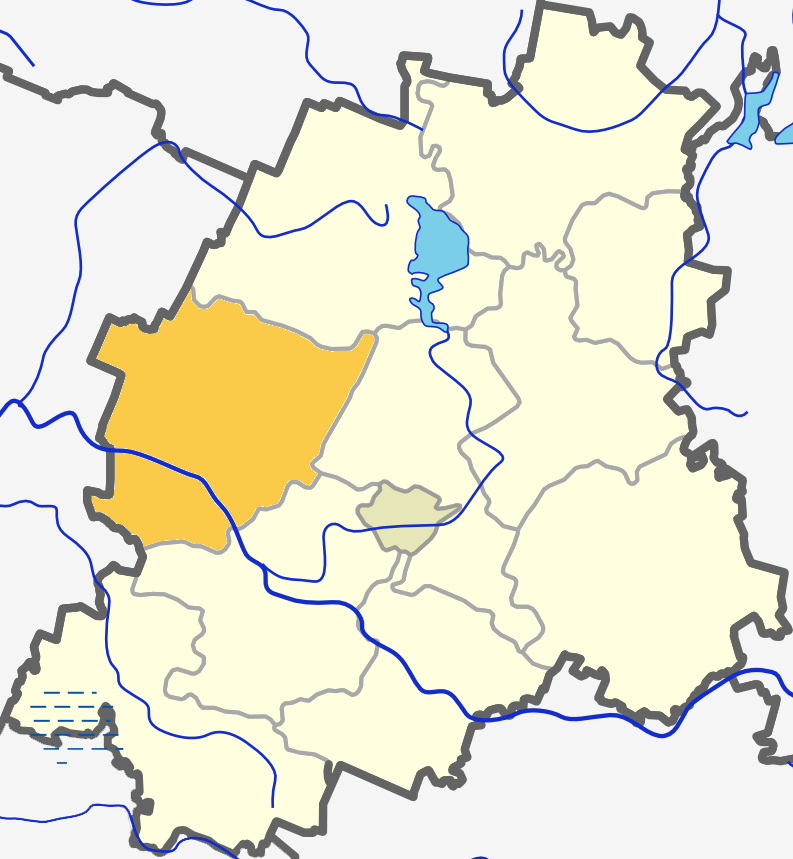
- Location in the Plungė District Municipality

- Location in Lithuania
- Coordinates: 55°57′N 21°40′E
- Country: Lithuania
- County: Telšiai County
- Municipality: Plungė District Municipality
- Seat: Šateikiai

Area
  - Total: 133.6 km^{2} (51.6 sq mi)

Population (2011)
  - Total: 2,233
  - Density: 16.71/km^{2} (43.29/sq mi)
- Time zone: UTC+2 (EET)
  - Summer (DST): UTC+3 (EEST)

Šateikiai eldership (Lithuanian: Šateikių seniūnija) is an eldership in Plungė District Municipality, Lithuania. It lies to the west of the city of Plungė. The administrative center of the eldership is Šateikiai.

== Largest villages ==
- Šateikiai
- Narvaišiai
- Aleksandravas
- Kadaičiai
- Papieviai
- Alksnėnai
- Vydeikiai
- Sėleniai

=== Other villages ===
- Baltmiškiai
- Bučniai
- Bulikai (no inhabitants)
- Burbaičiai
- Dyburiai
- Godeliai
- Liepgiriai
- Mamiai
- Mišėnai
- Pakutuvėnai
- Palūščiai
- Vaitkiai
