= Alsėdžiai =

- Town
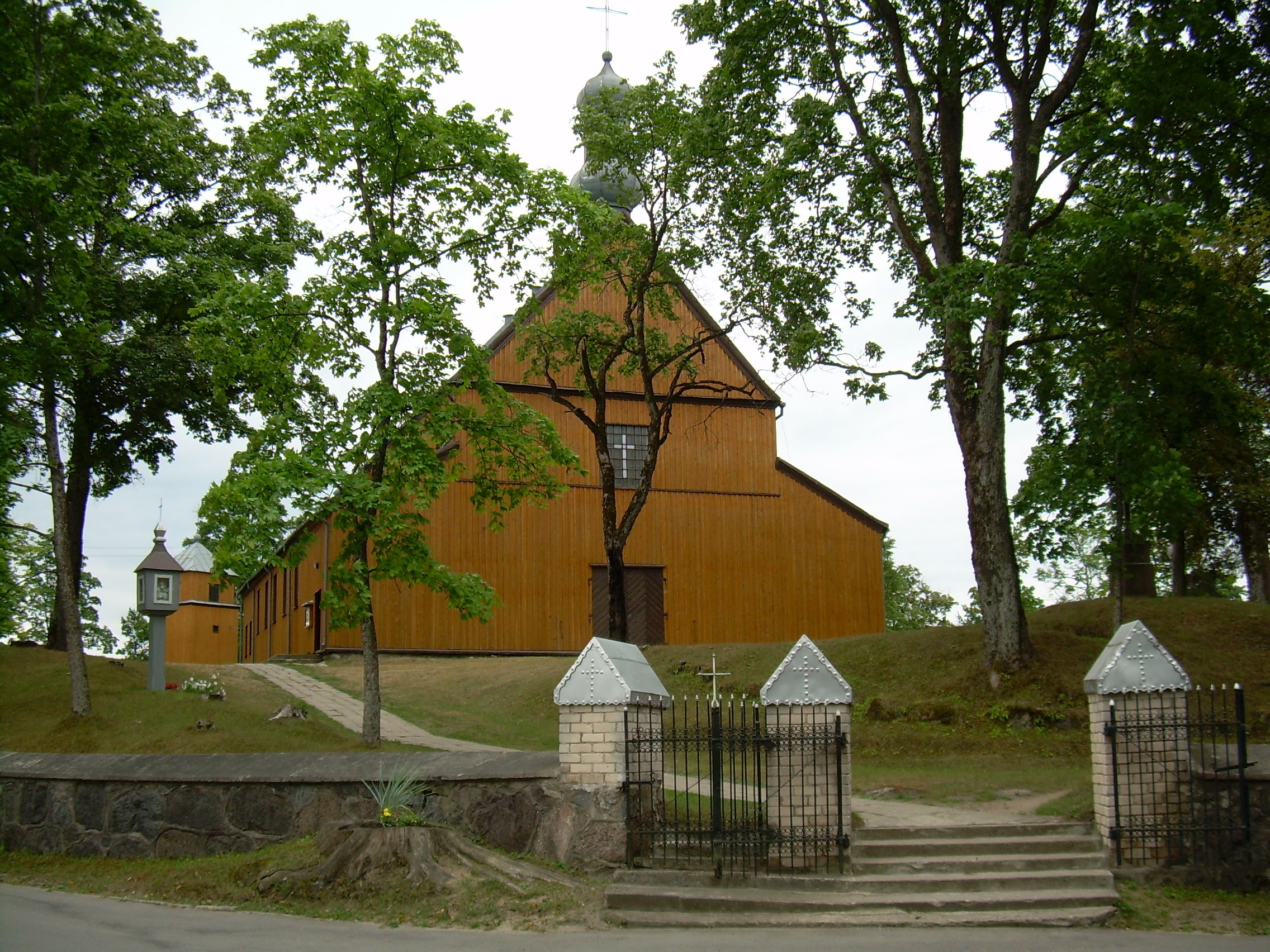
- Alsėdžiai church

- Coat of arms

- Location of Alsėdžiai
- Coordinates: 56°01′40.8″N 22°02′38.4″E
- Country: Lithuania
- County: Telšiai County

Population (2021)
  - Total: 749
- Time zone: UTC+2 (EET)
  - Summer (DST): UTC+3 (EEST)

Alsėdžiai (Samogitian: Alsiedē) is a small town in the Plungė district municipality, in Lithuania. It is near the Sruoja River, 20 km (12 mi) from Plungė.

Alsėdžiai is an administrative center of the Alsėdžiai eldership. Stanisław Narutowicz, one of the signers of Act of Independence of Lithuania and brother to the first president of Poland Gabriel Narutowicz, is buried in the village cemetery.

As of 2011, there were 896 inhabitants in this town.

== History ==
A settlement of Baltic tribes in the territory of the present-day city is said to have existed in the region as early as Mesolithic times.

=== World War II ===
In June 1941, Jews from the town were kept prisoners in a ghetto, some were killed and some were used as labor slaves.

On December 24, 1941, 24-27 Jewish women and one boy were killed in a mass execution perpetrated by an Einsatzgruppen. The murderers selected a place by the foot of the hill by the cemetery so the victims couldn't escape.
