= Gadūnavas Eldership =

Eldership of Lithuania

The Gadūnavas Eldership (Lithuanian: Gadūnavo seniūnija) is an eldership of Lithuania, located in the Telšiai District Municipality. In 2021 its population was 1473.
