= Seda Eldership =

Eldership of Lithuania

The Seda Eldership (Lithuanian: Sedos seniūnija) is an eldership of Lithuania, located in the Mažeikiai District Municipality. In 2021 its population was 2261.
