= Alsėdžiai Eldership =

Alsėdžiai eldership Alsėdžių seniūnija
- Eldership
- Seal

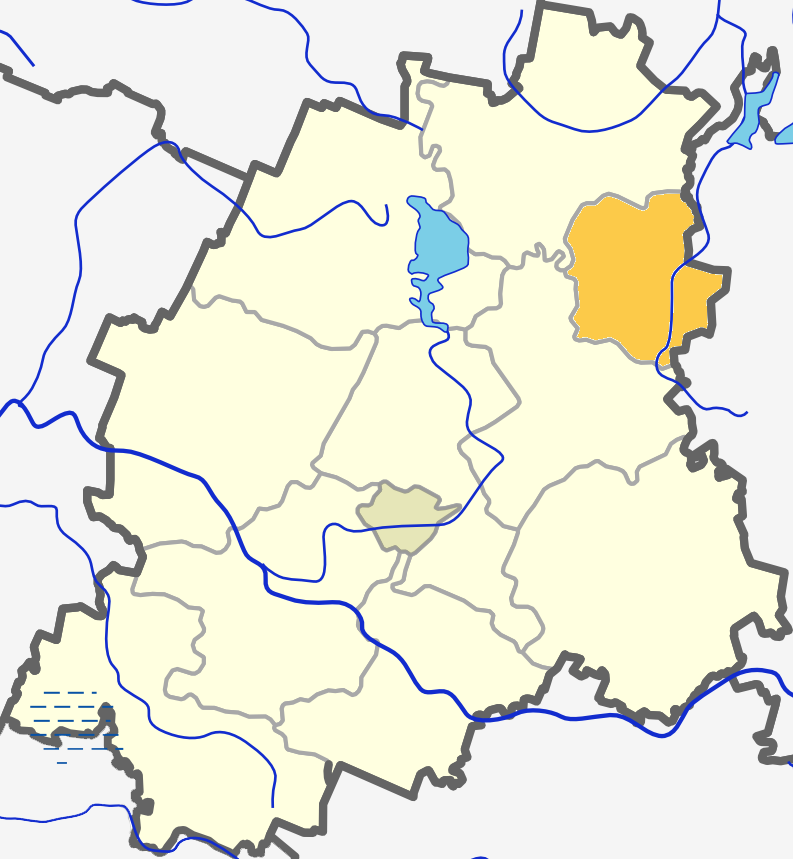
- Location in the Plungė District Municipality

- Location in Lithuania
- Coordinates: 56°2′N 22°2′E
- Country: Lithuania
- County: Telšiai County
- Municipality: Plungė District Municipality
- Seat: Alsėdžiai

Area
  - Total: 49.98 km^{2} (19.30 sq mi)

Population (2011)
  - Total: 1,265
  - Density: 25.31/km^{2} (65.55/sq mi)
- Time zone: UTC+2 (EET)
  - Summer (DST): UTC+3 (EEST)

Alsėdžiai eldership (Alsėdžių seniūnija) is an eldership in Plungė District Municipality, to the northeast of Plungė, in Lithuania. The administrative center is Alsėdžiai.

== Largest towns and villages ==
- Alsėdžiai
- Žvirblaičiai
- Yliai

=== Other villages ===
- Aleksiai
- Dišliai
- Eivydai
- Irkiniai
- Jurgaičiai
- Krapštikiai
- Makščiai
- Peleniai
- Skirpsčiai
- Šoniai
