= Laižuva Eldership =

Eldership of Lithuania

The Laižuva Eldership (Lithuanian: Laižuvos seniūnija) is an eldership of Lithuania, located in the Mažeikiai District Municipality. In 2021 its population was 800.
