= Upyna Eldership (Telšiai) =

Eldership of Lithuania

The Upyna Eldership (Lithuanian: Upynos seniūnija) is an eldership of Lithuania, located in the Telšiai District Municipality. In 2021 its population was 1456.
