= Tryškiai Eldership =

Eldership of Lithuania

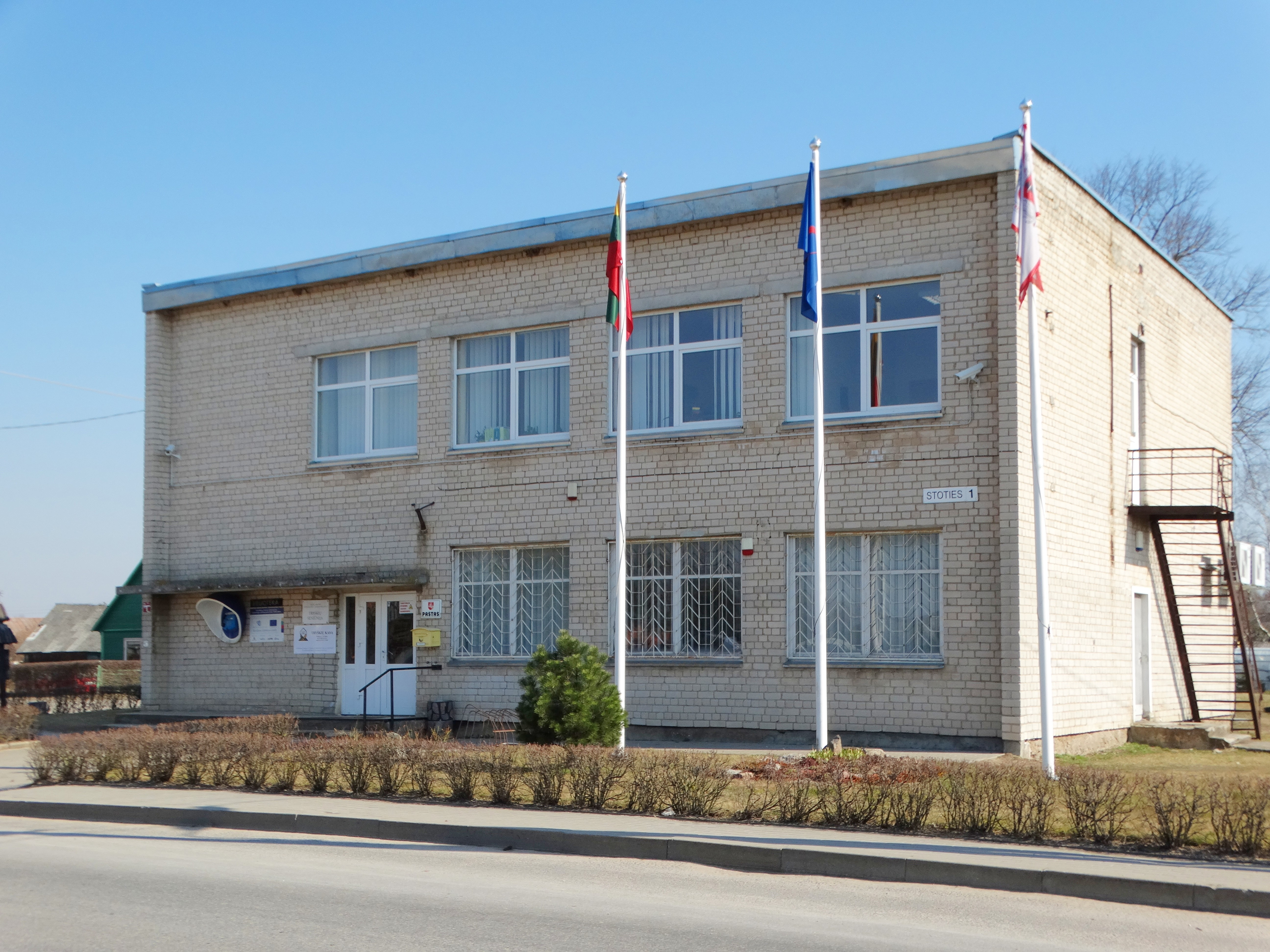
Eldership, Tryškiai, Telšiai district, Lithuania.

The Tryškiai Eldership (Lithuanian: Tryškių seniūnija) is an eldership of Lithuania, located in the Telšiai District Municipality. In 2021 its population was 2154.
