= Viekšniai Eldership =

Eldership of Lithuania

The Viekšniai Eldership (Lithuanian: Viekšnių seniūnija) is an eldership of Lithuania, located in the Mažeikiai District Municipality. In 2021 its population was 4029.
