= Kuliai =

- Town
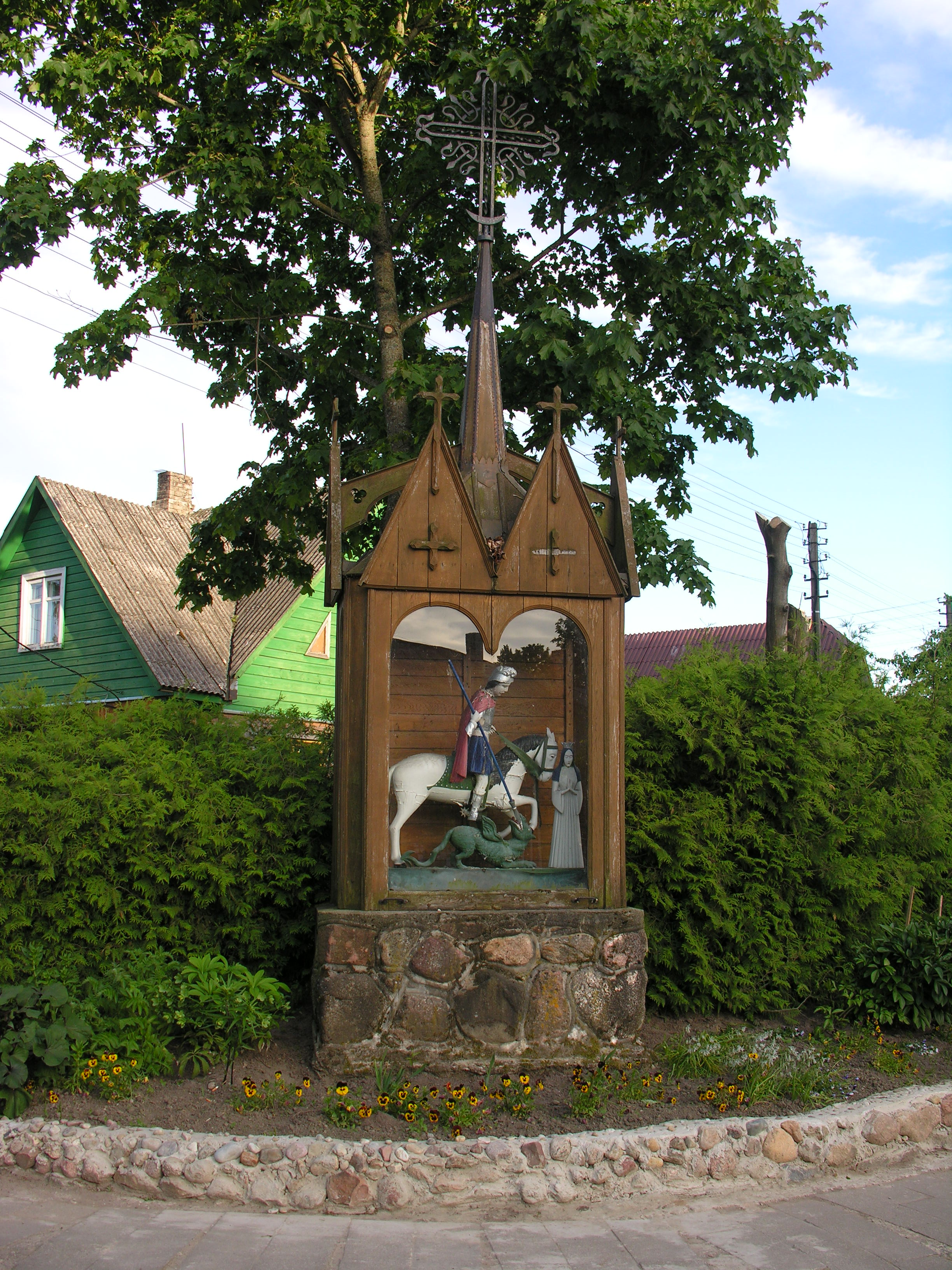

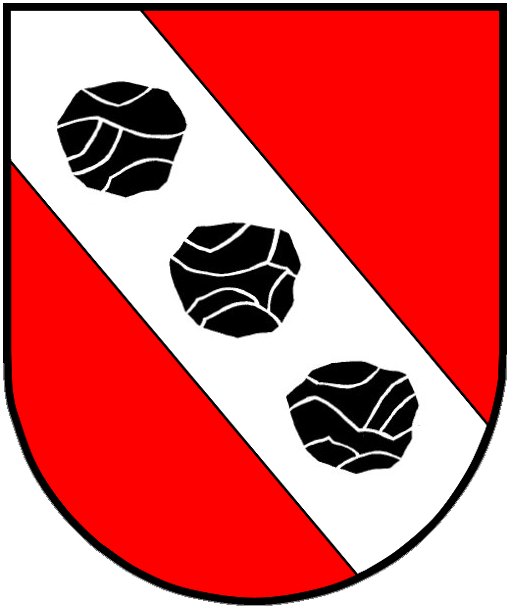
- Coat of arms

- Location within Lithuania
- Coordinates: 55°48′0″N 21°39′11″E
- Country: Lithuania
- County: Telšiai County
- Municipality: Plungė district municipality
- Eldership: Kuliai eldership

Population (2011)
  - Total: 625
- Time zone: UTC+2 (EET)
  - Summer (DST): UTC+3 (EEST)

Kuliai (Samogitian: Kulē, Polish: Kule) is a town in Telšiai County, Lithuania. According to the 2011 census, the town's population was 625.

== History ==
In June 1941, local Lithuanian collaborators arrested the Jewish inhabitants of the town. 85 Jewish individuals were killed in a mass execution.

== Famous people ==
- Yosef Shlomo Kahaneman, a rabbi, was born in the town in 1886
- Nosson Meir Wachtfogel, a rabbi, was born in the town in 1910
