= Babrungas Eldership =

Babrungas eldership Babrungo seniūnija
- Eldership
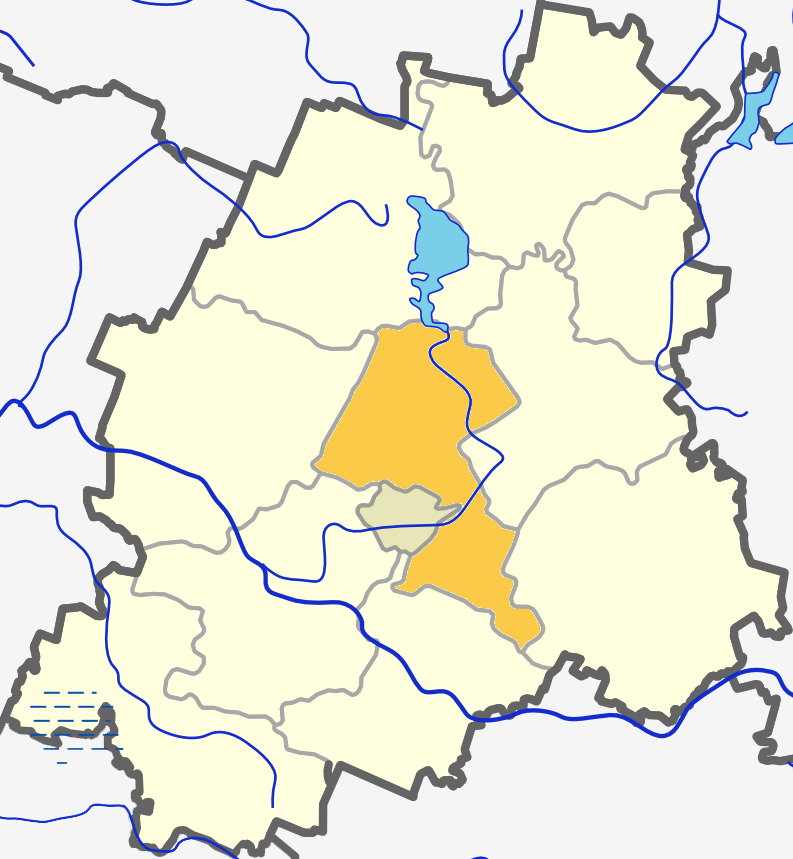
- Location in the Plungė District Municipality

- Location in Lithuania
- Coordinates: 55°57′N 21°52′E
- Country: Lithuania
- County: Telšiai County
- Municipality: Plungė District Municipality
- Seat: Babrungas

Area
  - Total: 100.48 km^{2} (38.80 sq mi)

Population (2011)
  - Total: 2,278
  - Density: 22.67/km^{2} (58.72/sq mi)
- Time zone: UTC+2 (EET)
  - Summer (DST): UTC+3 (EEST)

Babrungas eldership is an eldership in Plungė District Municipality to the northeast from Plungė, Lithuania. The administrative center is Babrungas.

== Main villages ==
- Babrungas
- Glaudžiai
- Jovaišiškė
- Truikiai
- Didvyčiai
- Užlieknis
- Pakerai
- Lieplaukalė

=== Other villages ===
- Babrungėnai
- Bereniai
- Božiai (a part of village)
- Grigaičiai
- Jėrubaičiai
- Jodėnai
- Kalniškiai (a part of village)
- Kaspariškė
- Maceniai (a part of village)
- Merkeliai (a part of village)
- Pauošniai
- Pūčkoriai
- Ruolaičiai
- Surbliai
- Užupiai
- Žvirblaičiai
