= Gandinga =

Village in Lithuania

Coordinates: 55°53′24″N 21°45′57″E

Gandinga is a village in Plungė District Municipality, Lithuania.

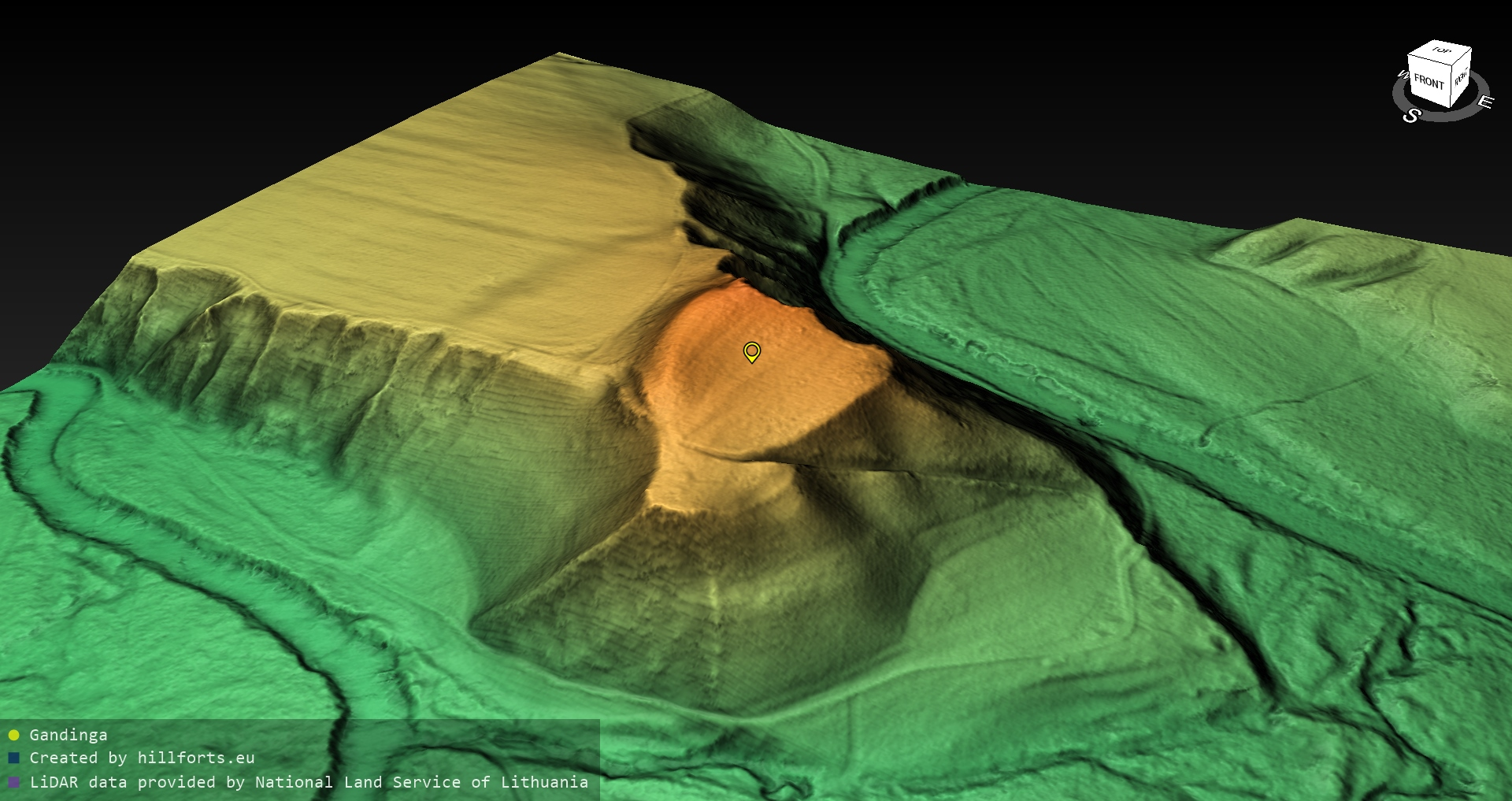
A 3D model of the Gandinga hillfort

The Gandinga hillfort archaeological site within the Gandinga Landscape Reserve by the Babrungas River valley is by the village.
