= Gintališkė =

Coordinates: 56°02′55″N 21°43′30″E

Gintališkė is a village in Plungė District Municipality, Lithuania, on the Plateliai - Salantai road, 6 km west of Plateliai . It is the seat of the sub-eldership (seniūnaitija).

The Salantas river flows through the village. The Gintališkės hillfort is at the confluenve of Salantas and Kūlupis near the village.

== History ==
Within the Russian Empire, it was a small town in the Kovno Governorate, Telshevsky uezd.
