= Diegliai oil field =

Oil field in the Gargždai Oil Block, Lithuania

- Country: Lithuania
- Location: Stonaičiai, Šilutė District Municipality
- Block: Gargždai Oil Block
- Offshore/onshore: onshore
- Coordinates: 55°32′23″N 21°29′18″E
- Operator: Minijos nafta

Field history
- Discovery: 1972
- Start of production: 1999

Production
- Estimated oil in place: 1.13 million tonnes (~ 1.32×10^{6} m^{3} or 8.28 million bbl)

The Diegliai oil field is an oil field located in the Gargždai Oil Block, Šilutė District Municipality, Lithuania.

== History ==
Diegliai oil field was discovered in 1972, but production only started in 1999.

Lithuanian government sold the license of Gargždai Oil Block to the Lithuanian-Danish company Minijos nafta that currently operates the field.

== See also ==
- List of oil fields
