= Gandinga hillfort =

Hillfort in Lithuania

Coordinates: 55°53′13″N 21°46′18″E

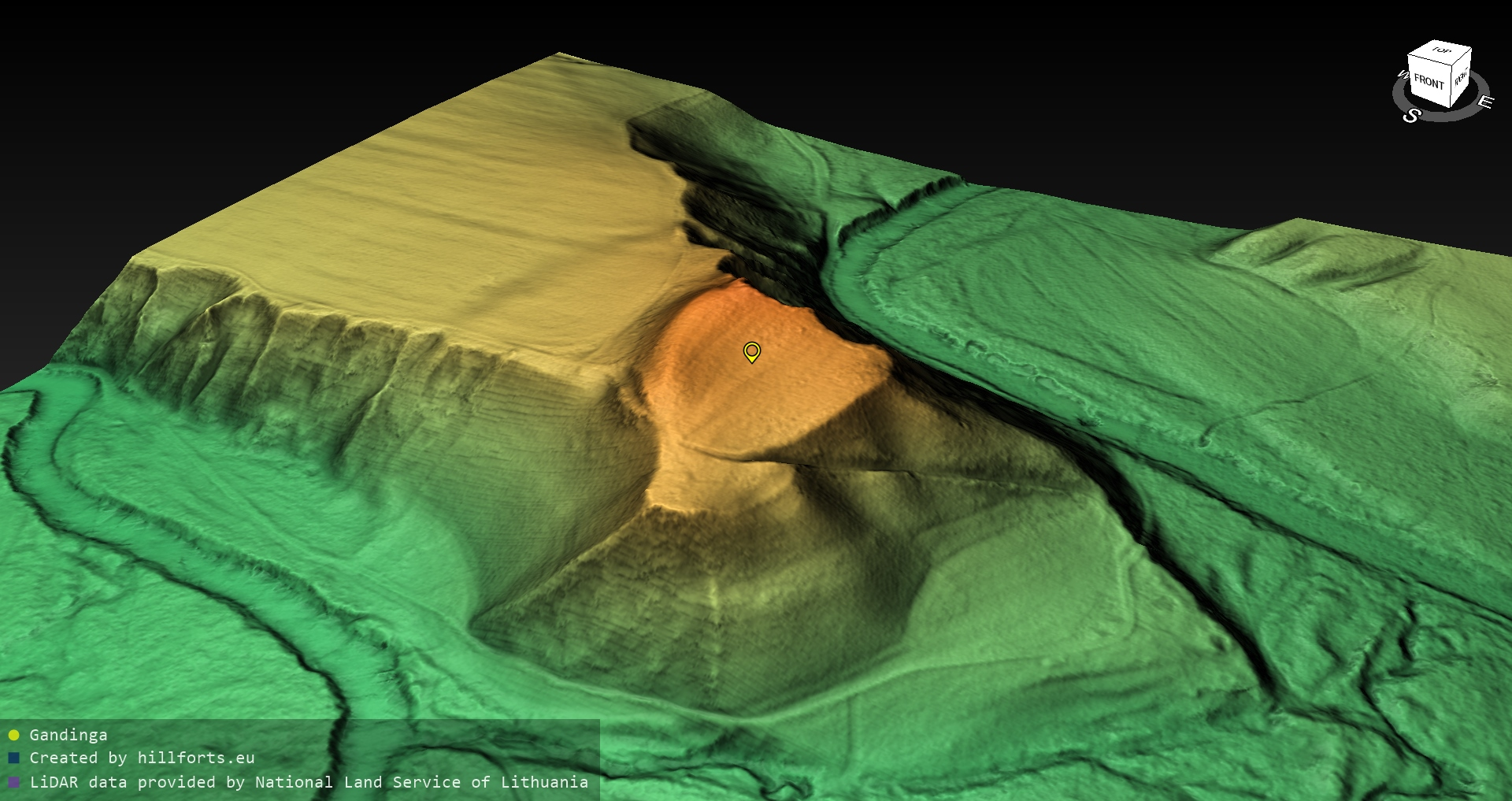
A 3D model of the hillfort

The Gandinga hillfort (Lithuanian: Gandingos piliakalnis) is an archaeological site, a hillfort, a hillside settlement, and a burial ground, by the Gandinga village, Lithuania, on the right bank of the Babrungas River within the Gandinga Landscape Reserve.

The hillfort was a wooden fortification to defend Samogitian lands. The access to the hilfort was only from the west, the other sides being surrounded by Babrungas, which created an elevated peninsula here.

The site (the hillfort, the chapel and the settlement) has a protected status of national significance since 1997.
