= Lithuanian National Symphony Orchestra =

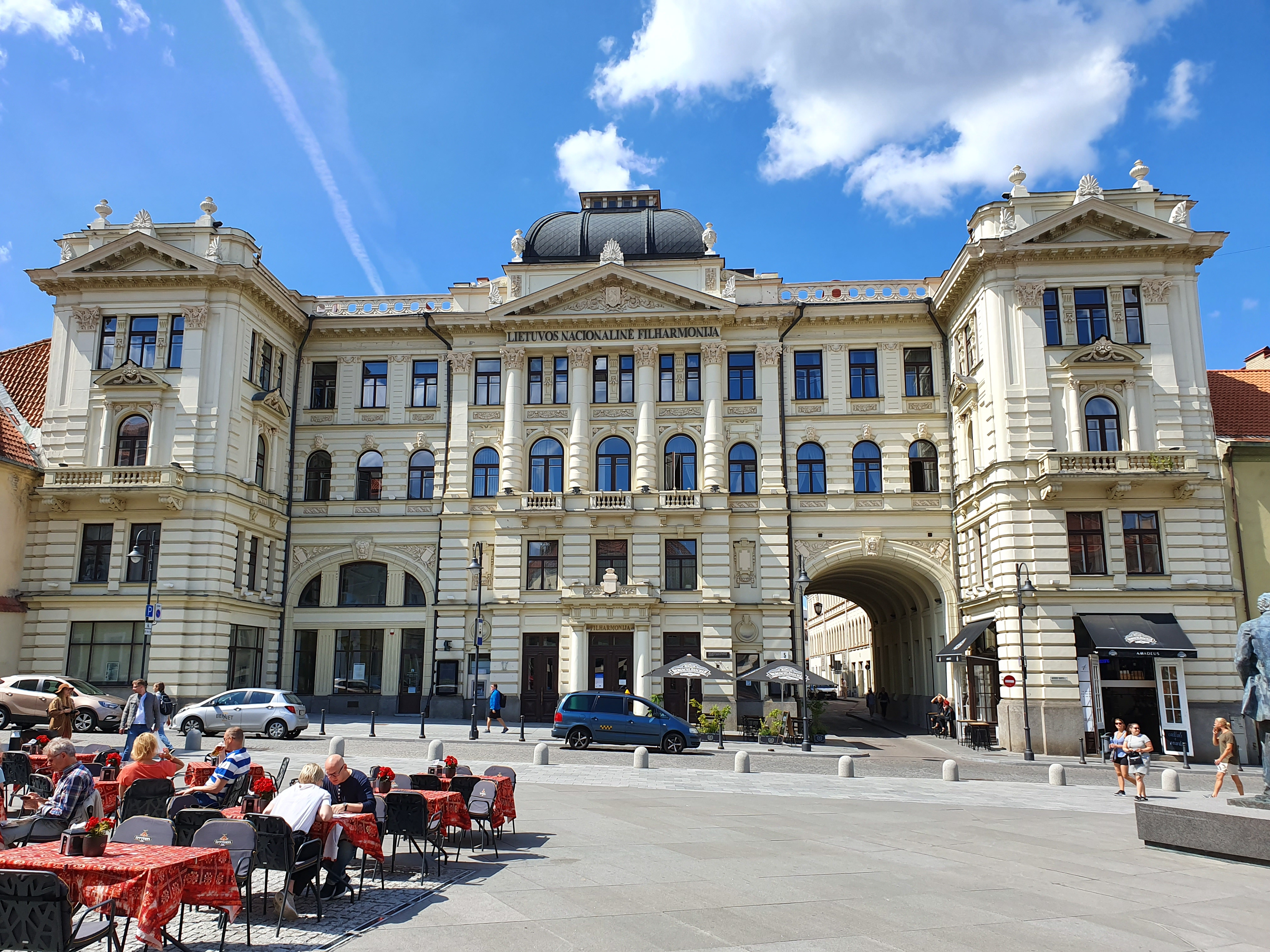
Headquarters of the Lithuanian National Philharmonic Society

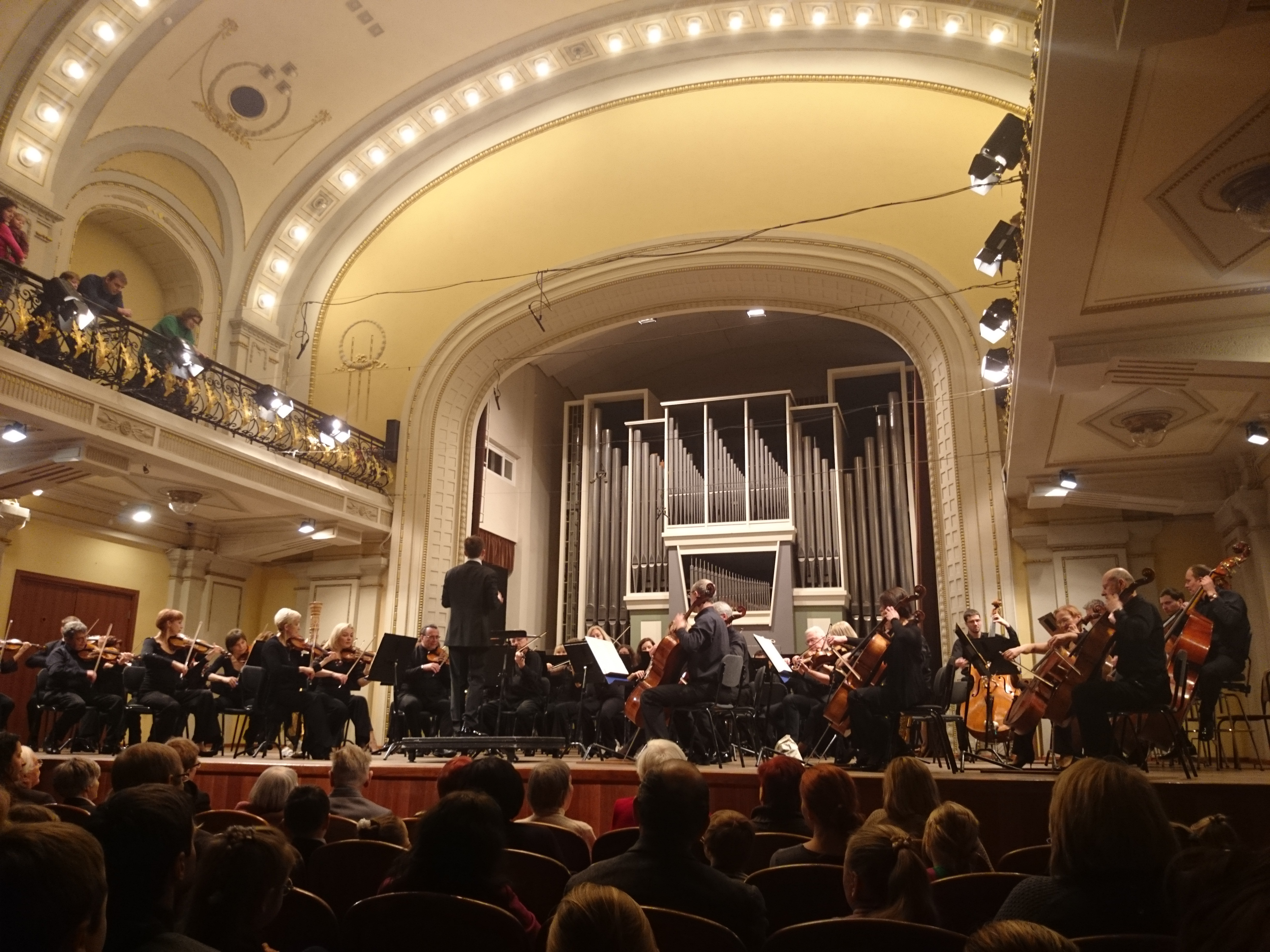
Orchestra by Lietuvos filharmonija

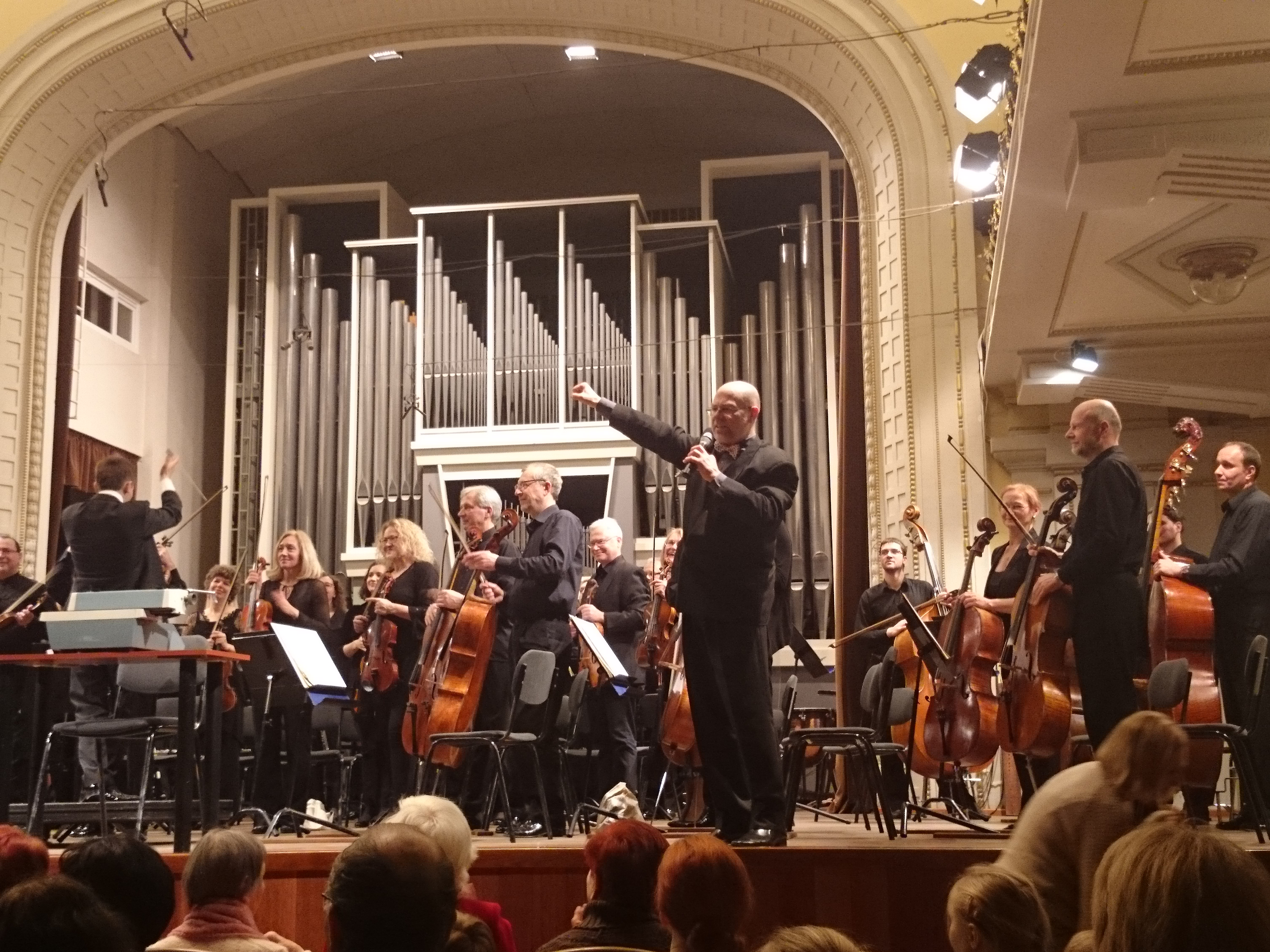
Concert director Viktoras Gerulaitis, 2015

The Lithuanian National Symphony Orchestra (LNSO; Lietuvos nacionalinis simfoninis orkestras) is one of Lithuania's two national orchestras, and was founded in 1940. Melodiya records with Lithuanian conductors and Lithuanian music released during the Soviet era indicate on label and sleeve the LTSR Valstybinis filharmonijos simfoninis orkestras which seems to have been the official name of the orchestra in Soviet times.

The younger Lithuanian State Symphony Orchestra (LVSO) was founded in 1988.

== Conductors ==
- Balys Dvarionas – 1940–1941, 1958–1964
- Abelis Klenickis – 1944–1945, 1958-1963
- Margarita Dvarionaitė – 1961–1993
- Juozas Domarkas – 1964
- Robertas Šervenikas – 2000
- Modestas Pitrėnas – 2004

== See also ==
Lithuanian National Philharmonic Society
