= Stonaičiai =

Village in Lithuania

- Stonaičiai
- Location of Stonaičiai
- Coordinates: 55°32′6″N 21°29′9.6″E
- Country: Lithuania
- Ethnographic region: Lithuania Minor
- County: Klaipėda County
- Municipality: Šilutė district municipality
- Eldership: Saugos eldership

Population (2021)
  - Total: 4
- Time zone: UTC+2 (EET)
  - Summer (DST): UTC+3 (EEST)
- Climate: Dfb

Stonaičiai is a village in the south of the Klaipėda County in western Lithuania. The village was part of the Klaipėda Region and ethnographic Lithuania Minor.

== History ==
In 1972, the nearby Diegliai oil field was discovered, though production only started in 1999.

== Demography ==
=== Historical population ===
Historical population

Year	Pop.	±% p.a.
1871	78	—
1885	102	+1.93%
1910	145	+1.42%
1959	81	−1.18%
1970	54	−3.62%

Year	Pop.	±% p.a.
1979	45	−2.01%
1989	15	−10.40%
2001	6	−7.35%
2011	10	+5.24%
2021	4	−8.76%

Source: 1902, 1923, 1959 & 1970, 1979, 1989, 2001, 2011
