= Mažeikiai District Municipality =

Coordinates: 56°15′54″N 22°16′48″E

Mažeikiai District Municipality Mažeikių rajono savivaldybė
- Municipality
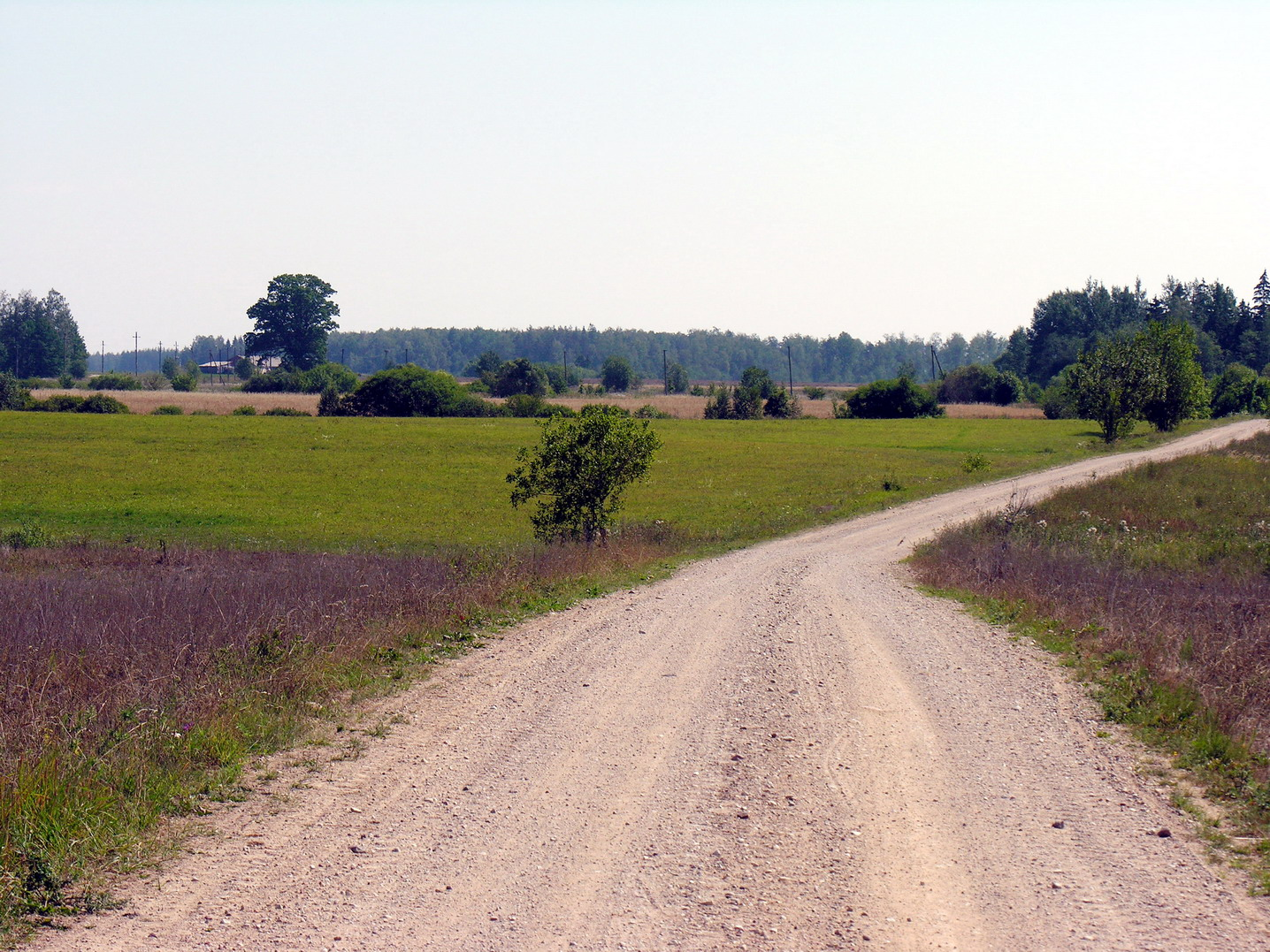
- Landscape near Marškonė

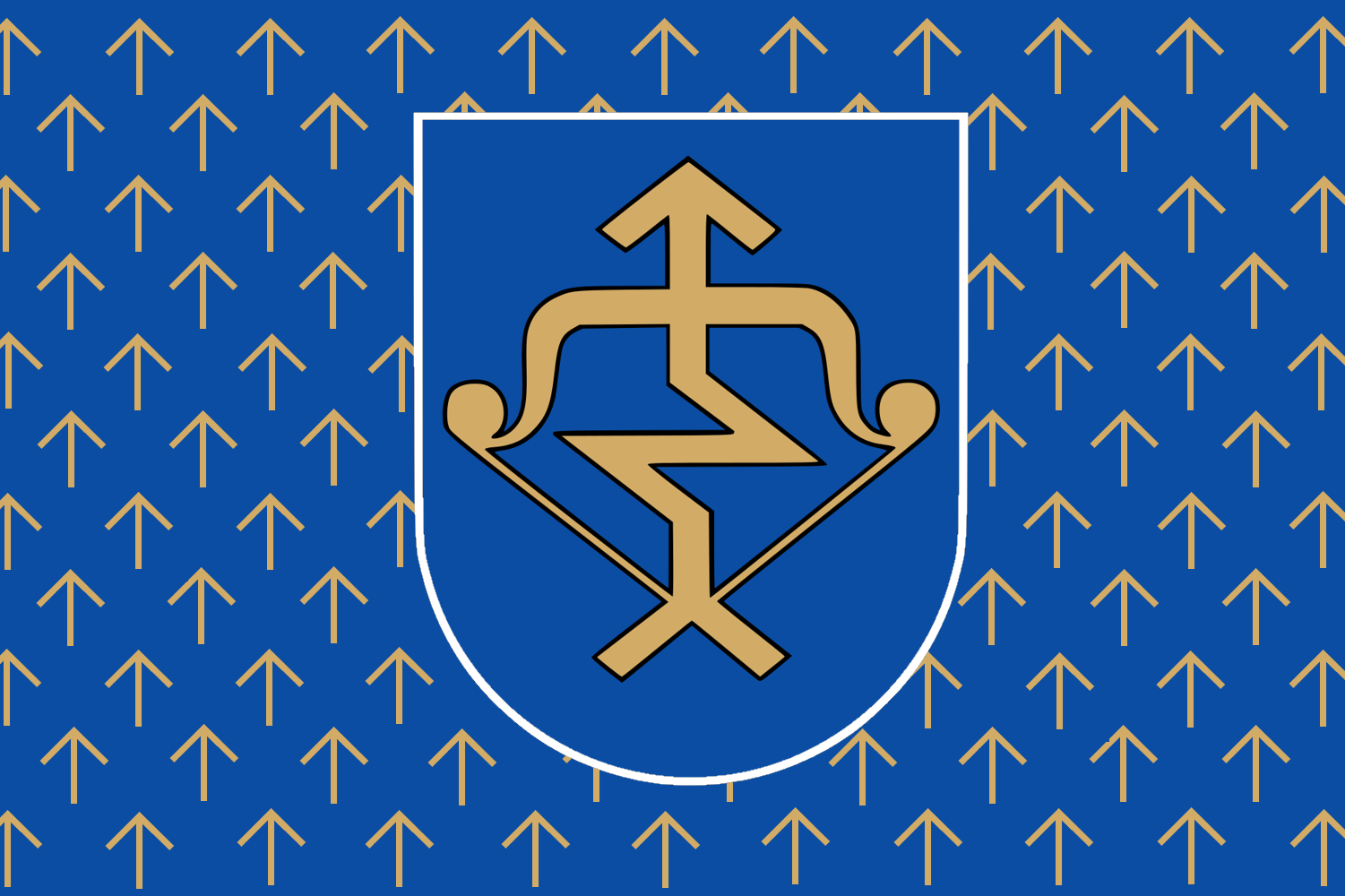
- Flag Coat of arms

- Location of Mažeikiai district municipality within Lithuania

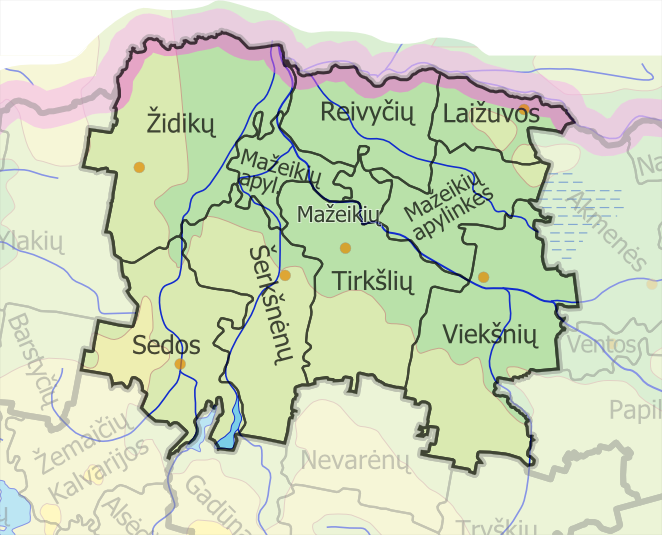
- Map of elderships of the Mažeikiai district municipality
- Country: Lithuania
- Ethnographic region: Samogitia
- County: Telšiai County
- Capital: Mažeikiai
- Elderships: 9

Area
  - Total: 1,220 km^{2} (470 sq mi)
  - Rank: 30th

Population (2021)
  - Total: 52,120
  - Rank: 10th
  - Density: 42.7/km^{2} (111/sq mi)
  - Rank: 12th
- Time zone: UTC+2 (EET)
  - Summer (DST): UTC+3 (EEST)
- Postal code: LT-89100
- Telephone code: 443
- Major settlements: Mažeikiai (pop. 32,470); Viekšniai (pop. 2,219); Seda (pop. 898)
- Website: www.mazeikiai.lt

Mažeikiai District Municipality (Lithuanian: Mažeikių rajono savivaldybė, Samogitian: Mažėikiu rajuona savivaldībė) is located in the north-west of Lithuania, on the River Venta in Telšiai County. The administrative center of Mažeikiai District is the city of Mažeikiai. Its territory of 1,220.2 km^{2} (471.1 sq mi) is composed of 32 km^{2} (12 sq mi) of towns and settlements, 22 km^{2} (8.5 sq mi) of industrial enterprises and roads, 614 km^{2} (237 sq mi) of agricultural lands, 273 km^{2} (105 sq mi) of forests, and 68 km^{2} (26 sq mi) of tracts of other designation. There is one urban and 8 rural elderates. In 2003, the population was 67,393. Of this number, 46,223 live in towns and 21,170 in villages.

It is situated in northern Samogitia. Mažeikiai District borders with the Republic of Latvia in the north, with Akmenė District Municipality in the east, with Telšiai District Municipality in the southeast, with Plungė District Municipality in the southwest and with Skuodas District Municipality in the west. Mažeikiai District stretches for 43.5 km (27.0 mi) east-to-west and 38 km (24 mi) north-to-south. Petraičiai village is the westernmost settlement, with Kalniškiai and Pakliaupė villages being the easternmost settlements. The northernmost is Giniočiai, while the southernmost is Pasruojė.

== Gallery ==
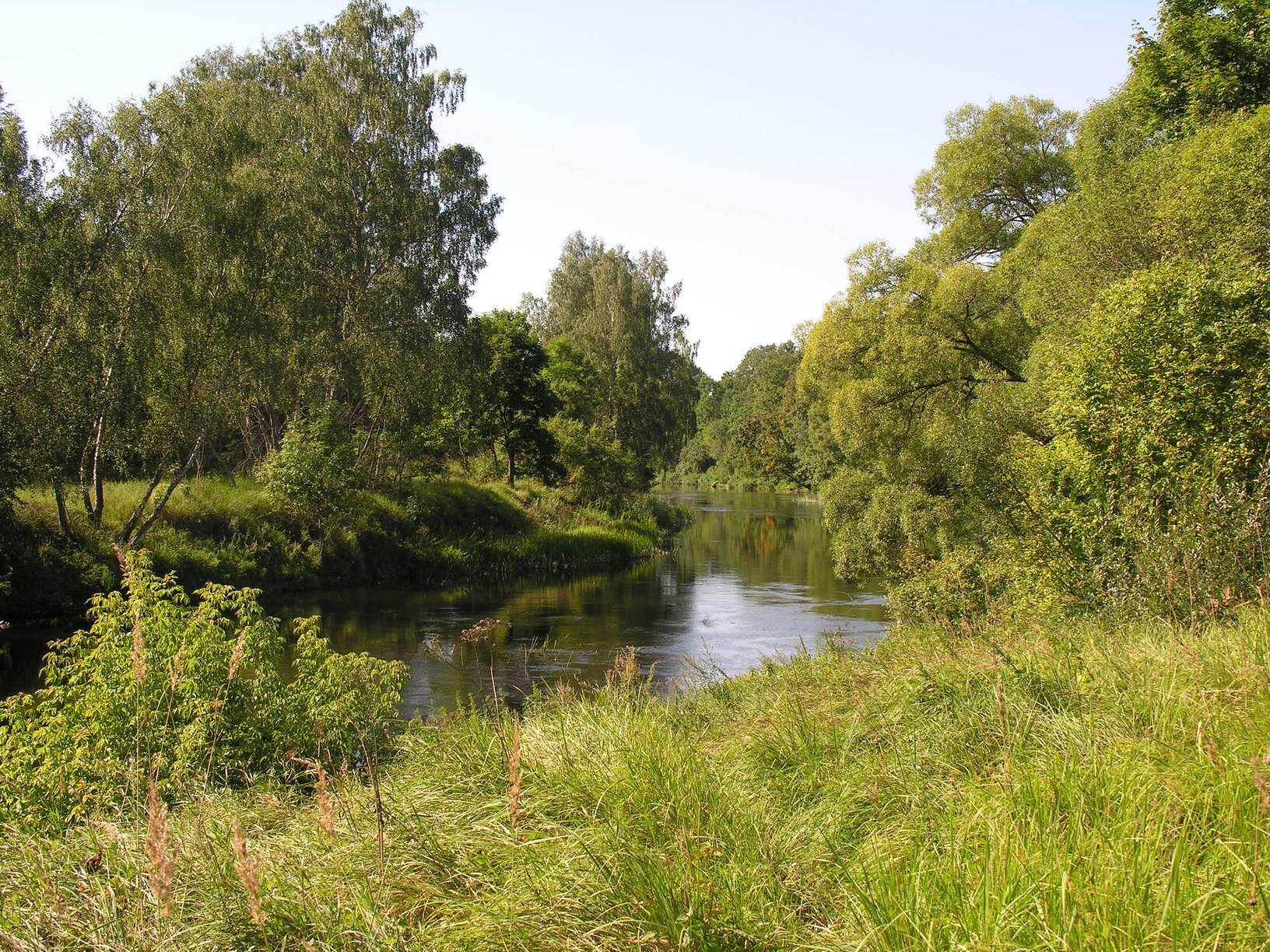
The River Venta in Mažeikiai district

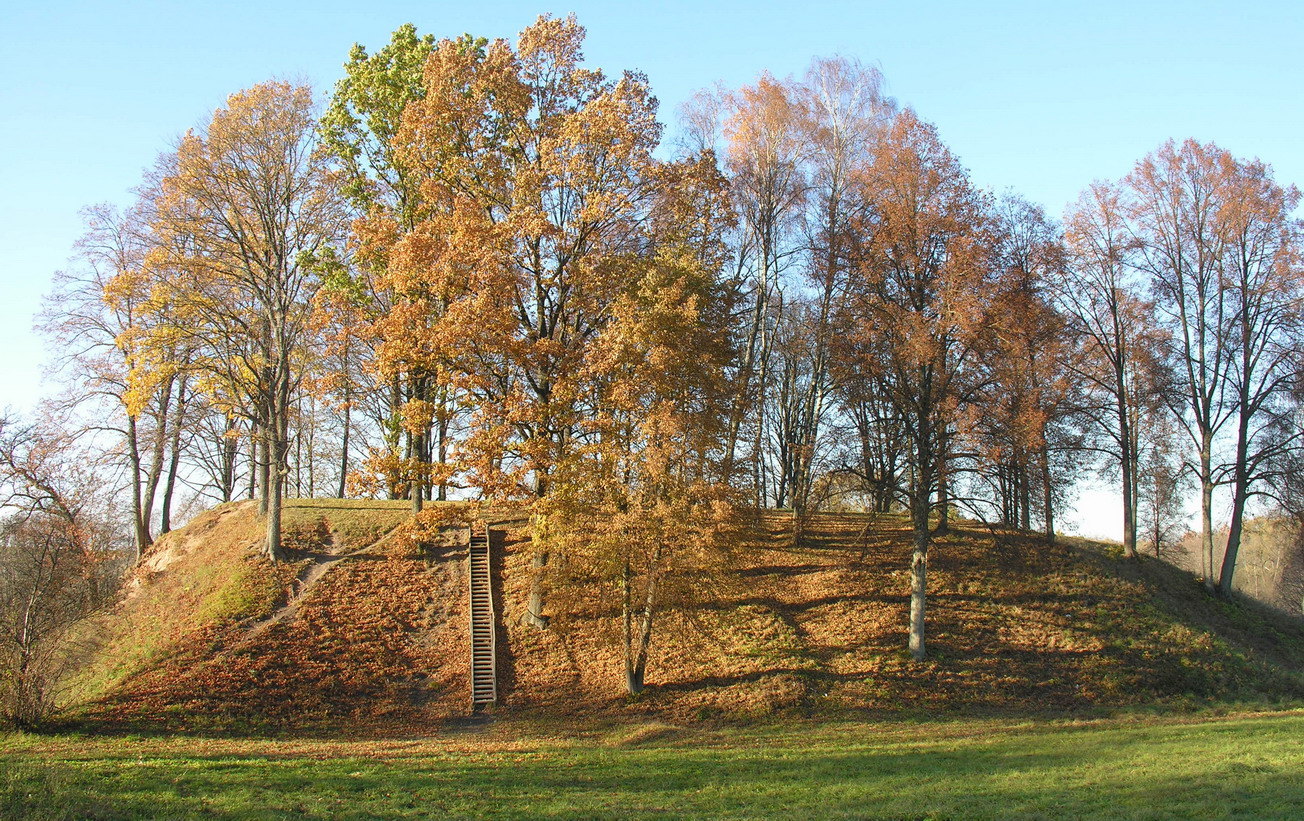
Daubariai hillfort located in Mažeikiai District Municipality, Lithuania. Protected by the state.
