= Telšiai District Municipality =

Telšiai District Municipality Telšių rajono savivaldybė
- Municipality
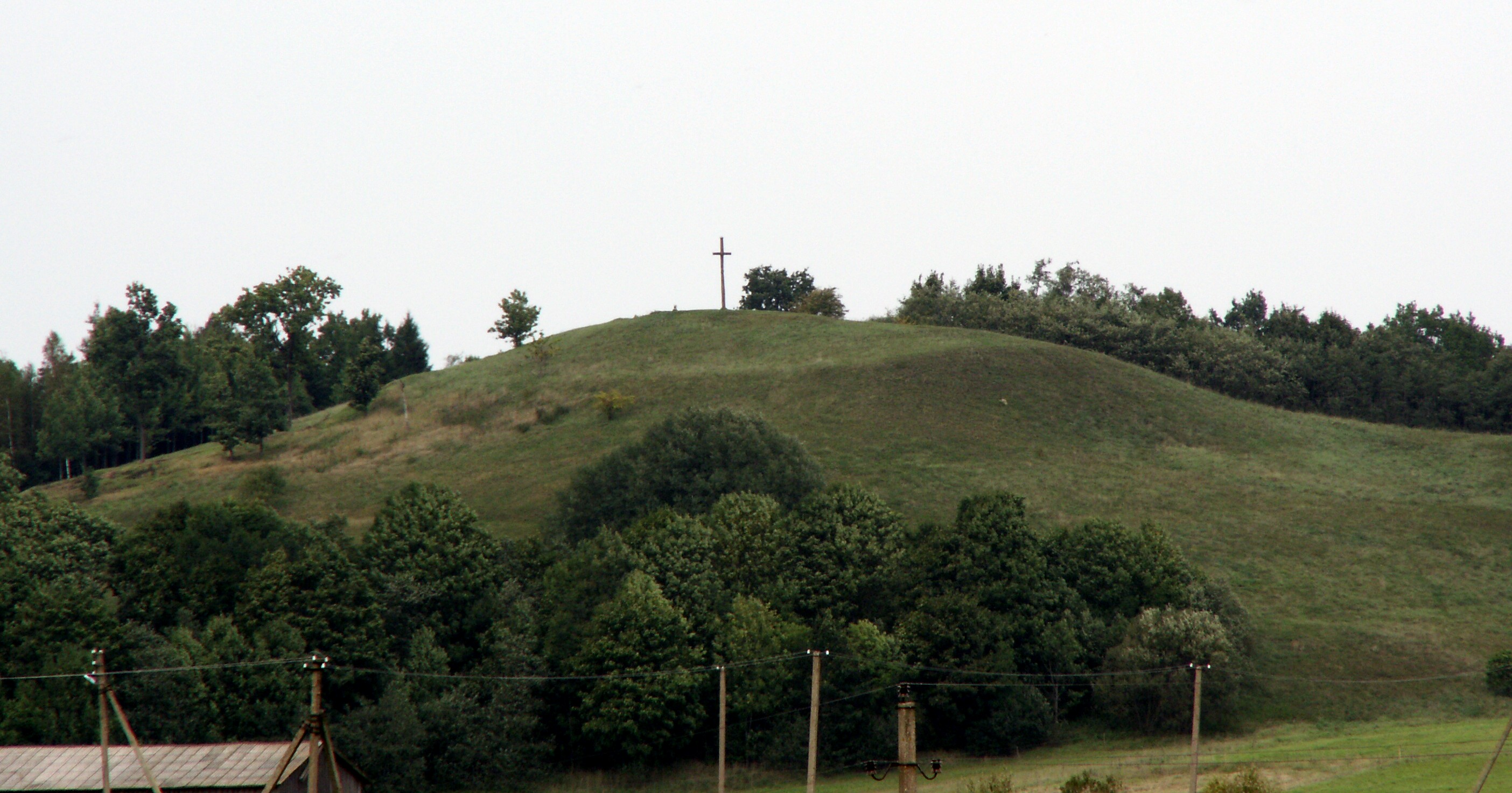
- Burbiškiai mound

- Coat of arms

- Location of Telšiai district municipality within Lithuania

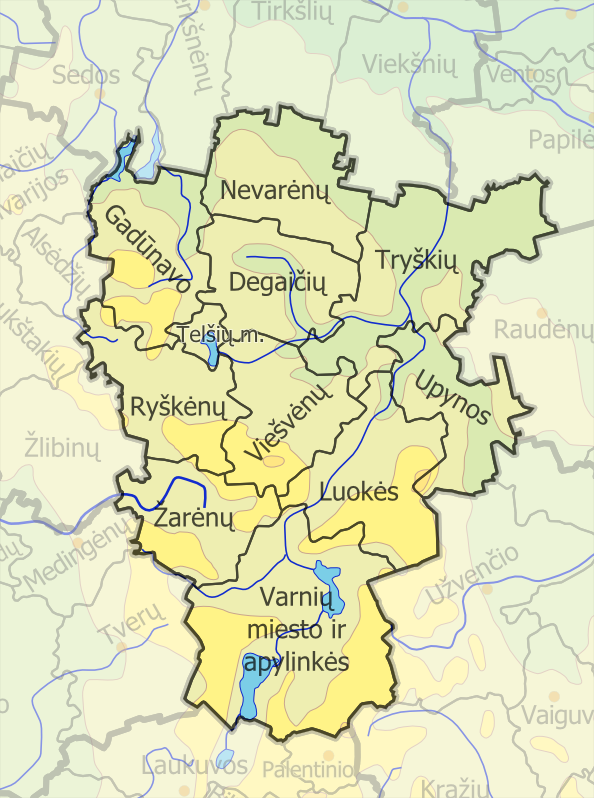
- Map of Telšiai district municipality
- Coordinates: 55°53′17″N 22°23′38″E
- Country: Lithuania
- Ethnographic region: Samogitia
- County: Telšiai County
- Capital: Telšiai
- Elderships: 11

Area
  - Total: 1,439 km^{2} (556 sq mi)
  - Rank: 18-19th

Population (2021)
  - Total: 40,210
  - Rank: 12th
  - Density: 27.94/km^{2} (72.37/sq mi)
  - Rank: 20th
- Time zone: UTC+2 (EET)
  - Summer (DST): UTC+3 (EEST)
- Telephone code: 444
- Major settlements: Telšiai (pop. 21,294); Tryškiai (pop. 1,060); Varniai (pop. 873)
- Website: www.telsiai.lt

Telšiai District Municipality (Lithuanian: Telšių rajono savivaldybė, Samogitian: Telšiū rajuona savivaldībė) is one of 60 municipalities in Lithuania, containing the city of Telšiai.
