= Plungė District Municipality =

Coordinates: 55°56′20″N 21°53′10″E

Plungė District Municipality Plungės rajono savivaldybė
- Municipality
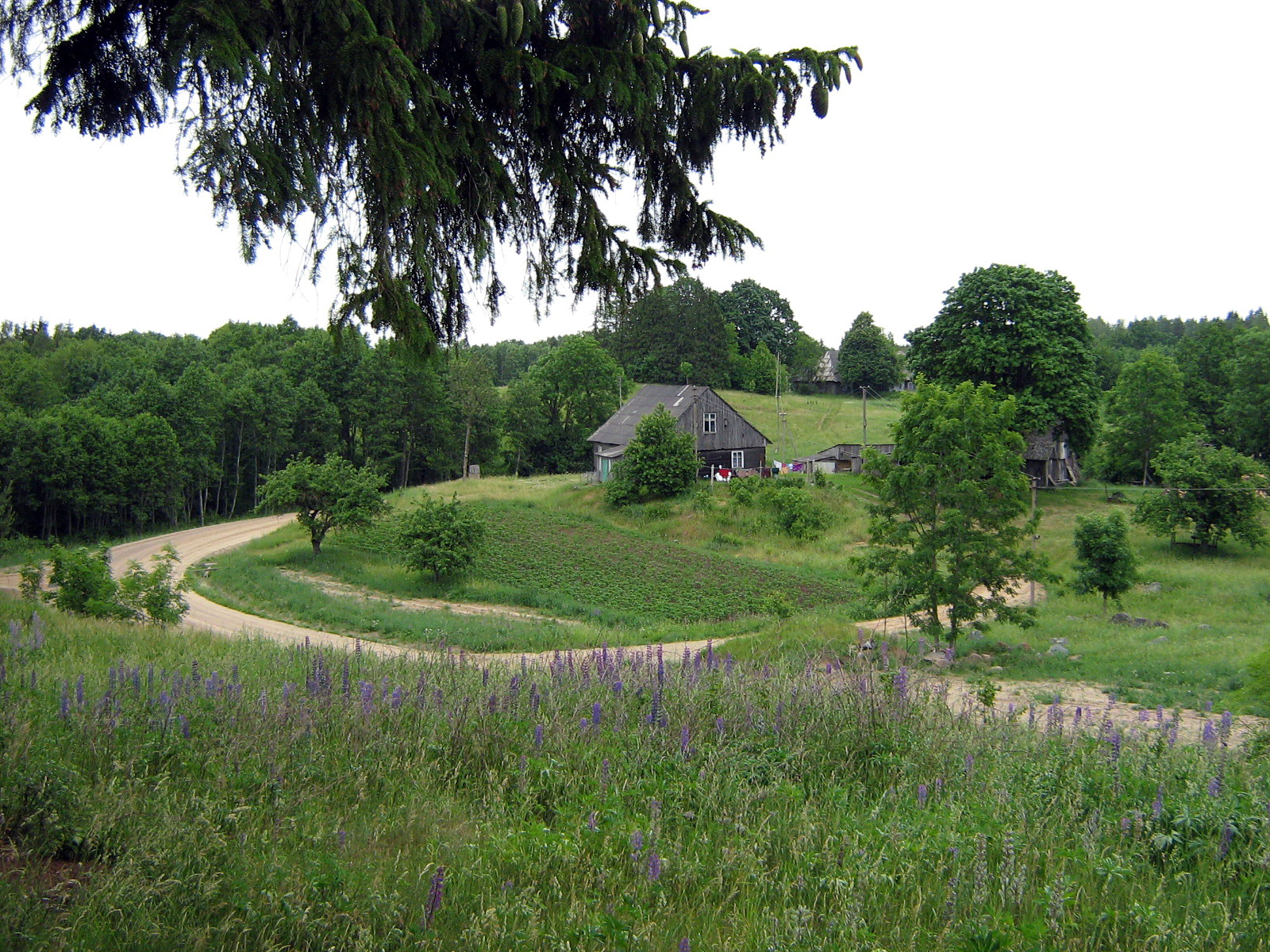
- Landscape near Mikytai

- Flag Coat of arms

- Location of Plungė district municipality within Lithuania

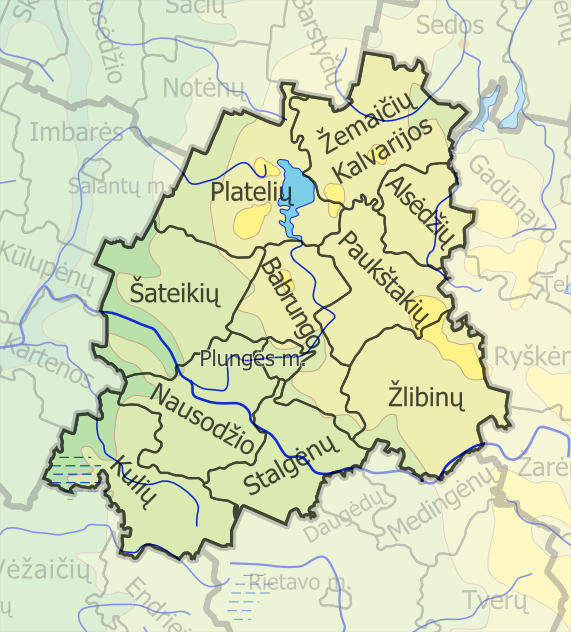
- Map of Plungė district municipality
- Country: Lithuania
- Ethnographic region: Samogitia
- County: Telšiai County
- Capital: Plungė
- Elderships: 11

Area
  - Total: 1,105 km^{2} (427 sq mi)
  - Rank: 35th

Population (2021)
  - Total: 33,665
  - Rank: 23-24th
  - Density: 30.47/km^{2} (78.91/sq mi)
  - Rank: 21st
- Time zone: UTC+2 (EET)
  - Summer (DST): UTC+3 (EEST)
- Telephone code: 448
- Major settlements: Plungė (pop. 17,252); Varkaliai (pop. 1,024)
- Website: www.plunge.lt

Plungė District Municipality (Lithuanian: Plungės rajono savivaldybė, Samogitian: Plongės rajuona savivaldībė) is one of 60 municipalities in Lithuania.

== Tourism and pilgrimage ==
Major tourist attractions are Lake Plateliai and the nearby town of Plateliai. All year round and especially in summer, this municipality attracts many pilgrims from all over the world to its annual Christian celebrations in Žemaičių Kalvarija.

== Municipality council ==
Plungė District Municipality Council is the governing body of the Plungė District Municipality. it is responsible for municipality laws. The council is composed of 25 member elected for four-year terms.

The council is a member of the Association of Local Authorities in Lithuania.

=== Mayors ===
- 1995 – Antanas Lapukas
- 1997 – Aleksandras Lukas
- 2000 – Vytautas Jonutis
- 2003 – Vigantas Danilavičius
- 2004 – Algirdas Pečiulis
- 2007 – Elvyra Valerija Lapukienė

== Elderships ==
There are 11 elderships in Plungė District Municipality:

- Alsėdžiai eldership
- Babrungas eldership
- Kuliai eldership
- Nausodis eldership
- Paukštakiai eldership
- Plateliai eldership
- Plungė City eldership
- Stalgėnai eldership
- Šateikiai eldership
- Žemaičių Kalvarija eldership
- Žlibinai eldership
