= Telšiai County =

County of Lithuania

Coordinates: 55°59′18″N 22°14′35″E

Telšiai County Telšių apskritis
- County
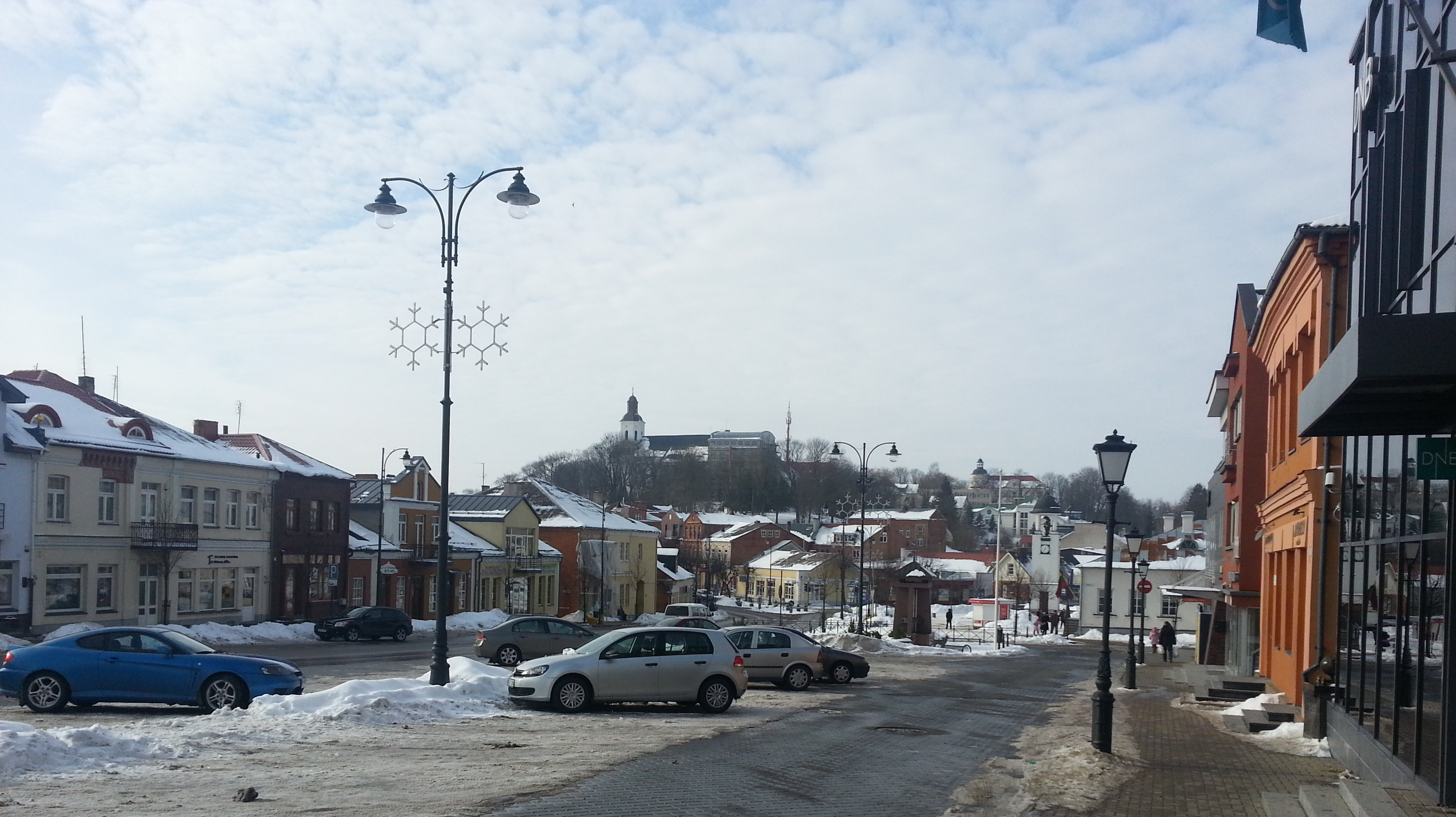
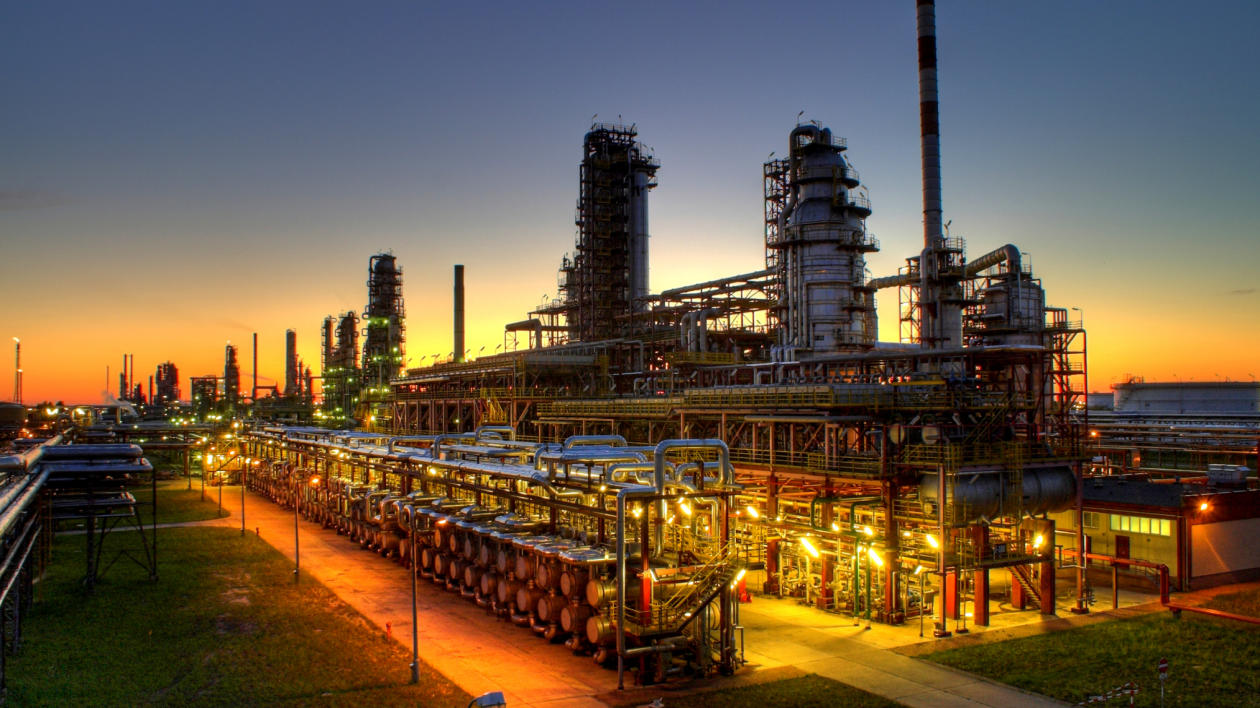
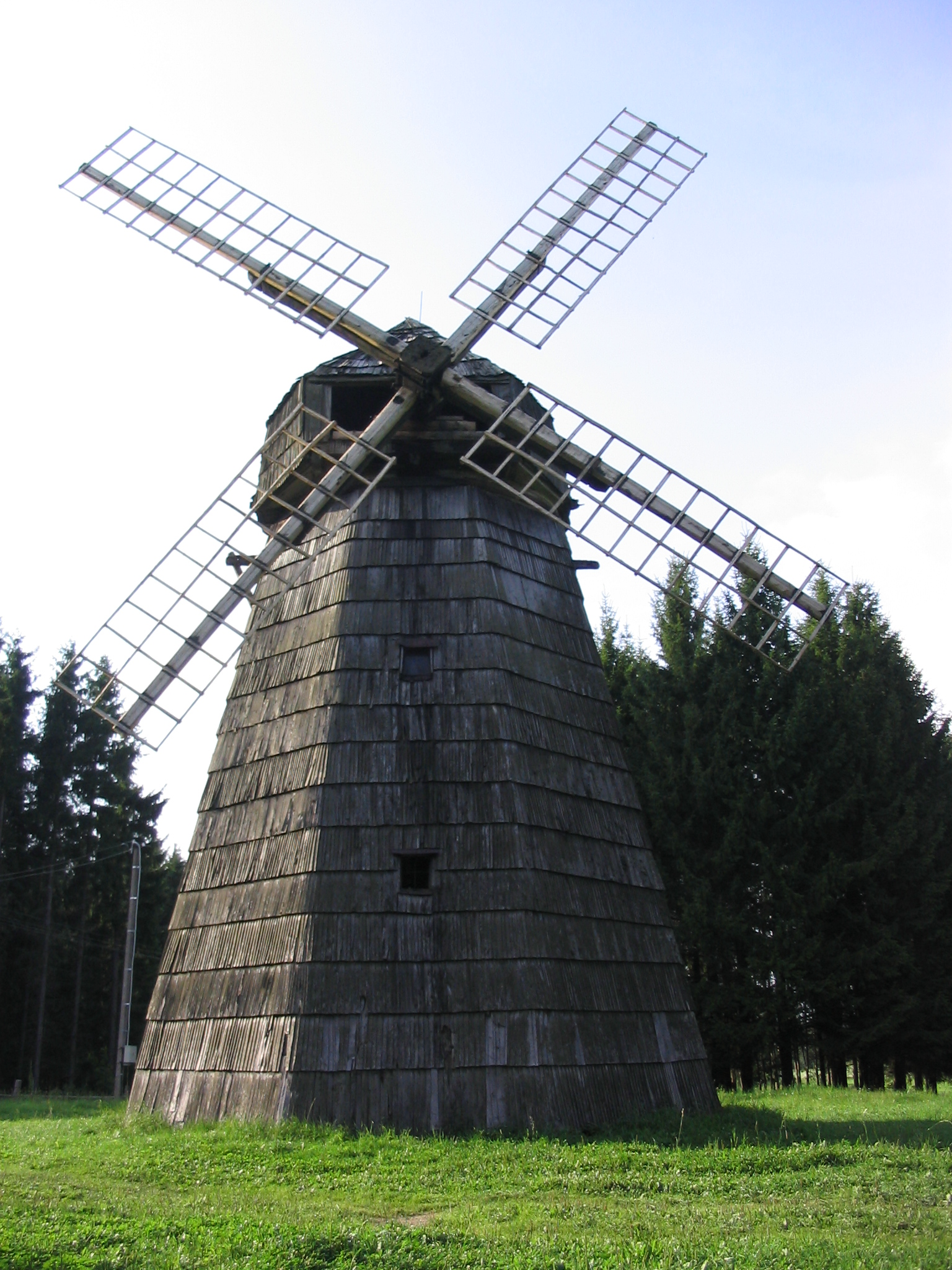
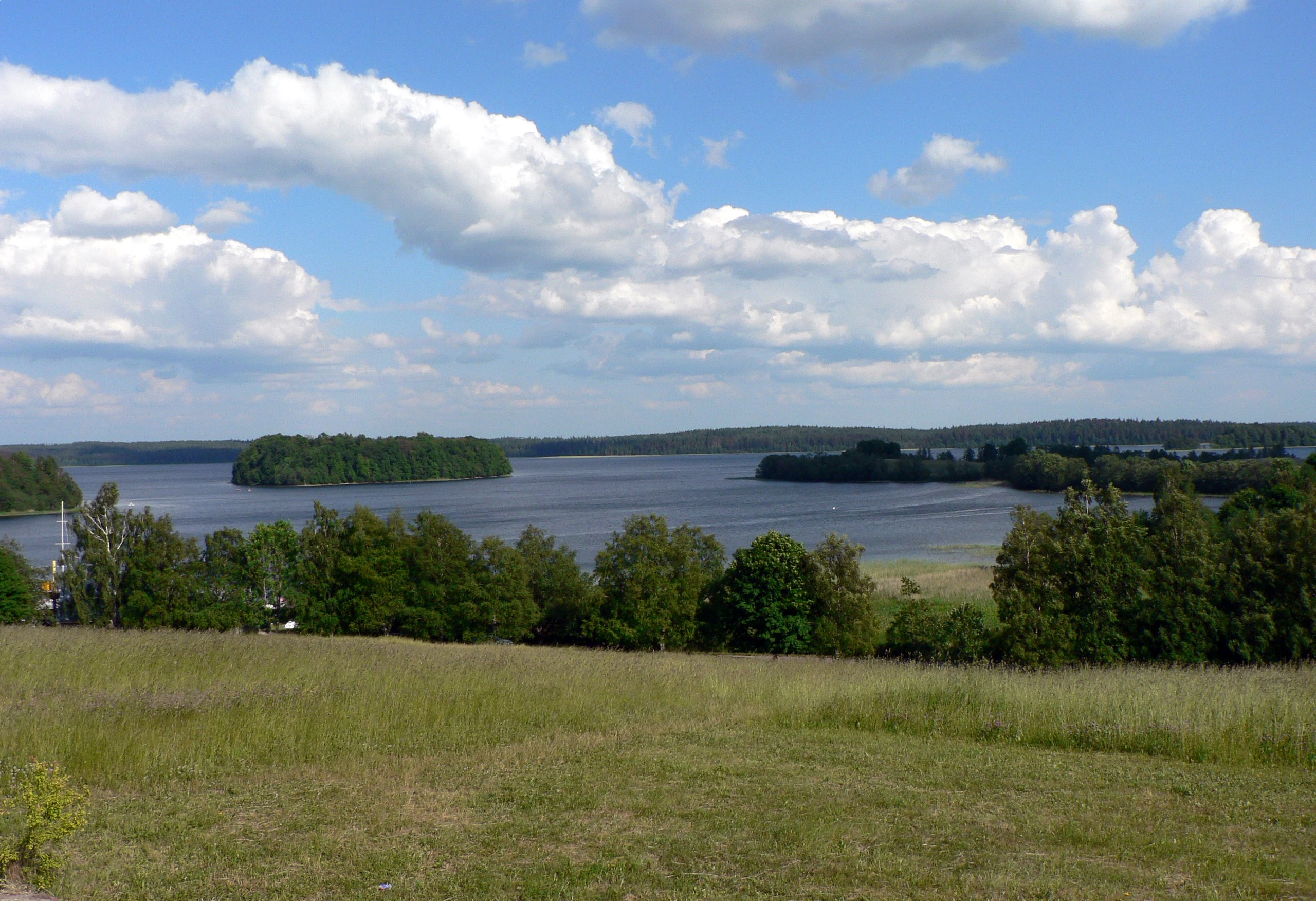
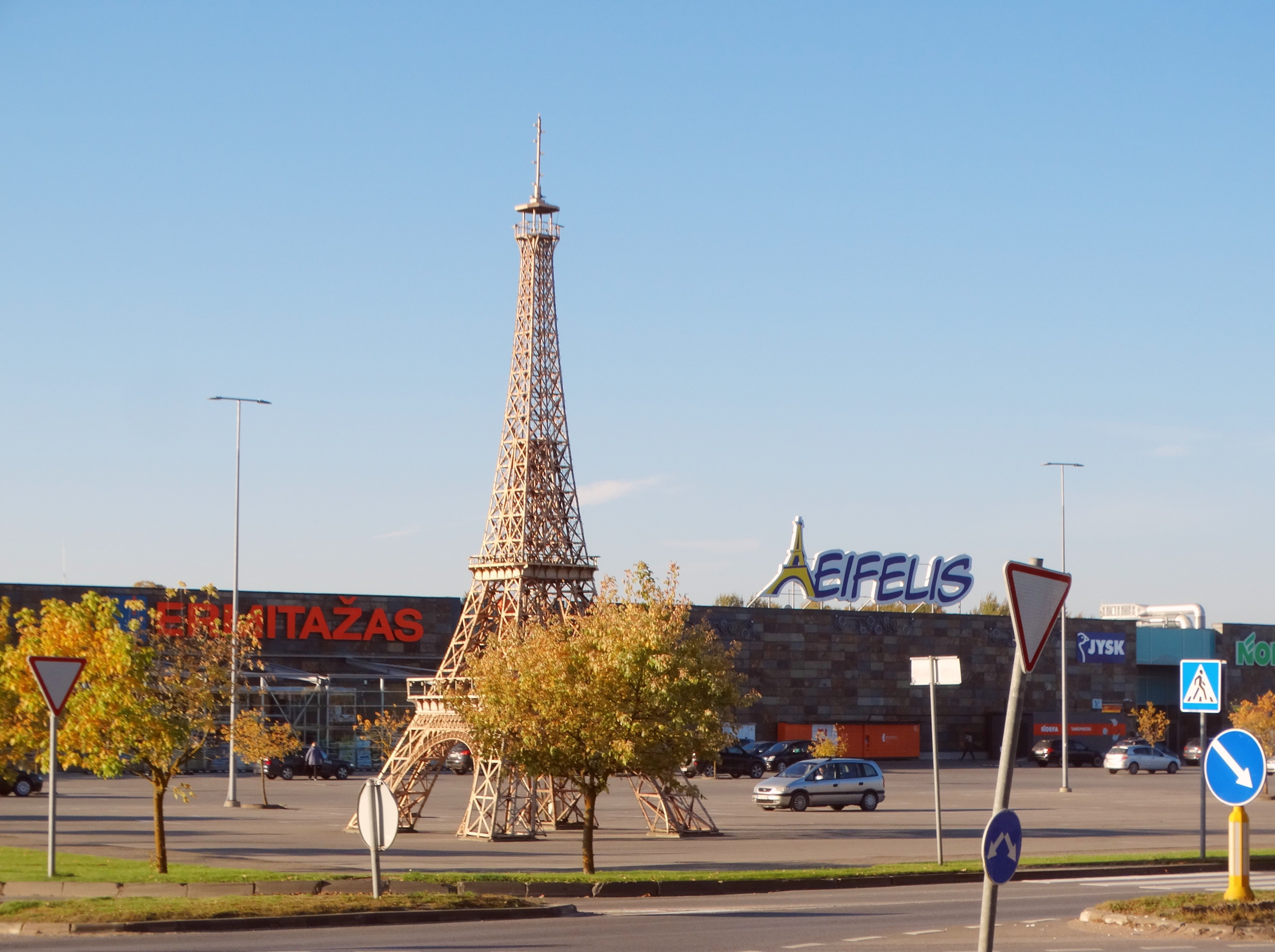
- From the top to bottom-right: Telšiai old town, Orlen Lietuva oil refinery near Mažeikiai, Windmill, Žemaitija National Park, shopping mall Eifelis in Mažeikiai

- Flag Coat of arms

- Location of Telšiai County
- Country: Lithuania
- Administrative centre: Telšiai
- Municipalities: List: Mažeikiai district municipality; Plungė district municipality; Rietavas municipality; Telšiai district municipality

Area
  - Total: 4,349 km^{2} (1,679 sq mi)
- (6.7% of the area of Lithuania)

Population (2020-01-01)
  - Total: 130,613
  - Rank: 8th of 10 (5.1% of the population of Lithuania)
  - Density: 30.03/km^{2} (77.78/sq mi)

GDP
  - Total: €2.3 billion (2023) · 6th
- Time zone: UTC+2 (EET)
  - Summer (DST): UTC+3 (EEST)
- ISO 3166 code: LT-TE
- HDI (2022): 0.850 very high · 5th

Telšiai County (Lithuanian: Telšių apskritis) is one of ten counties in Lithuania. It is in the west of the country, and its capital is Telšiai. There are Lithuanians (98.7%), Latvians (0.1%), Russians (0.9%), and others (0.3%). On 1 July 2010, the county administration was abolished, and since that date, Telšiai County remains as a territorial and statistical unit. It borders Latvia.

== Municipalities ==
Municipalities are:

Mažeikiai District Municipality
Plungė District Municipality
Rietavas Municipality
Telšiai District Municipality
