= List of islands of Lithuania =

This is a list of islands of Lithuania.

Notable islands in Lithuania include:

- Antakščiai Island, Lake Antakščiai
- Baluošo Ilgasalė, Lake Baluošas
- Bažnytėlė Island, Lake Galvė, Trakai, 54°39′42″N 24°55′54″E
- Beržoras Island, Lake Beržoras, 56°01′17″N 21°49′15″E
- Briedsalė, Lake Plateliai
- Briedžiai Island, Nemunas Delta
- Calves Island, Lake Plateliai
- Castle Island, Lake Plateliai
- Gaidsalė, Lake Plateliai
- Ilgio Islands, Lake Ilgis
- Jonava Neris Island, Neris, Jonava
- Kiaulės Nugara (Sala Kiaulės Nugara), Curonian Lagoon, Klaipėda, 55°39′29″N 21°08′15″E
- Kiemas Island, Curonian Lagoon
- Kubiliai Island, Curonian Lagoon
- Nemunas Island, Neman, Kaunas
- Pilis Island, Lake Galvė, Trakai
- Pliksalė, Lake Plateliai
- Ragininkai Island, Neman, 55°16′59″N 21°24′24″E
- Rusnė Island, Nemunas Delta, 55°18′51″N 21°20′57″E
- Šončelio Island, Lake Plateliai
- Triušiai Island, Curonian Lagoon, 55°17′02″N 21°17′04″E
- Ubagsalė, Lake Plateliai
- Veršių Island, Lake Plateliai
- Vytinė Island (Vito Sala), Curonian Lagoon, 55°16′45″N 21°16′17″E
- Žingelinė (Zingelinės Sala), Curonian Lagoon, 55°20′54″N 21°15′44″E
- Žvėrynas Neris Island, Neris, Vilnius

== See also ==
- List of islands in the Baltic Sea
- List of islands
