= Rusnė Island =

Lithuania's largest island

Rusnė
Native name: Rusnės sala
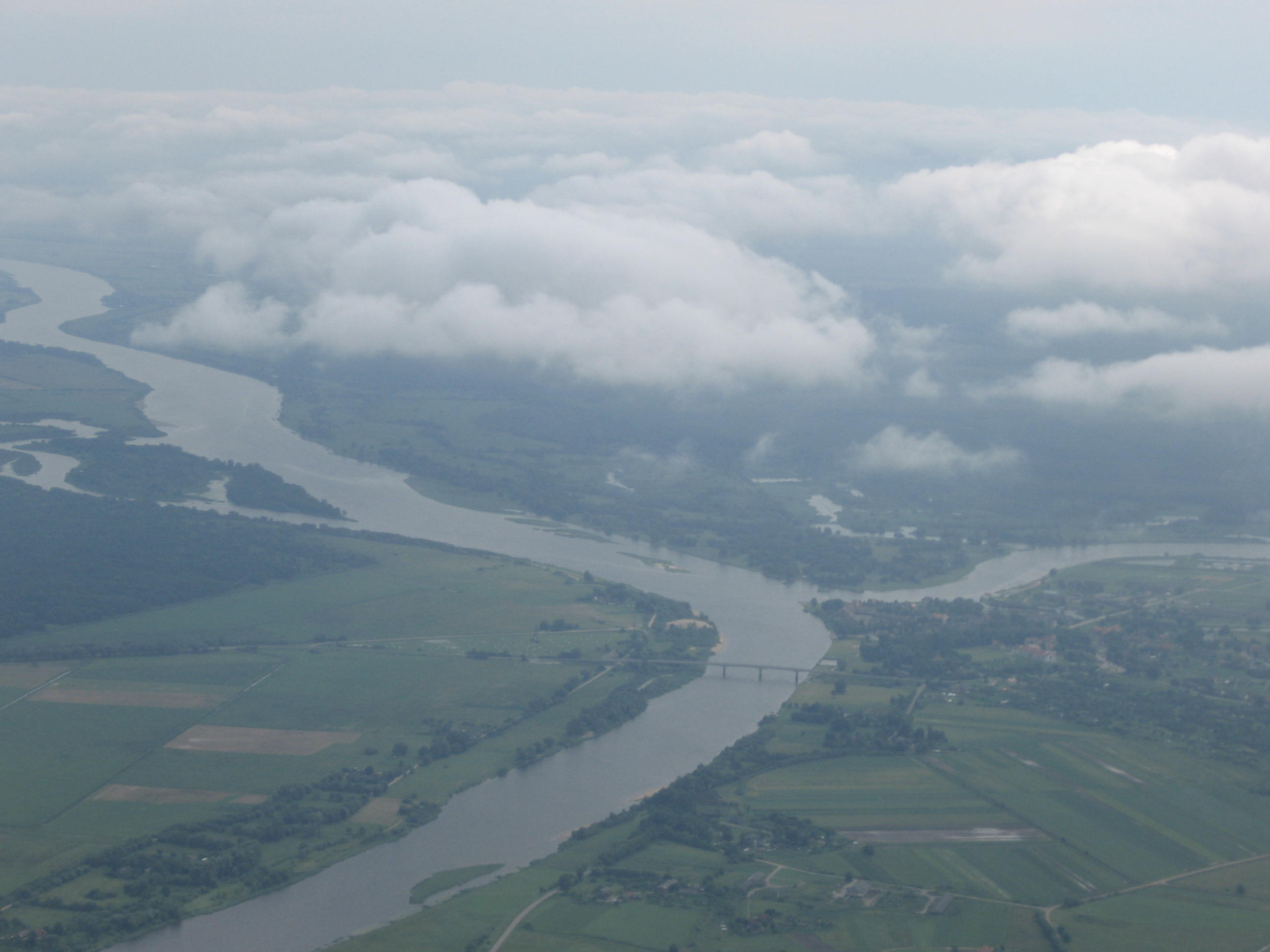
- Rusnė from the east, between two rivers
- Interactive map of Rusnė

Geography
- Location: Curonian Lagoon
- Coordinates: 55°18′N 21°22′E
- Area: 45 km^{2} (17 sq mi)
- Highest elevation: 1 m (3 ft)

Administration
- Lithuania
- County: Klaipėda County
- District: Šilutė District Municipality
- Eldership: Rusnė Eldership
- Largest settlement: Rusnė (capital) (pop. 1,600)

Demographics
- Population: 2,000 (2001)
- Pop. density: 43.5/km^{2} (112.7/sq mi)

Additional information
- Time zone: UTC+2

Rusnė Island is an island in Nemunas Delta, Šilutė District Municipality, Lithuania. It is located between Atmata and Skirvytė, distributaries of the Neman River, and the Curonian Lagoon. At 45 or 46 square kilometers, Rusnė is often considered Lithuania's largest island.

== Geography ==
The island's age has been estimated at 1,100 years. It was formed when the Neman River deposited its sediments before flowing into the Curonian Lagoon (see alluvial plain). Therefore, its elevation does not exceed 1.5 metres. One point in the island is 0.27 metres below sea level, which is the lowest point in Lithuania (an earlier measurement placed it at 1.3 metres below sea level). The island is subject to frequent flooding, particularly in spring due to ice dams. Floods and regular river flow deposit new sediments increasing the area of the island. Floodwaters are removed by pumping, using an extensive system of canals and polders. The polder and embankment system has not always been able to contain floods such as the one in 1958.

The island contains several distributaries of the rivers Atmata and Skirvytė (Pakalnė, Vorusnė, Skatulė, Rusnaitė, etc.). In addition, it has two rivulets (Naikupė and Ulmas) that are not part of the distributary system. Its natural values are protected by its inclusion within Nemunas Delta Regional Park.

== Human history ==
Recorded history includes its settlement by fishermen and subsequent Livonian Order control. Its location near the junction of the Nemunas and the Baltic Sea lent it some strategic importance as a point on trade routes and during the battles for control of Samogitia. A church in the town of Rusnė dates to 1419.

The main businesses in the island are sailing, canoeing tourism, and fishing. The town of Rusnė, with 1,131 inhabitants, is the largest populated place on the island. The only bridge between the mainland and the island leads to Rusnė. The first bridge was completed in 1914 but was destroyed during World War II. The current bridge was built in 1974. Rusnė Island Cultural and Information Office operates in Rusnė.

After Lithuania re-established its independence in 1990, collective farming on the island ended and individual landowners lacked the resources to use the machinery needed to clear the fields. This led to the growth of vegetation that was inhospitable to migratory birds, an internationally problematic issue since the island lies within the East Atlantic Flyway. An NGO, The Lithuanian Fund for Nature, successfully spearheaded a drive to restore the meadows that had been used by various bird species. The initiative was supported by local farmers.

== Settlements ==
- Rusnė
- Šyškrantė
- Pakalnė
- Uostadvaris
- Skirvytė
- Vorusnė
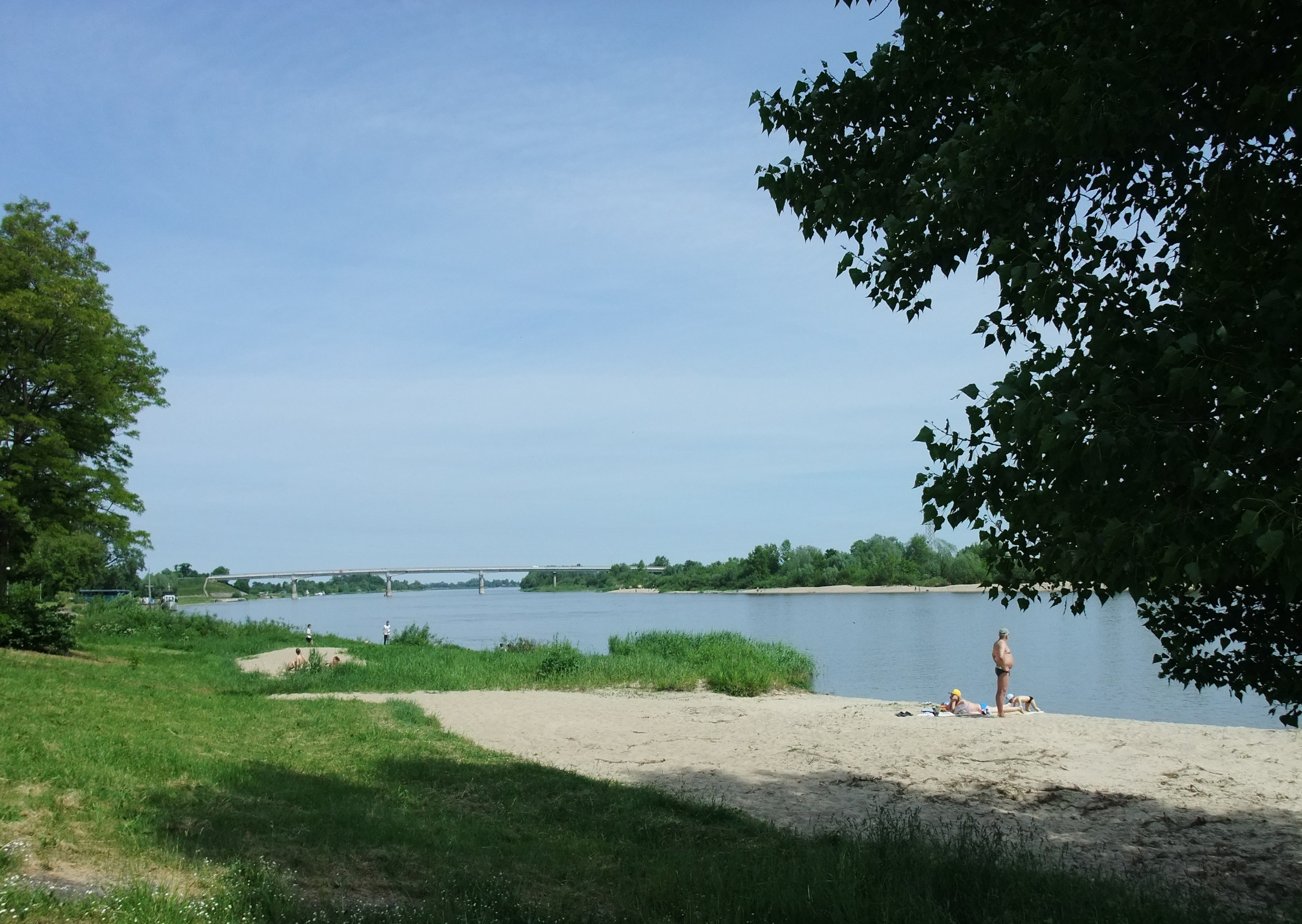
Bridge between island and mainland

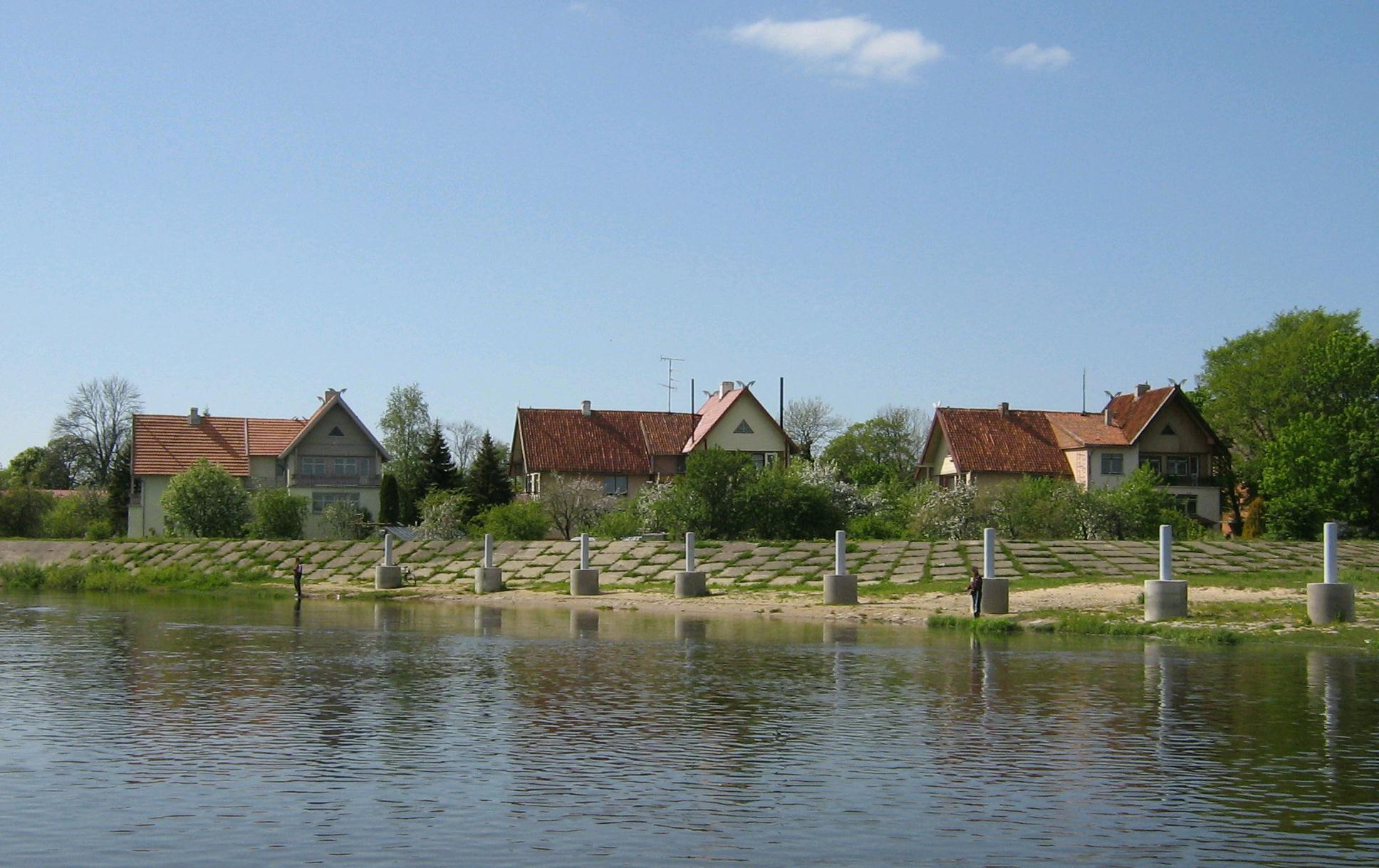
Rusnė Town

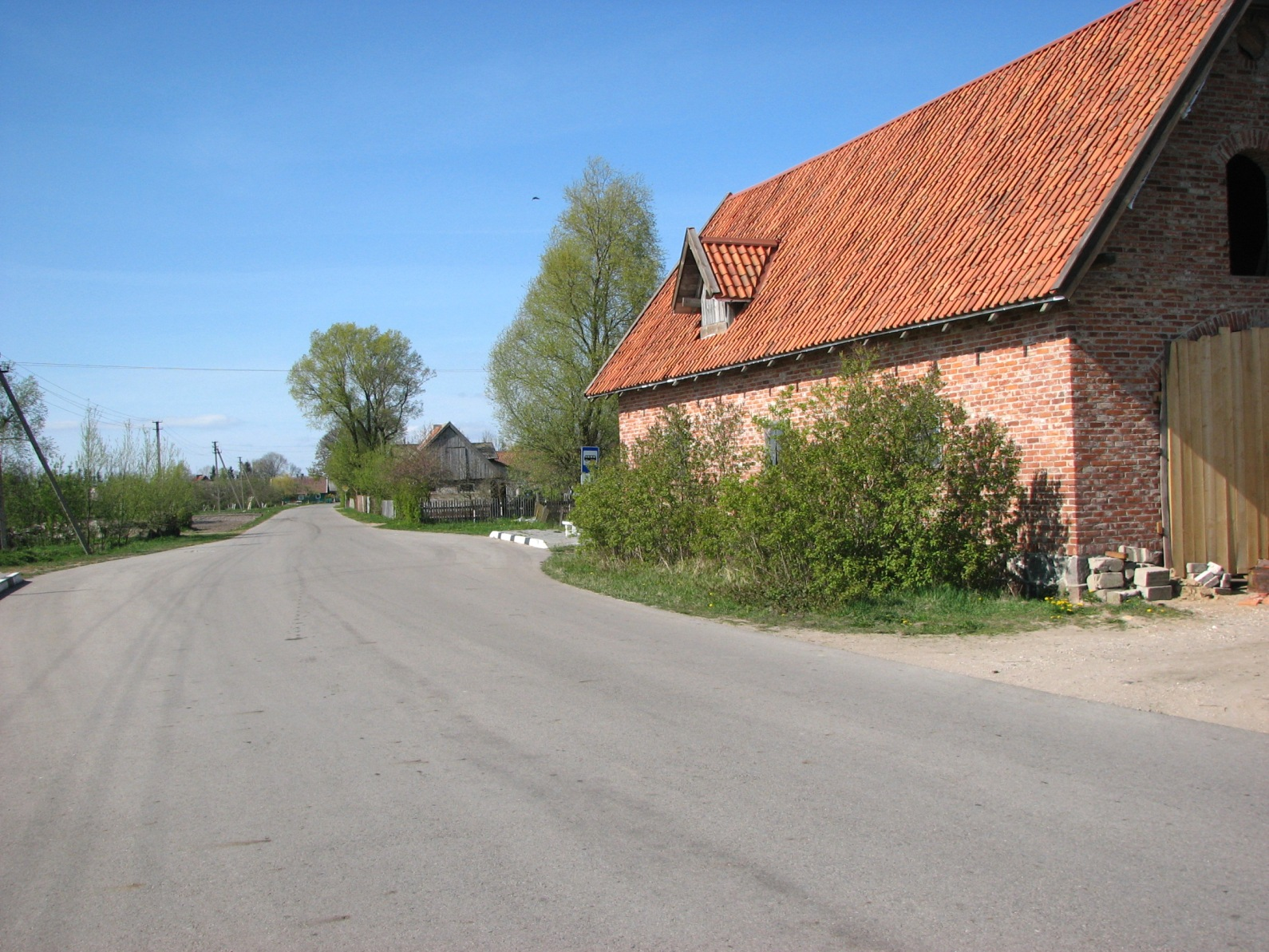
Šyškrantė

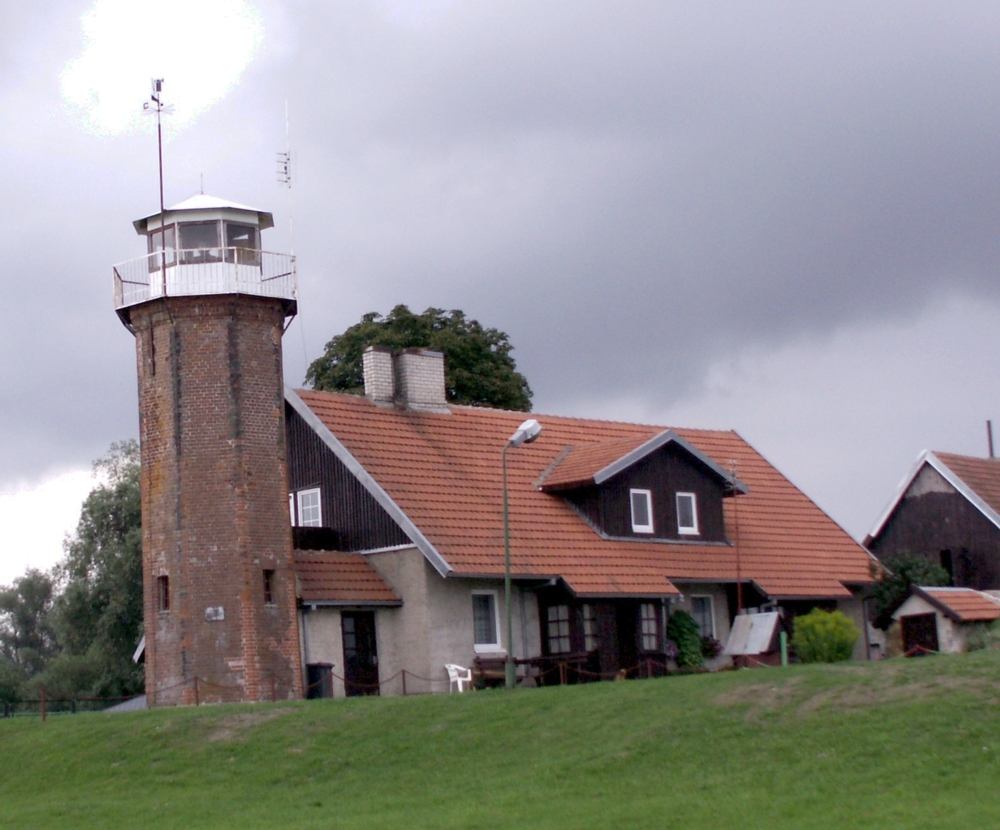
Uostadvaris
