= Krokų Lanka =

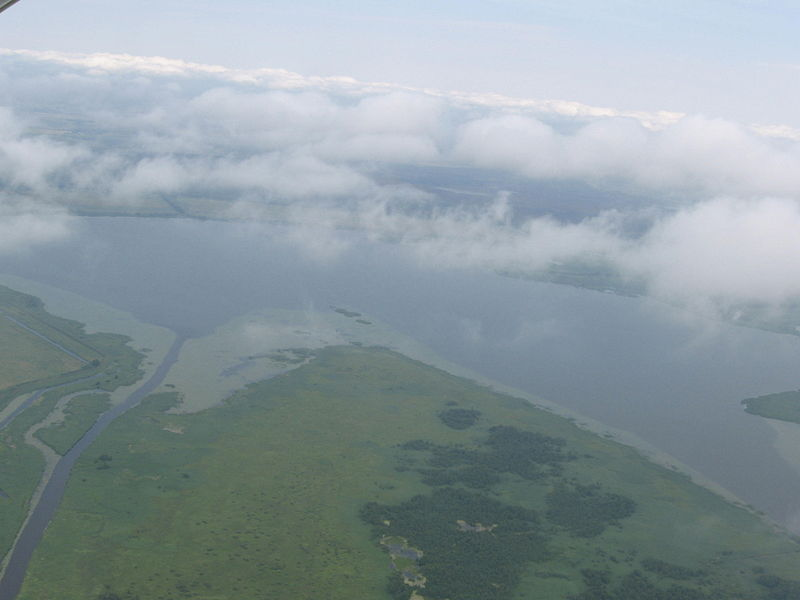

- Location within Lithuania
- Coordinates: 55°21′52″N 21°19′53″E
- Type: Marine / lagoon lake
- Basin countries: Lithuania
- Max. length: 4.1 km (2.5 mi)
- Max. width: 3.3 km (2.1 mi)
- Surface area: 788 ha (1,950 acres)
- Average depth: 1.9 m (6 ft 3 in)
- Max. depth: 2.5 m (8 ft 2 in)

Krokų Lanka is the only lake of marine origin in Lithuania and the largest lake in the Šilutė District Municipality. It is located in the Nemunas Delta Regional Park on the Baltic Sea shore near Nemunas Delta and Ventė Cape. It covers a territory of 788 ha. Aukštumala bog, covering 3018 ha and used for peat production since 1882, is located just north of the lake and Mingė village is located on the western bank. In the south a narrow strip of water connects the lake with Atmata, a branch of the Neman River.

Krokų Lanka was created when alluvial deposits from the Neman River separated a part of the Curonian Lagoon. The lake is very shallow, with greatest depth of only 2.5 meters, and overgrown with water plants. It is poised to eventually turn into a bog but now it is a paradise for a variety of water birds, including Eurasian bittern (Botaurus stellaris), greylag goose (Anser anser), Montagu's harrier (Circus pygargus), black-tailed godwit (Limosa limosa), Eurasian curlew (Numenius arquata). In spring and fall the lake attracts large groups of migratory birds. Krokų Lanka is also important area for spawning fishes. To protect this environment botanical and zoological reserve, covering 1214 ha, was established in 1992.
