= Nemunas Delta Regional Park =

Coordinates: 55°18′N 21°24′E

Nemunas Delta Regional Park, established in 1994, is located in Lithuania within the Nemunas Delta where the Nemunas flows into the Baltic Sea. The park covers 29,013 ha.

The park, a Ramsar Convention site, lies on the East Atlantic Flyway, a major bird migration route; over 70,000 migratory birds are ringed there annually. About one-fifth of it is covered by water, including Lake Krokų Lanka and the rivers Rusne, Skirvyte, Atmata, Pakalne, Vorusne, and Aukstumale. It also supports hay and dairy farming, fishing, hunting, peat production, tourism, recreation, and conservation education.
