= Rusnė =

- Town
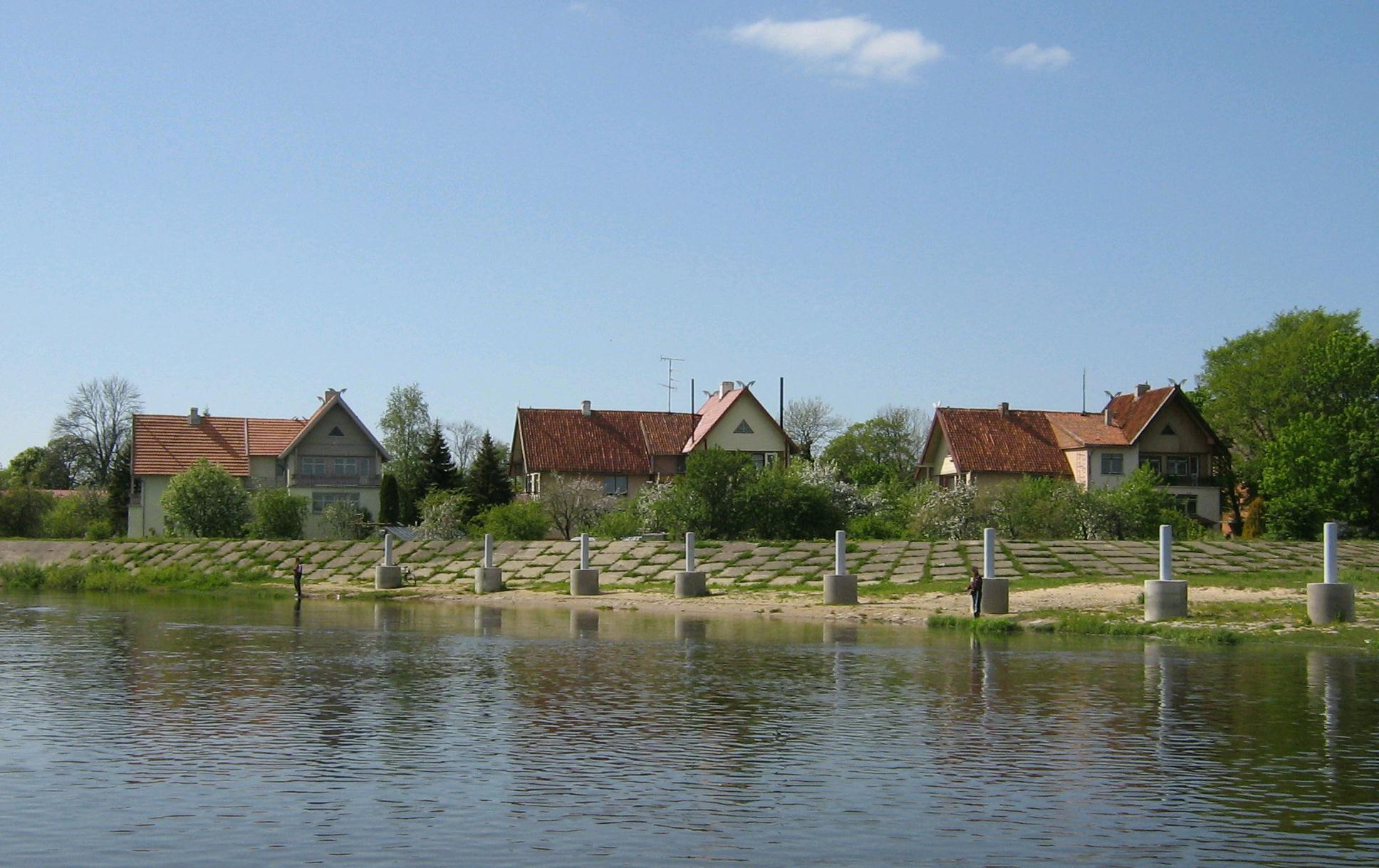

- Flag Coat of arms
- Interactive map of Rusnė
- Location within Lithuania
- Coordinates: 55°17′50″N 21°22′40″E
- Country: Lithuania
- County: Klaipėda County
- Municipality: Šilutė district municipality
- Elderate: Rusnė elderate

Population (2021)
  - Total: 1,131
- Time zone: UTC+2 (EET)
  - Summer (DST): UTC+3 (EEST)

Rusnė (German: Ruß) is a border town in Šilutė district, Lithuania, located on the Rusnė Island in the Nemunas Delta, 9 km south-west from Šilutė.

== History ==
Rusnė was first mentioned in historical sources in the 14th century. In 1419 the first church was built in Rusnė, and in 1553 a Lithuanian parish school was established. In 1863 the Rusnė synagogue opened.

In 1946 Rusnė received municipal rights, and in 1967 the whole Island of Rusnė was given this status.

== Geography ==
Some parts of the town of Rusnė near Lake Dumblė are located below the sea level and are the lowest in Lithuania.

Rusnė is on the Russian border, which is marked by the Skirvytė river.

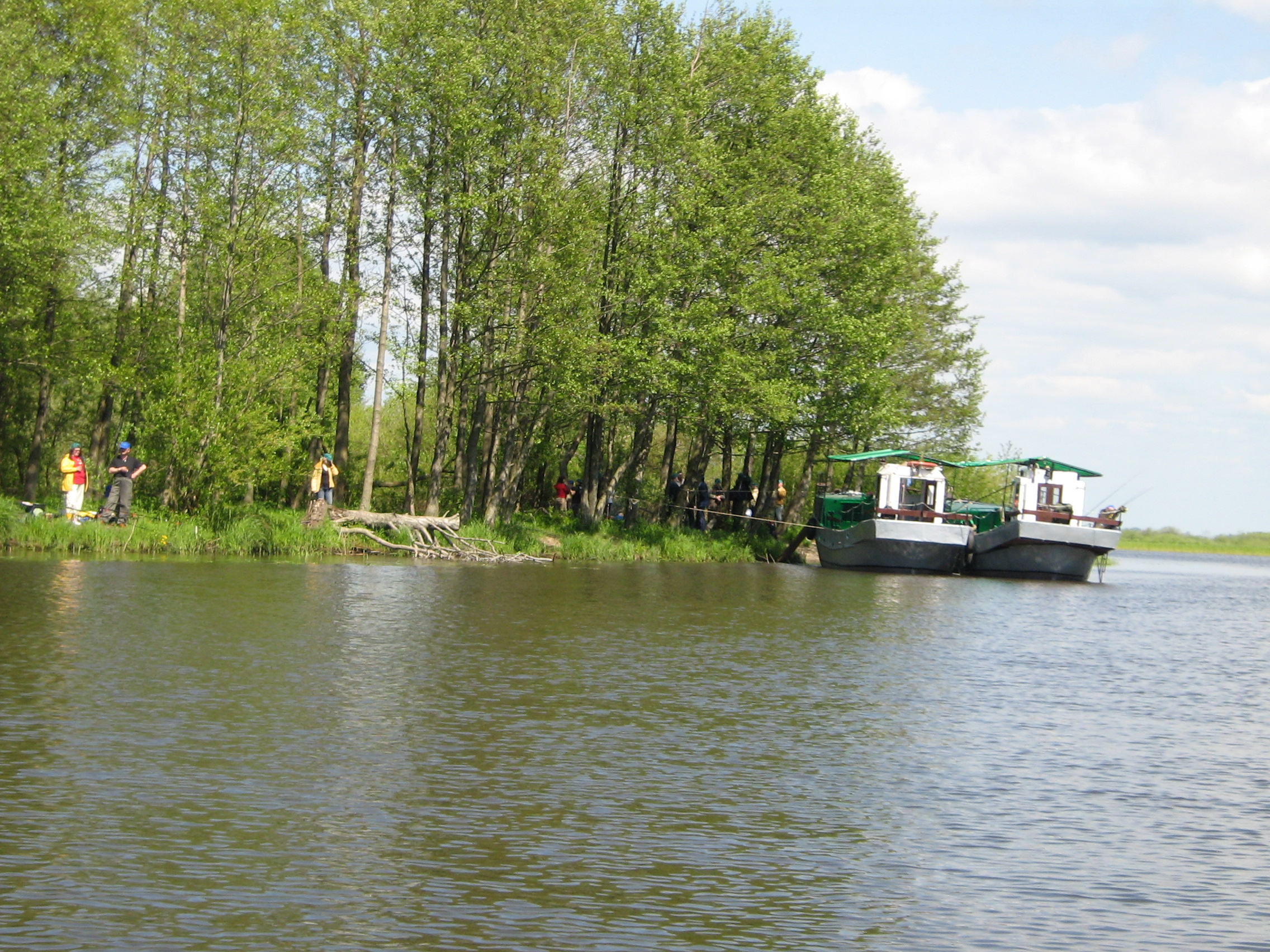
Anglers in Rusnė island

== Tourism ==
Rusnė town and Rusnė island is very popular place for angling, as Nemunas delta is rich in various kinds of fish, and tourism infrastructure is built up in recent years. It is also a popular place for birdwatching.

== Notable residents ==
- Heinrich Ancker (1850–1900), member of the Reichstag
- Gerhard Gregor (1906–1981), musician
- Rudolf Jenett (1914–1998), majorgeneral of the Bundeswehr
- Hermann Kallenbach (1871–1945) architect
- Charlotte Keyser (1890–1966), writer
- Otto D. Tolischus (1890–1967), journalist

== Image gallery ==
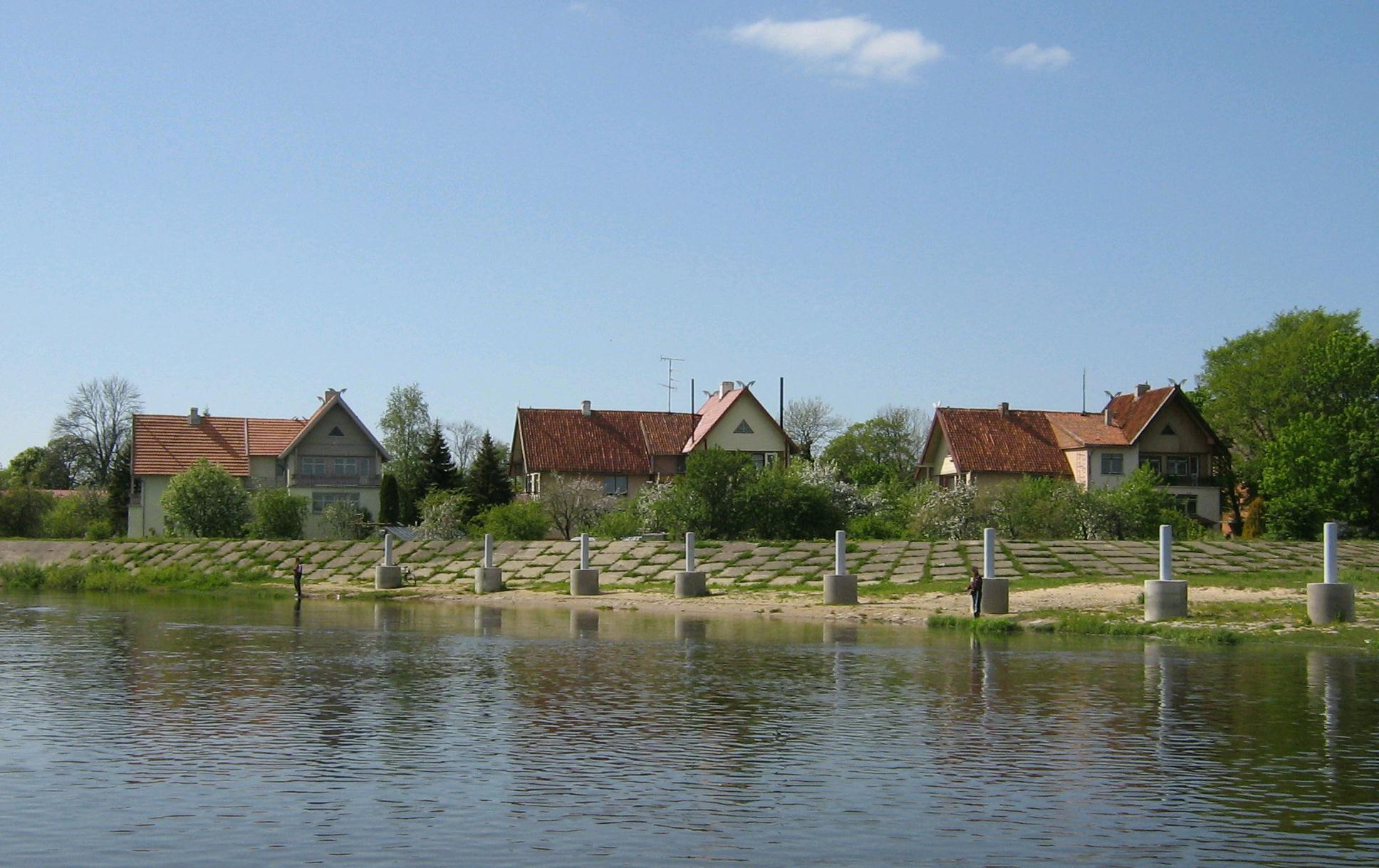
View of Rusnė

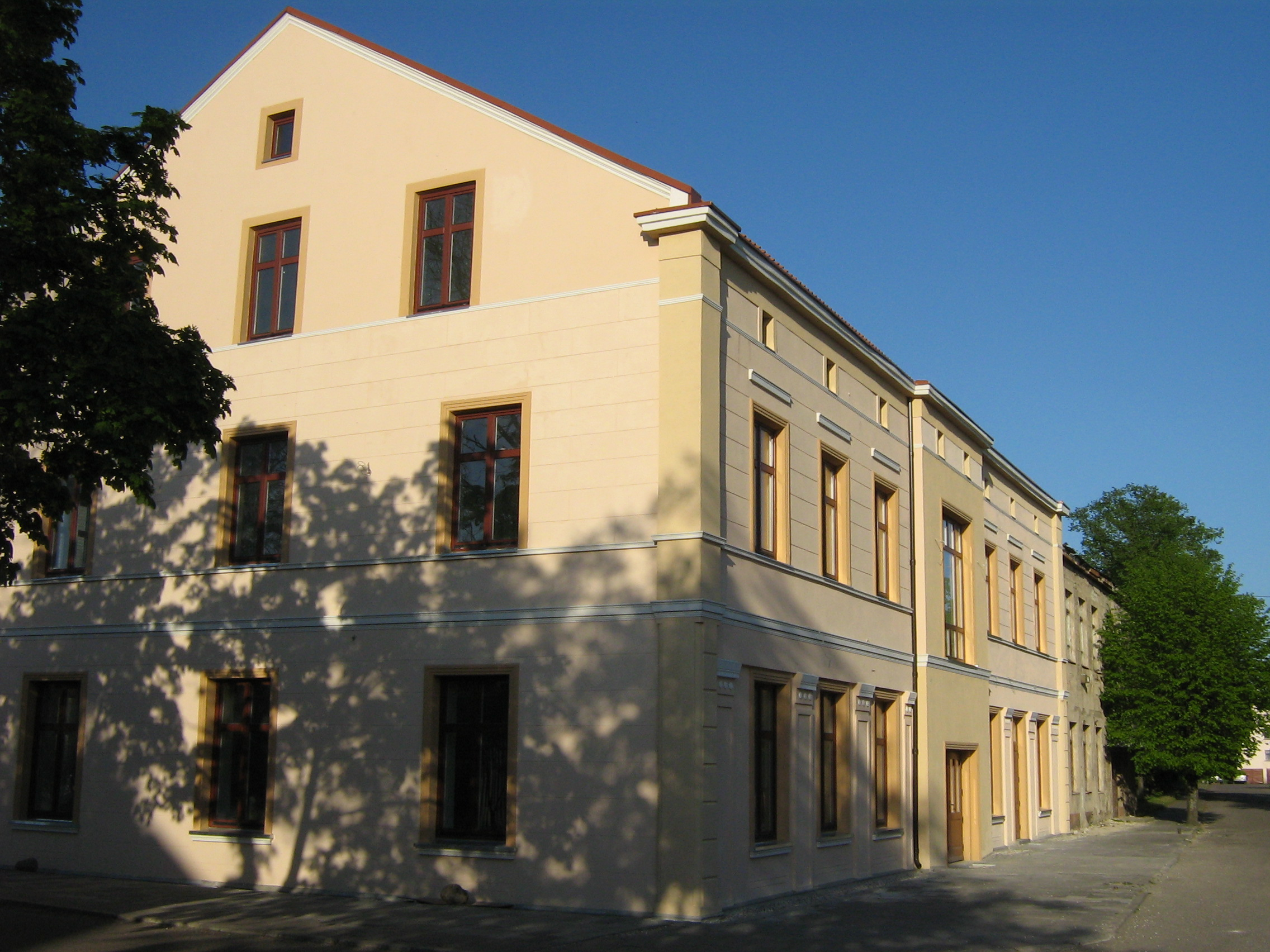
Rusnė housing

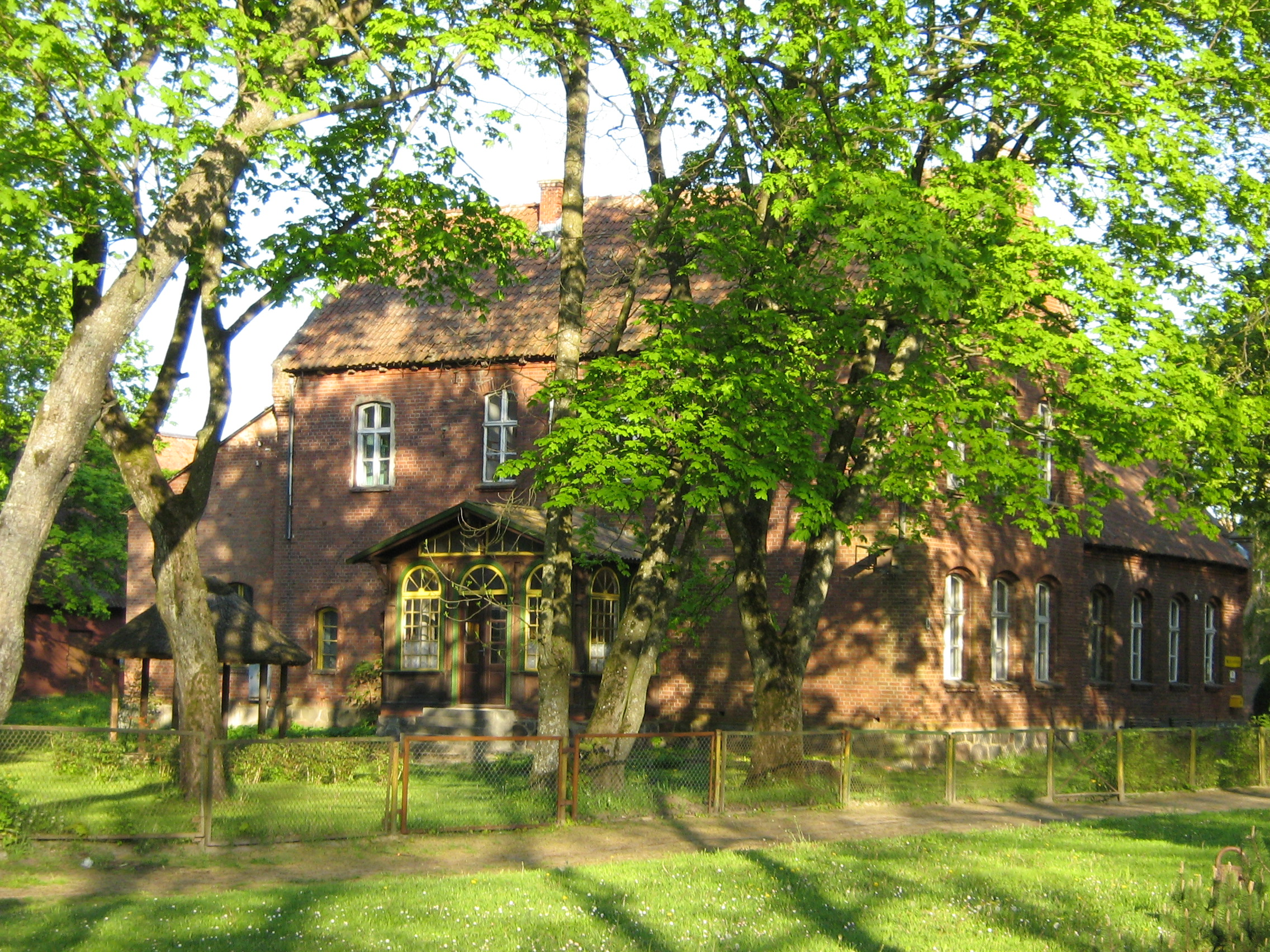
Old Rusnė rectory, now a post office

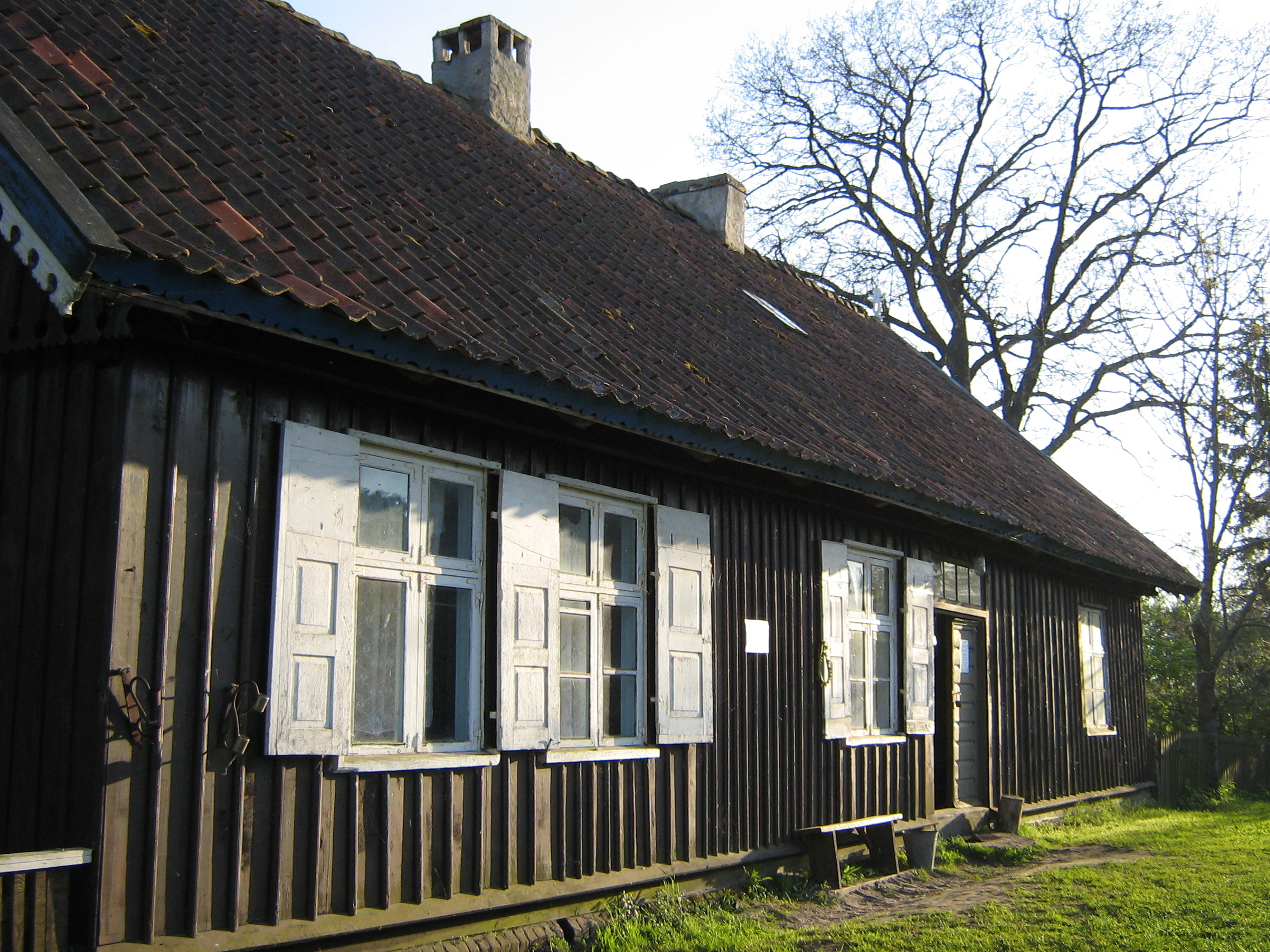
Ethnographic museum near Rusnė

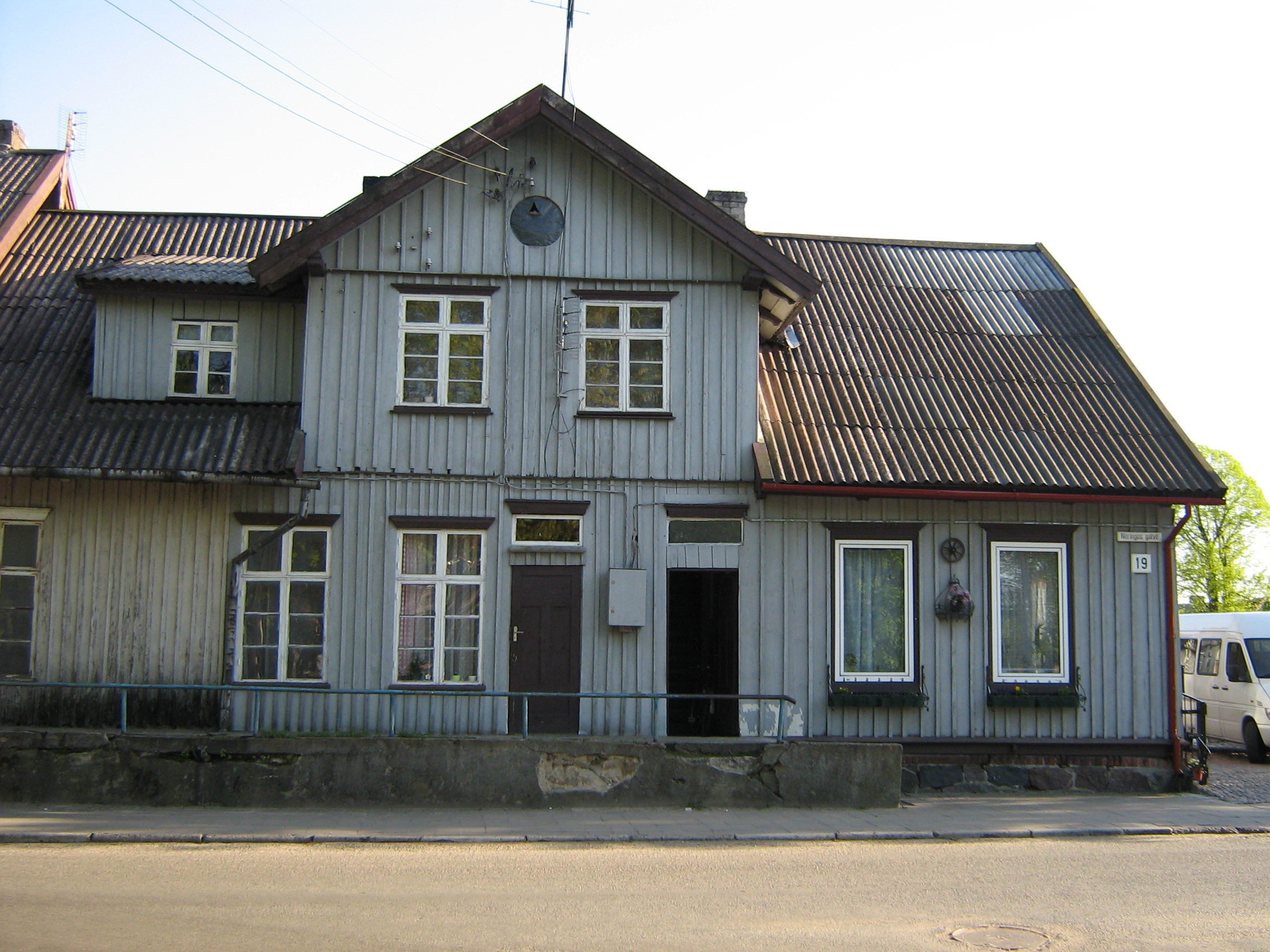
House in the Rusnė central square

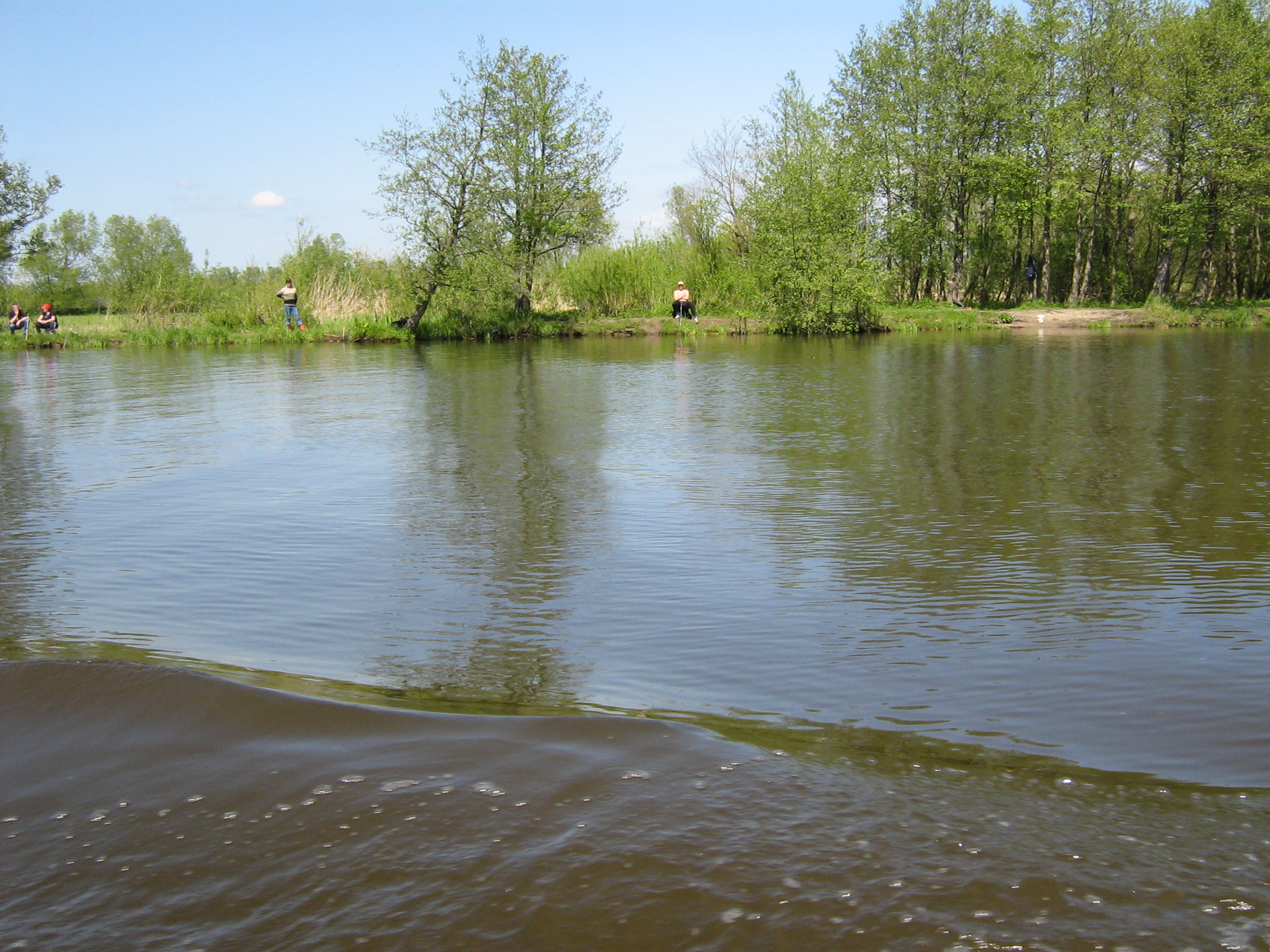
Anglers on Rusnė island

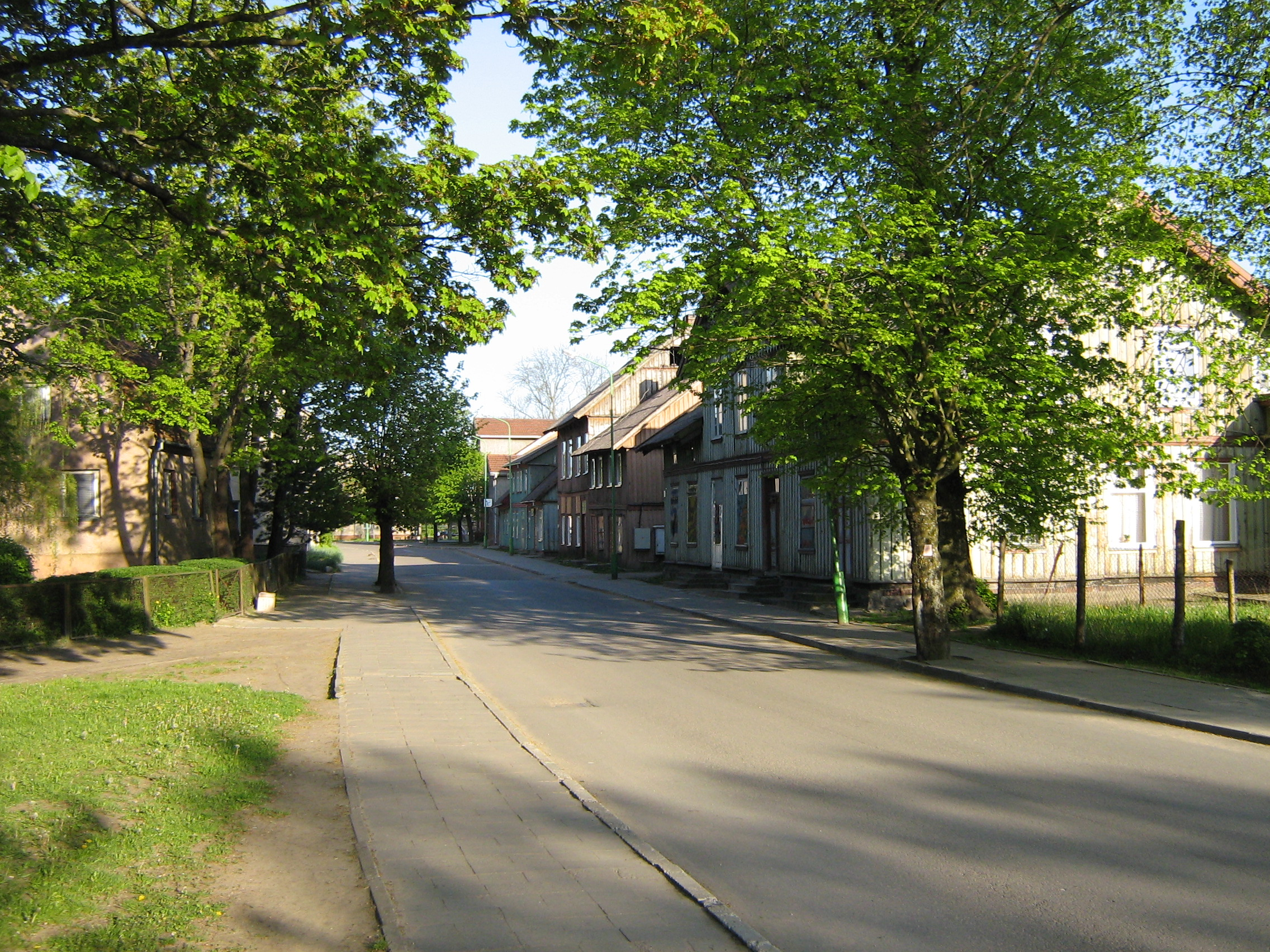
Neringa street

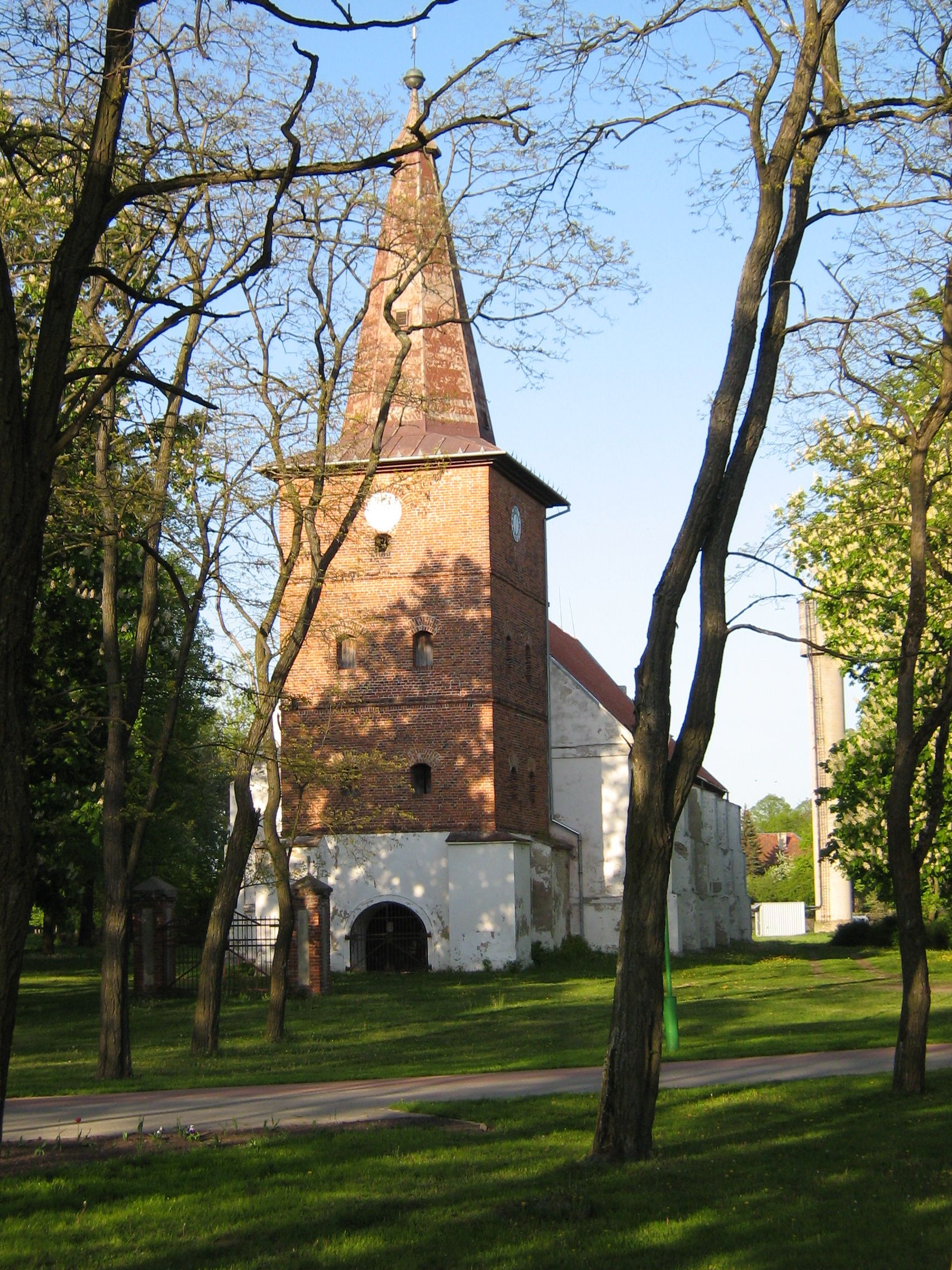
Lutheran church in Rusnė

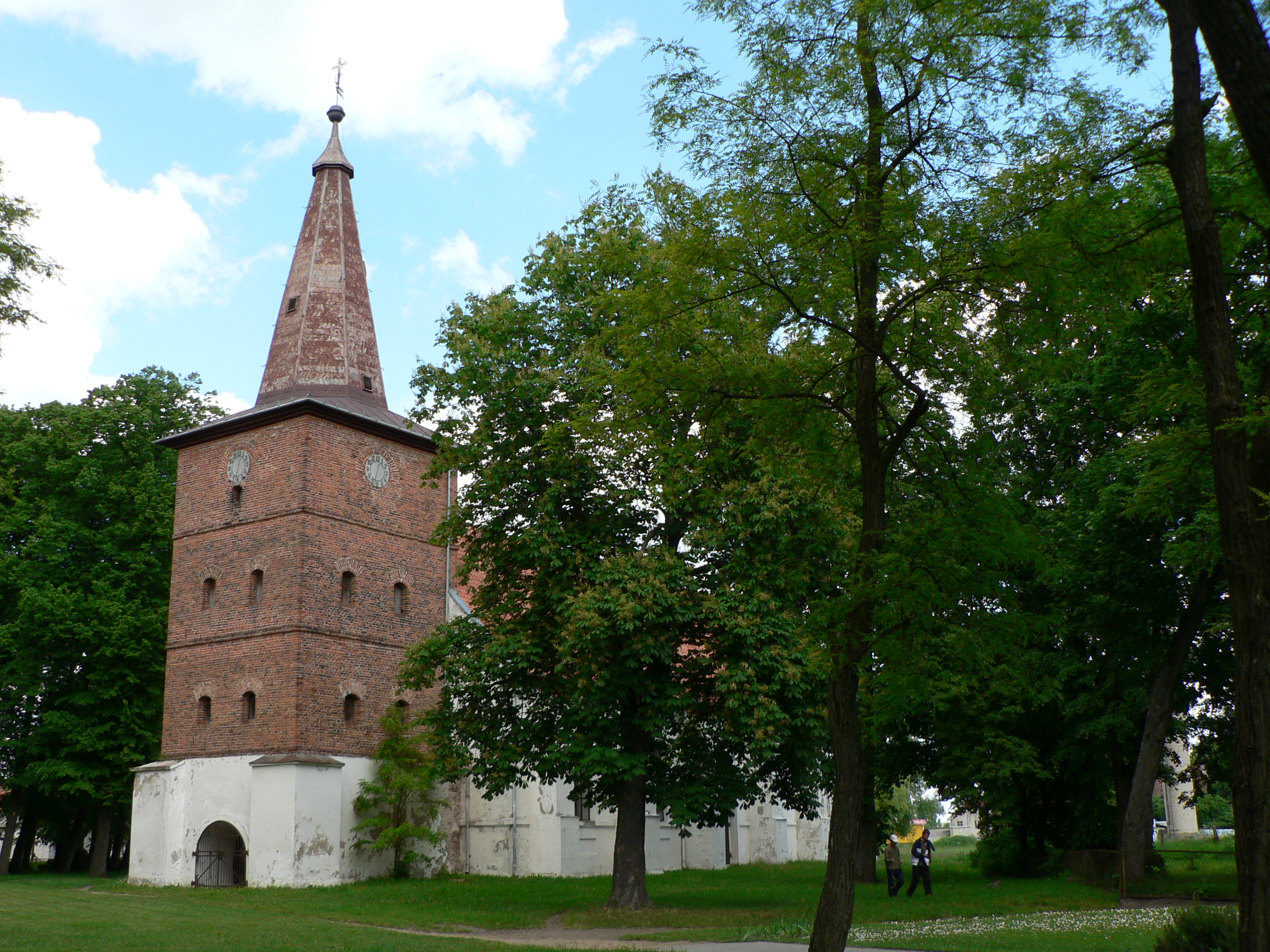
The church (1809) in Rusnė
