= Plokštinė missile base =

Museum and former Soviet base in Lithuania

Cold War Museum in Plungė
- Šaltojo Karo Muziejus, Plungė
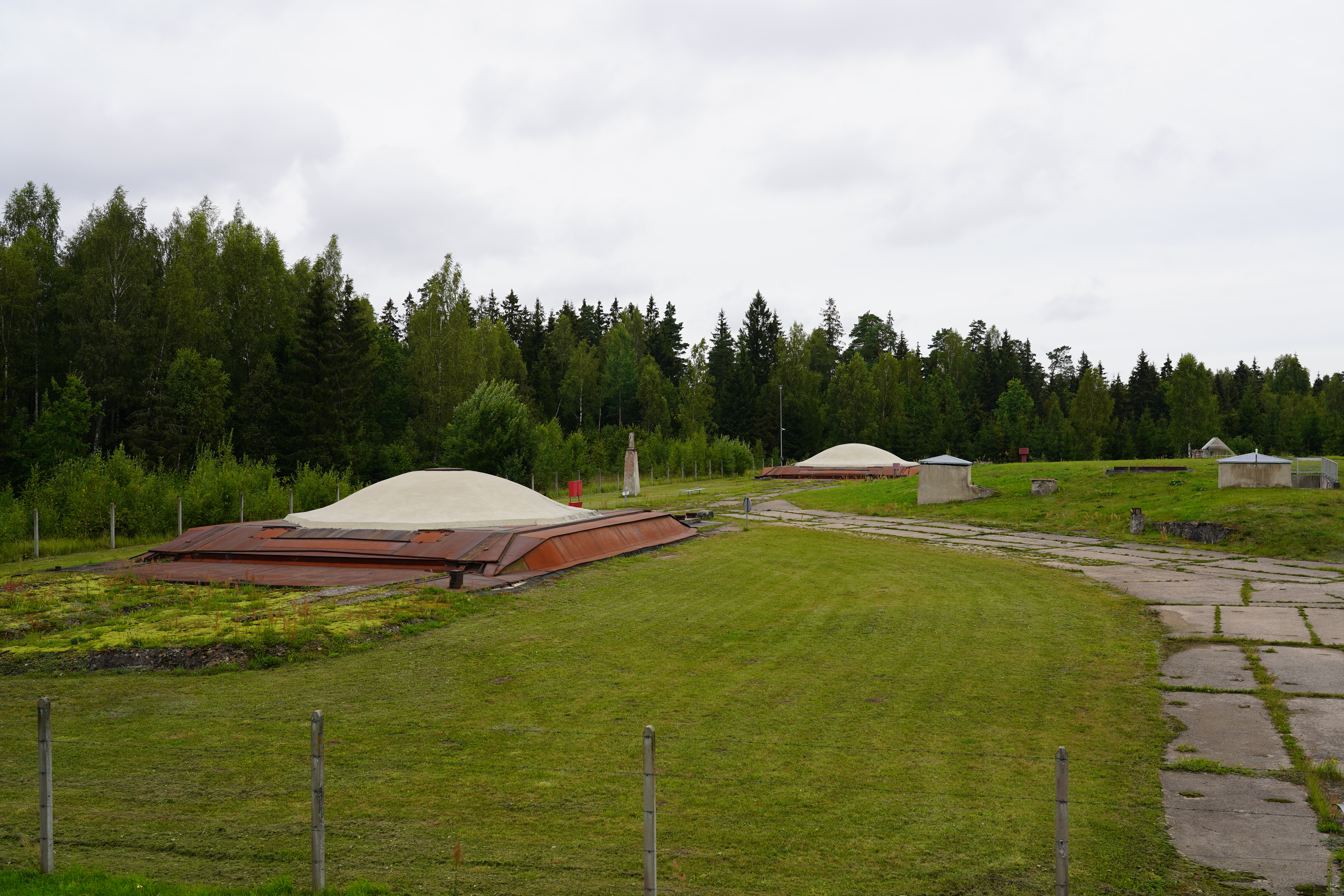
- The dome covering the R-12 Dvina missile silo
- Former name: Plokštinė missile base
- Established: 2012 (as a museum)
- Location: Šilinės str. 4, Plokščiai village, Plungė District Municipality, Lithuania
- Coordinates: 56°1′39″N 21°54′33″E

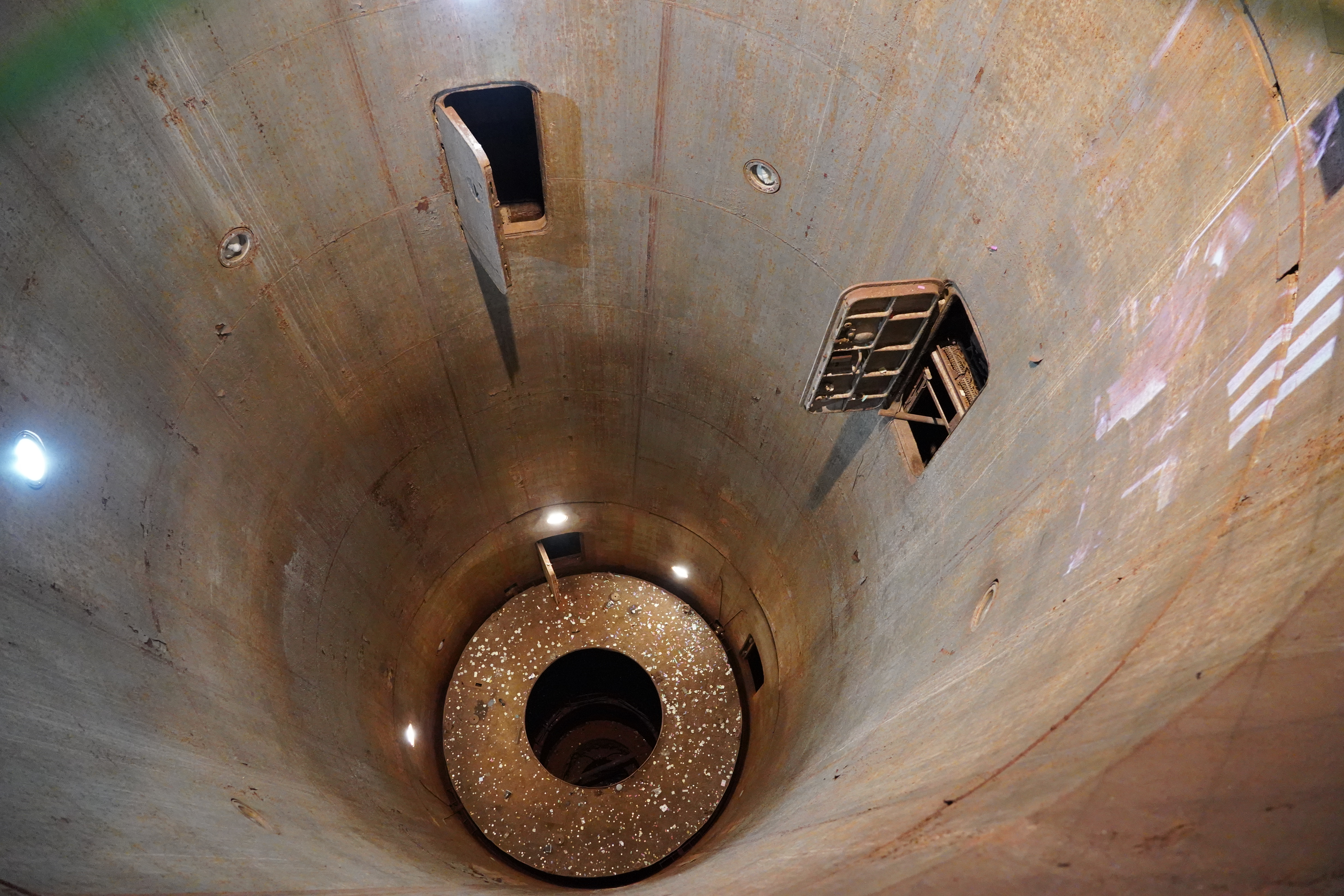
Underground missile silo.

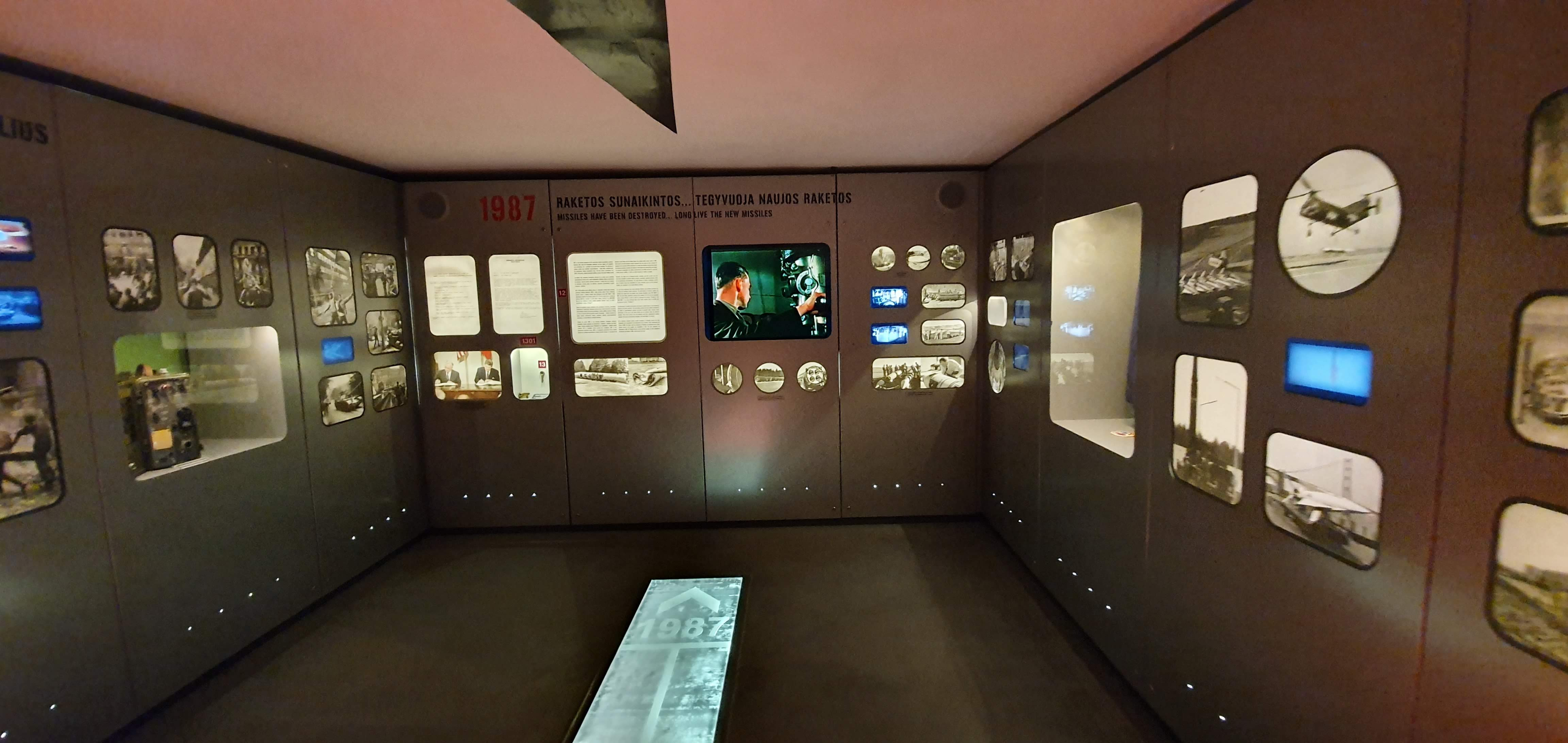
An exhibition room in the Cold War Museum.

Plokštinė missile base (Lithuanian: Plokštinės raketų bazė) was an underground base of the Soviet Union. It was built near Plokščiai village, 13 kilometres (8.1 mi) north of Plungė, in the sparsely populated Plokštinė forest near Plateliai Lake, Samogitia, Lithuania. This was the first nuclear missile base of the Soviet Union built to house underground R-12 Dvina (NATO reporting name: SS-4 Sandal) ballistic medium-range missiles. In 2012, the Cold War Museum was opened at the site.

== History ==
=== Construction ===
When the United States started building underground military bases in the late 1950s, the Soviet Union felt the need to maintain its military capabilities. Therefore, in September 1960, the Soviet Union started the rapid construction of an underground military base. It was one of the first in the Soviet Union, near the village of Plokščiai in the Lithuanian SSR.

The location of the missile base meant that its R-12 Dvina missiles (which had a range of about 2,080 km) could reach all of the European NATO members and NATO member Turkey. In addition, the soil was easy to excavate and the local population was small. There were no bigger towns or villages nearby, just isolated houses whose inhabitants were paid 4,500 roubles to relocate.

In 1960, more than 10,000 Soviet soldiers started to secretly work in the Žemaitija National Park for over two years. The costs of construction were comparable to the costs of building a city district or a small town.

=== Operation ===
The base was regarded as one of the top Soviet military secrets, only to be revealed by U.S. reconnaissance in 1978. The Plokštinė nuclear missile launch site started operating around three years after it was established.

The base boasted of a network of tunnels and included four deep shafts that have a depth between 27 and 34 meters. They were covered by concrete domes that could be moved aside on rails in 30 minutes. The base could stay autonomous for 15 days, or for three hours if also hermetically sealed. The surrounding electric fence was normally connected to 220 V, with a possibility to raise the voltage to 1700 V in case of an alert. The active team consisted of about 300 people, most of them military guards.

The base included four silos that housed R-12 Dvina missiles with nuclear warheads. They weighed more than 40 tonnes, including 1,500-kilogram (3,300 lb) warhead. These surface-to-surface missiles had a range of a little less than 2,500 kilometres (1,600 mi). No missiles, even for tests, were launched from the base. Launching a rocket required the near simultaneous turning of two different keys by two operators.

The site appears to have been operated by the 79th Guards Missile Regiment, part of the 29th Guards Rocket Division.

The officers and their families lived in Plunge, while the soldiers lived in a military townlet. There was only a limited number of ethnic Lithuanians in the personnel.

=== After decommissioning ===
After twelve years of operations, the site was shut down. After the collapse of the Soviet Union, the site was abandoned and not maintained. It was visited by urban explorers and suffered from numerous metal thefts.

=== In popular culture ===
The missile base appears in season 5 of Person of Interest series.

== Cold War Museum ==
After extensive reconstruction in 2012, the former base site now hosts the Cold War Museum, opening one of the four existing silos for visitors. The museum exhibitions include various missiles, their internal systems, military and other equipment used by the Eastern Bloc as well as NATO during the Cold War.

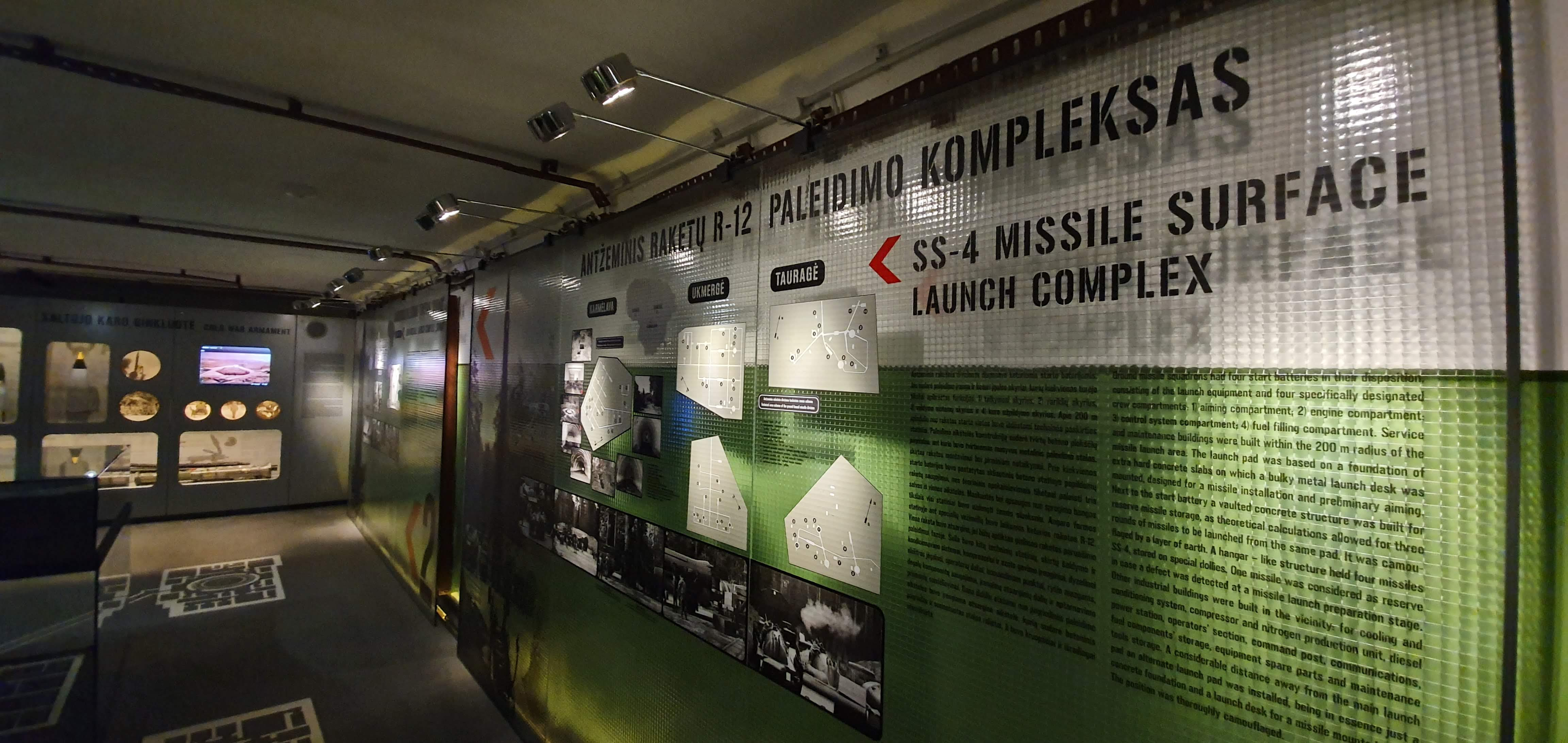
SS-4 missile information stand

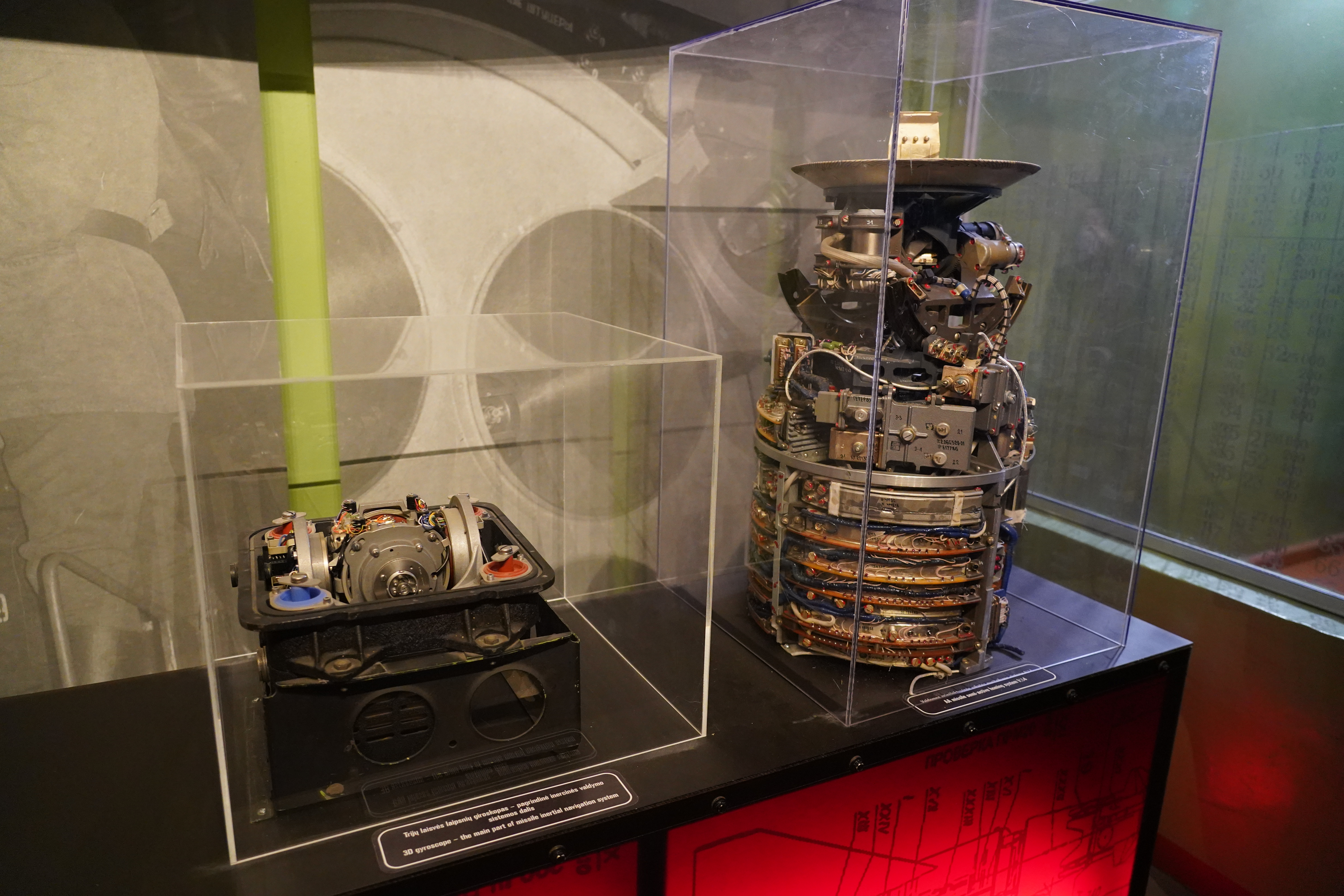
3D gyroscope and semi-active radar homing system

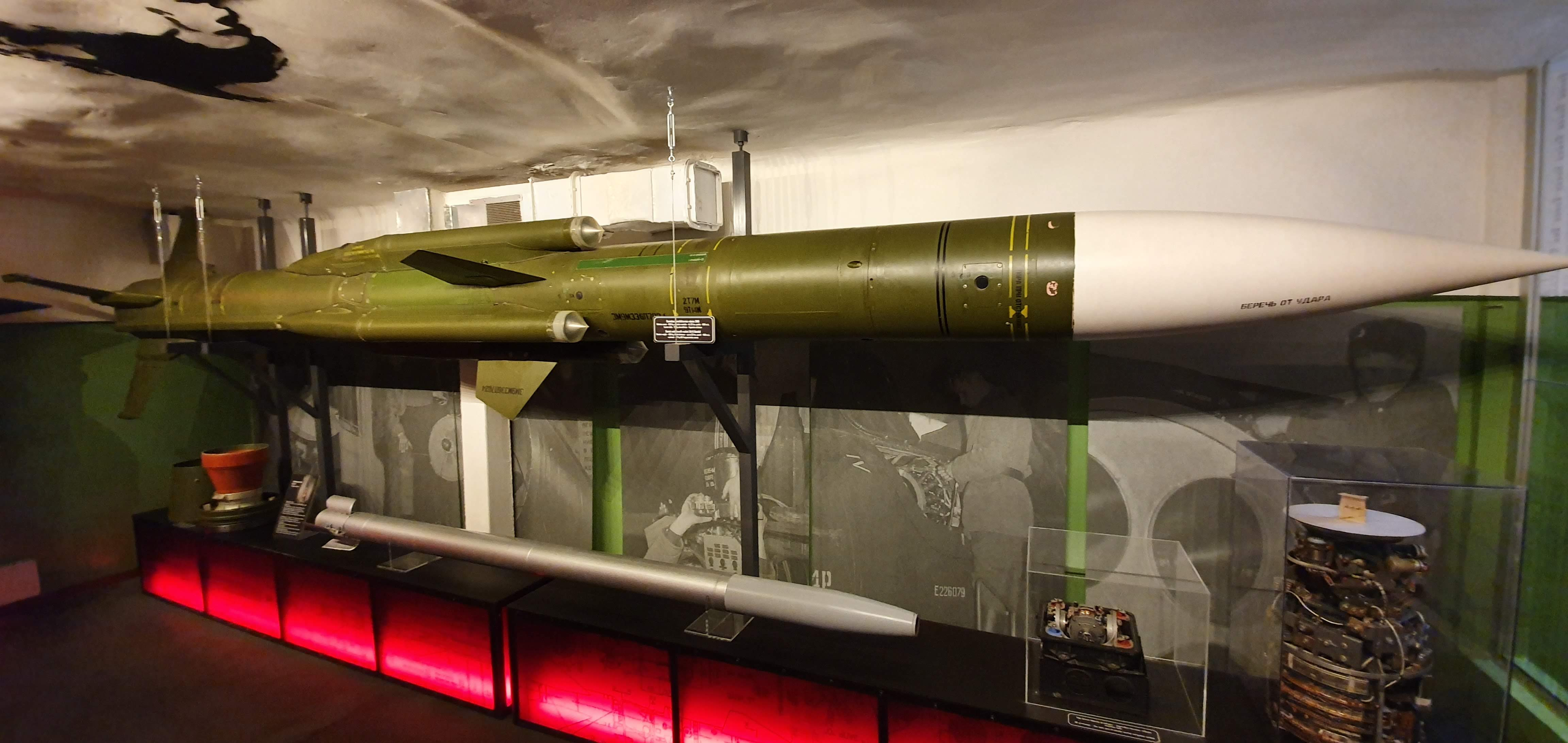
Missile used in the SA-6 air defence system

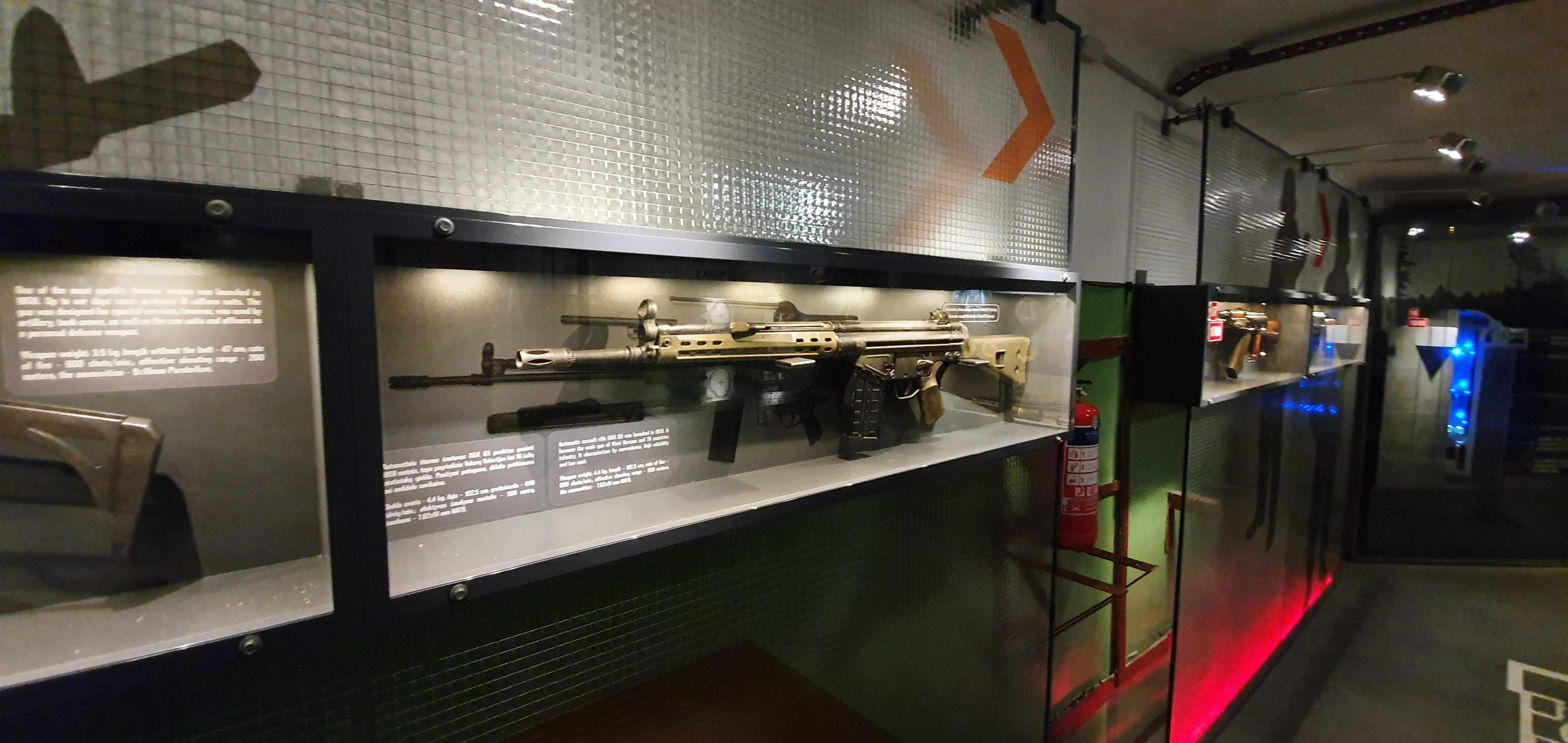
Exhibition of the Heckler & Koch G3 used by West Germany
