= Žemaitija National Park =

National park in Lithuania

- IUCN category II (national park)
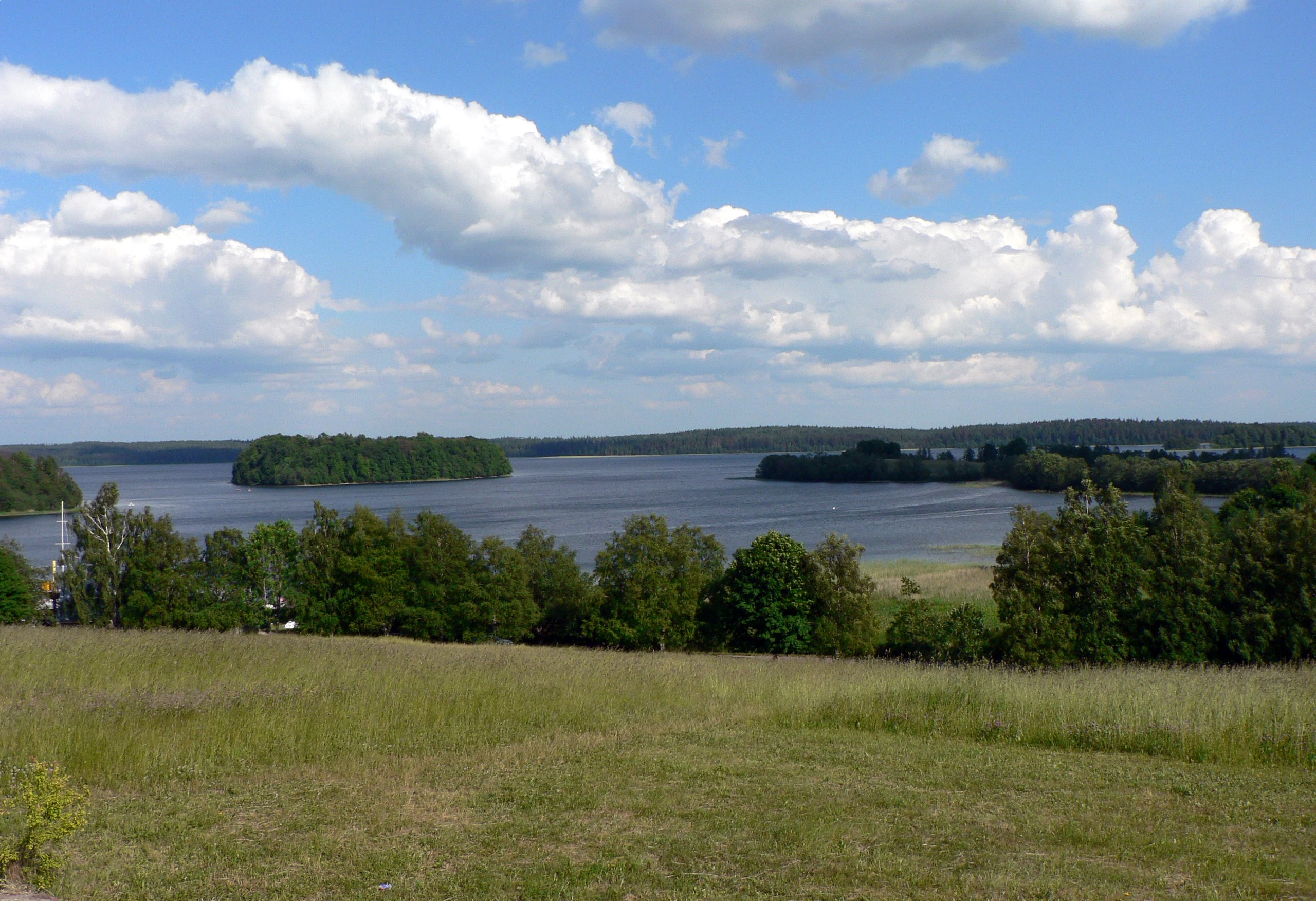
- Plateliai lake

- Location within Lithuania
- Interactive map of Žemaitija National Park
- Location: Lithuania
- Coordinates: 56°02′55″N 21°53′20″E
- Area: 217.54 km^{2} (83.99 sq mi)
- Established: 1991

Samogitia National Park or Žemaitija National Park is a national park in Lithuania. It is situated on the Samogitian Upland, 45 km from the Baltic Sea. Lakes cover more than 7% of its territory. Lake Plateliai (12.05 km^{2}, 47 m depth) is the largest lake in the park. The town of Plateliai, situated on the shore of the lake, is the seat of the park's administration and a popular tourist destination. The Park has Category II in the classification of the IUCN.

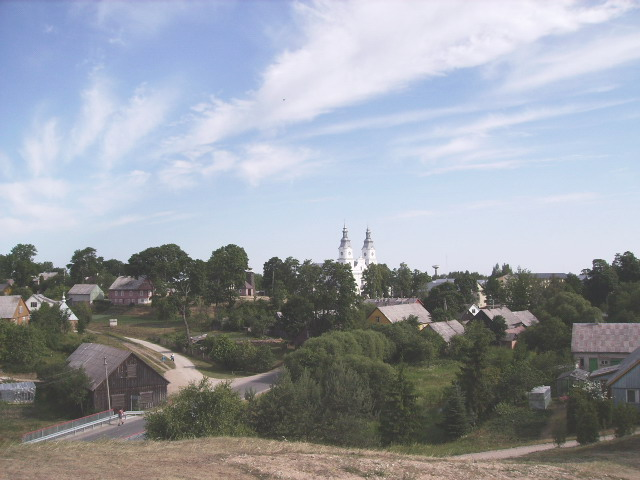
Žemaičių Kalvarija.

== Nature ==
The hilly terrain of the Samogitian Park was formed by the melting glacier about 12,000 years ago. The resulting hills are relatively high, about 150–190 meters. Lakes occupies more than 7%. park territories, the largest Samogitia Plateliai Lake is concentrated here, in addition to which there are 25 smaller lakes.

Forests occupy about 45 percent of the park. all areas. The forested wetlands of Plokštinė and Rukundžiai, the hydrographic complexes of Plateliai Lake, Laumalenka and Šilinė, the valleys of the Gardai esker, Babrungas and Mergupis rivers, Paburgė, Siberia, Pakastuva, Užpelkiai, Ertenis and Paparčiai wetlands are especially valuable for science. and Pailgis forests and Juodupis wetlands ecosystems, rare plants and animals. Rare Atlantic salmon and freshwater whitefish Coregonus albula and Coregonus lavaretus breed in Plateliai Lake.

Grows to 7.2 m in volume, 2.1 m in diameter and 34 m in height Witch Ash. Next to the park, in the village of Puokė, lies the largest boulder in Lithuania, the Barstyčiai stone. Wolves and lynxes found home here. Nine species of bats fly at night.

== See also ==
- List of national parks in the Baltics

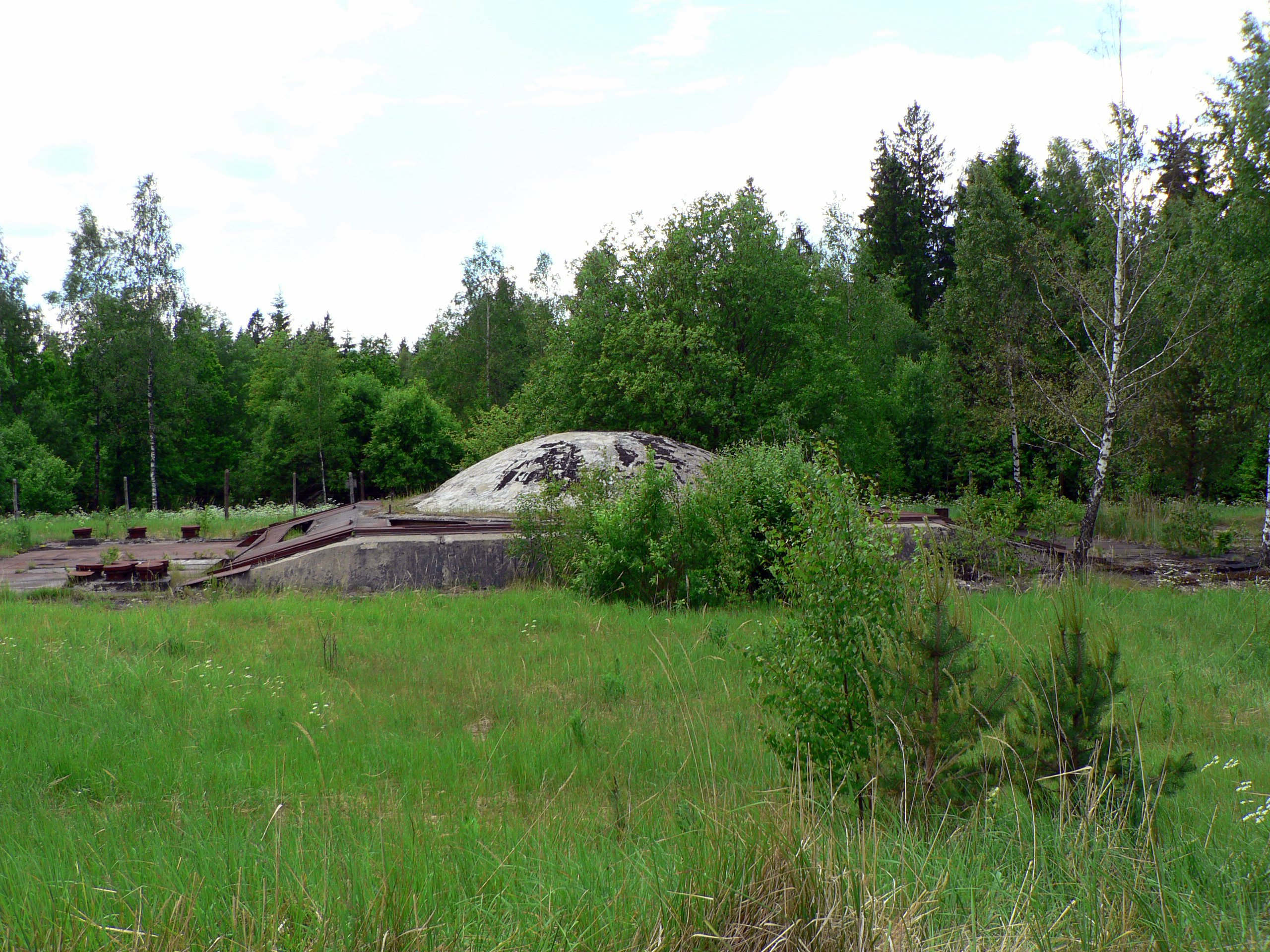
The underground R-12U nuclear missile launching silo in Plokštinė base
