= Plateliai =

Town in Samogitia, Lithuania

Coordinates: 56°03′N 21°49′E

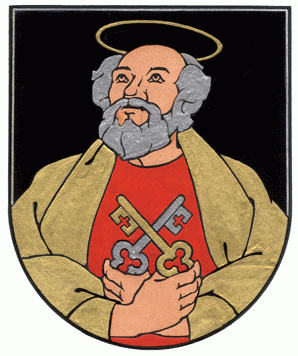
Plateliai coat of arms

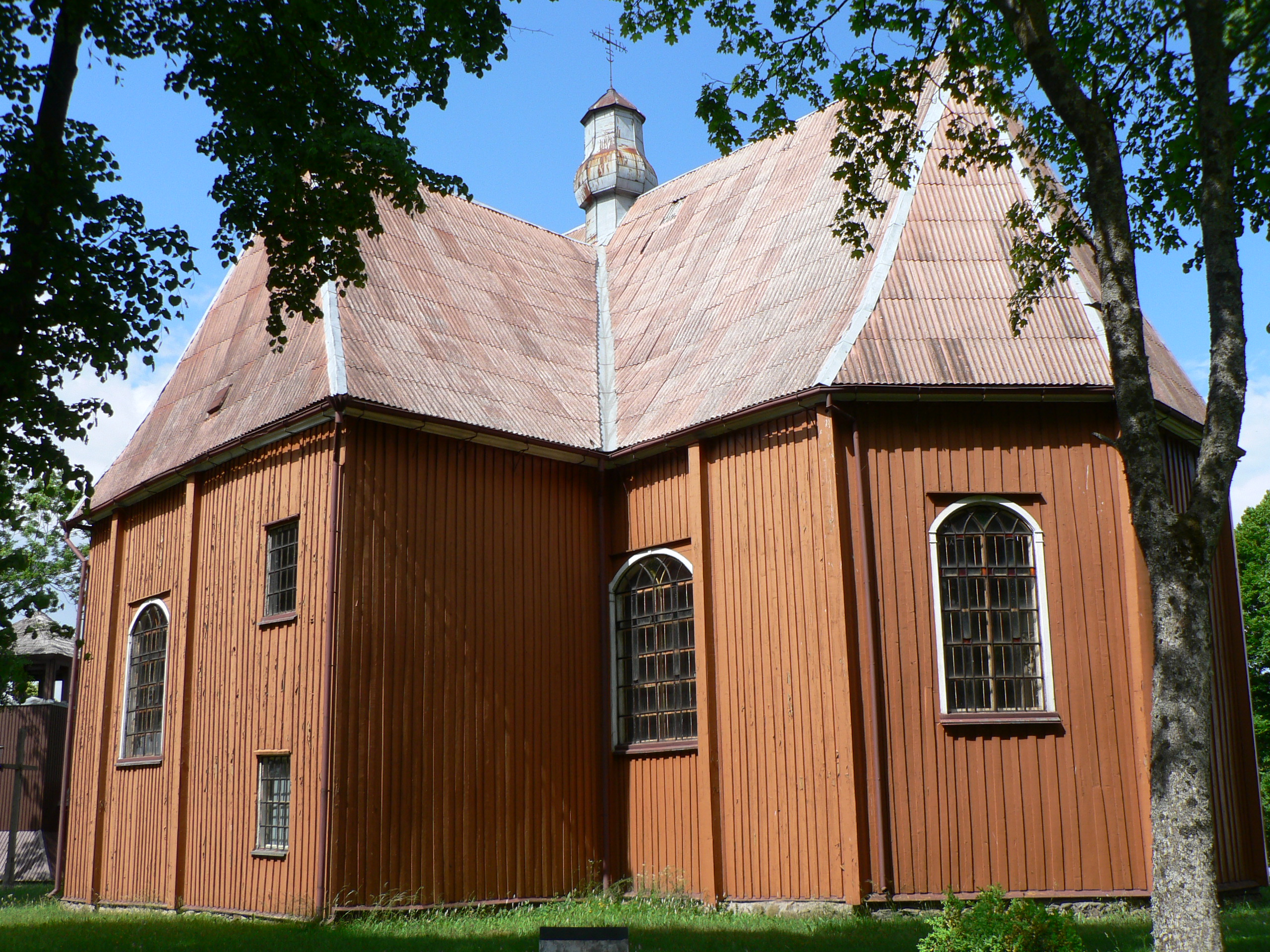
St. Peter and Paul church in Plateliai, 1744

Plateliai (Samogitian: Platelē; Polish: Płótele) is a town in Samogitia, Lithuania. It is situated on the west bank of Lake Plateliai, the largest lake in Samogitia. The town has a population of about 1,100 people and is the center of an elderate in Plungė district municipality. It is the administrative center of the Žemaitija National Park. The town is a popular resort in Samogitia and attracts many tourists.

== History ==
The wooden St. Peter and Paul church of Plateliai was built in 1744 by Jan Wojtkiewicz. The Choiseul de Gouffier palace was destroyed at the end of World War II but the 40 hectare park remained.

=== Jewish community ===
Having settled in Plateliai at the end of the 18th century, Jews were employed in small commerce, craftsmanship and fishing in the lake bordering the town. There was a synagogue in the town, but no Jewish school or any other Jewish public institutions. From the end of the 19th century, the Jews of Plateliai started gradually emigrating to America and South Africa, and the flow continued into the interwar period, propelled by a huge fire that devastated half of the town in 1923. The disaster worsened the economic situation of the Jews. Families usually maintained vegetable gardens beside their houses, which helped them survive. Of 150 Jews that lived in Plateliai in 1923, only about a hundred remained in 1940.

Three dozen Jewish men from Plateliai were arrested about a week after the German invasion, on the second day of the war. While they were confined in the synagogue and forced to do hard physical labor, Jewish women and children were forced to work for the farmers around the town as auxiliary labor force. The first shooting took place in the Laumalenka forest, 4 km south of the town, in the beginning of July 1941, when up to ten Jewish men were shot. The rest of the Jewish men were executed in mid-July at the foot of Mount Bokštikalnis, 0,5 km west of the town. After the execution of men, 70 women, children and the elderly were placed in the synagogue and kept there until the end of August. They were shot and buried in a trench dug by residents of the town in the Laumalenka forest. In the same manner as the men before them, the women had to undress before being lined up at the edge of the pit and shot.
