= List of islands in the Baltic Sea =

This is a list of islands in the Baltic Sea. The Baltic Sea proper is bordered to the north by the Bothnian Sea and, further north, the Gulf of Bothnia, neither being part of the Baltic Sea proper. The eastern basins the Gulf of Finland and the Gulf of Riga are likewise not considered part of the Baltic Sea proper. Whether islands situated in, or on the borders to, these basins (Åland, Hailuoto and Kotlin) shall be included in the list is therefore a matter of definition.

The Danish islands Zealand (7,000 km² 2,200,000 people), Funen (2,984 km² 400,000 people), Als (312 km² 51,300 people), and Langeland (284 km² 13,300 people) lie in the Danish Straits connecting the Baltic Sea and the Kattegat.

== Listed by size ==
Name	Image	Area	Country
Gotland		2,994 km²	Sweden
Saaremaa		2,673 km²	Estonia
Öland		1,342 km²	Sweden
Lolland		1,243 km²	Denmark
Hiiumaa		989 km²	Estonia
Rügen		935 km²	Germany
Fasta Åland		685 km²	Finland
Bornholm		588 km²	Denmark
Kimitoön		560 km²	Finland
Falster		514 km²	Denmark
Usedom		445 km²	Germany and Poland
Wolin		265 km²	Poland
Møn		218 km²	Denmark
Hailuoto		201 km²	Finland
Muhu		198 km²	Estonia
Fehmarn		185 km²	Germany
Värmdö		181 km²	Sweden

== By population ==
Name	Image	Population	Country
Usedom		76,500	Poland and Germany
Rügen		73,000	Germany
Lolland		68,224	Denmark
Gotland		57,381	Sweden
Värmdö		48,000	Sweden
Bornholm		44,100	Denmark
Falster		43,537	Denmark
Lidingö		43,400	Sweden
Kotlin		42,800	Russia
Saaremaa		40,312	Estonia
Öland		23,000	Sweden
Fasta Åland		22,000	Finland
Wolin		17,000	Poland
Fehmarn		14,000	Germany
Møn		12,000	Denmark
Hiiumaa		8,400	Estonia
Muhu		1,822	Estonia

== See also ==
- List of islands of Denmark
- List of islands of Estonia
- List of islands of Finland
- List of islands of Germany
- List of islands of Lithuania
- List of islands of Poland
- List of islands of Russia
- List of islands of Sweden
- List of islands
