= Plateliai Lake =

Lake in Lithuania

Lake Plateliai
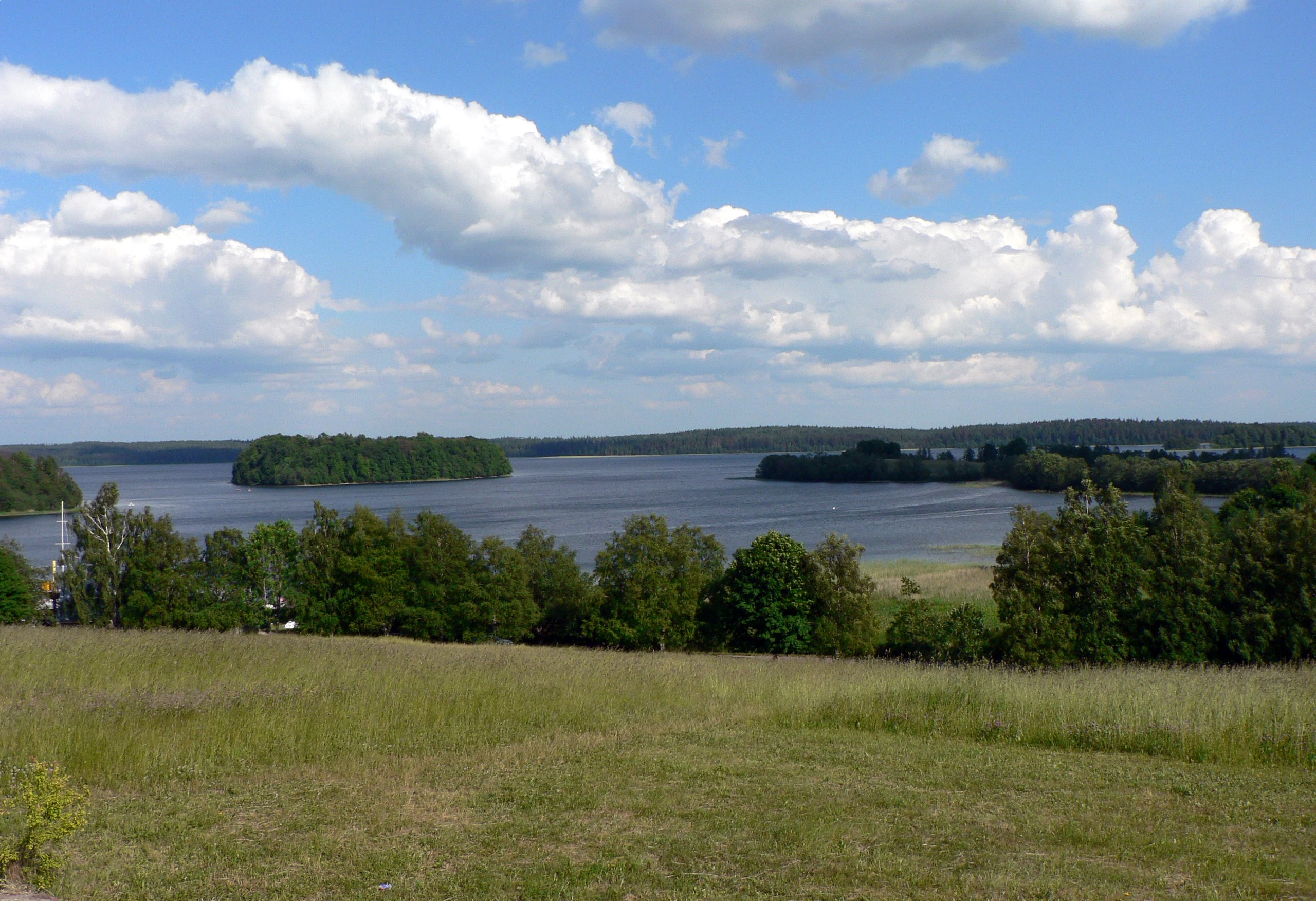

- Location within Lithuania
- Location: Samogitia
- Coordinates: 56°2′50″N 21°51′23″E
- Basin countries: Lithuania
- Surface area: 12 km^{2} (4.6 mi^{2})
- Max. depth: 49 m (161 ft)
- Islands: 7 (Castle Island)
- Settlements: Plateliai

Lake Plateliai (Samogitian dialect: Plateliu ežers) is the biggest lake in Samogitia and 9th biggest in Lithuania. It is the central attraction in the Žemaitija National Park. It covers about 12 square kilometres (4.6 sq mi) and reaches up to 49 metres (161 ft) in depth. It has seven islands, one of them housed a castle and now is called Castle Island. Archeologists found remains of two castles and think it might be the Queen Bona castle. The lake has both diving and yacht clubs. Plateliai town is located on the west bank of the lake.

== Events and attractions ==
Lake Plateliai is famous for several events. It has hosted the rock music festival Roko naktys (English: Nights of Rock) since 2002. However, it seems the festival will have to relocate as the little town cannot accommodate more than 4,000 people attending the event. For 25 years swimmers have competed in a marathon in the lake. In 2006, a record number of people participated: 21 people swam a distance of 3.5 km and 154 swam 1.8 km.

The Cold War Museum was established in the Plokštinė missile base, located in the forest not far from the lake.

== Archaeology ==
The lake is one of the most interesting sites for underwater archeology. Scientists think that the water level was much lower years ago and that some islands are now underwater. For example, in 2002 divers found a big stone with human-made markings, that resemble the letter L. The stone was surrounded by smaller stones and a hypothesis was raised that it was a sacred place for the pagans. In 2002, on the bottom of the lake archeologists found three boats, about 5.5 meters in length, dated to the times of Vytautas the Great.

== Islands ==
The lake has seven islands.

Calves' Island (Lithuanian: Veršių sala) is the third largest island and is located in the northern part of the lake. It is said that a local farmer started taking his calves to graze on the island, thus giving the island its name. Corydalis cava which is an endangered species in Lithuania grows on the island.

Ubagsalė is the fifth largest island. It is located in the northern part of the lake close to the shoreline. The name is associated with the stories about beggars (Lithuanian: ubagai) who liked to party on the island when returning from the Great Žemaičių Kalvarija Festival.

== See also ==
- Lakes of Lithuania
