= Curonian Lagoon =

Freshwater lagoon separated from the Baltic Sea by the Curonian Spit

- Kuršių marios (Lithuanian); Куршский залив (Russian)
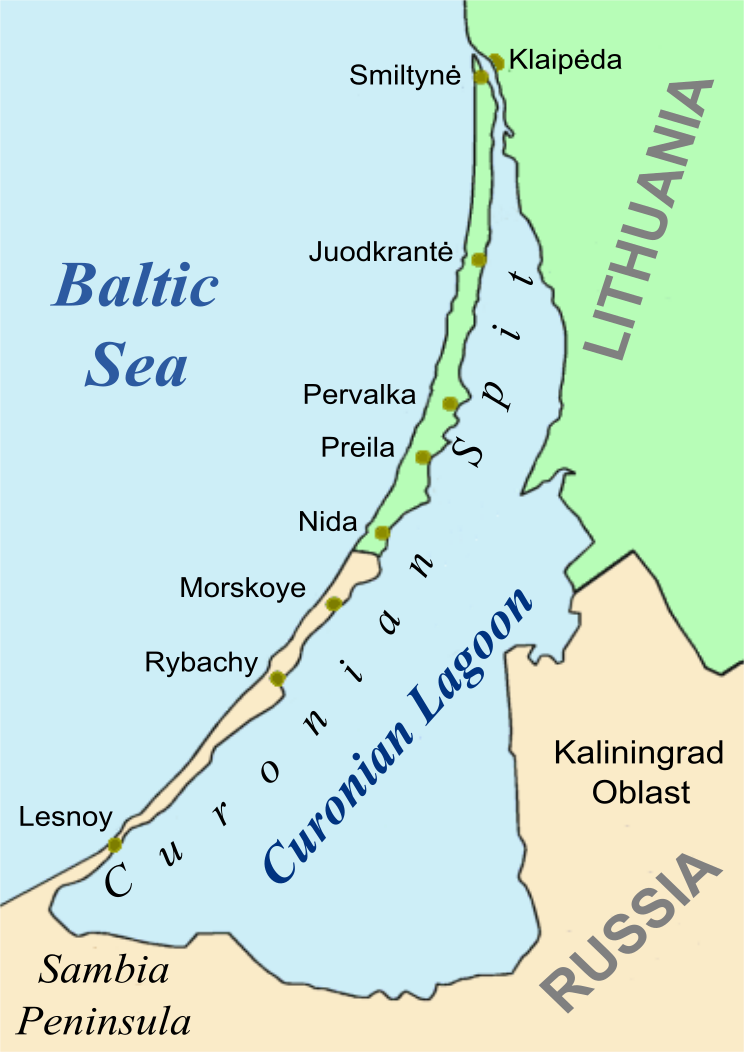
- Map of the Curonian Spit and Lagoon

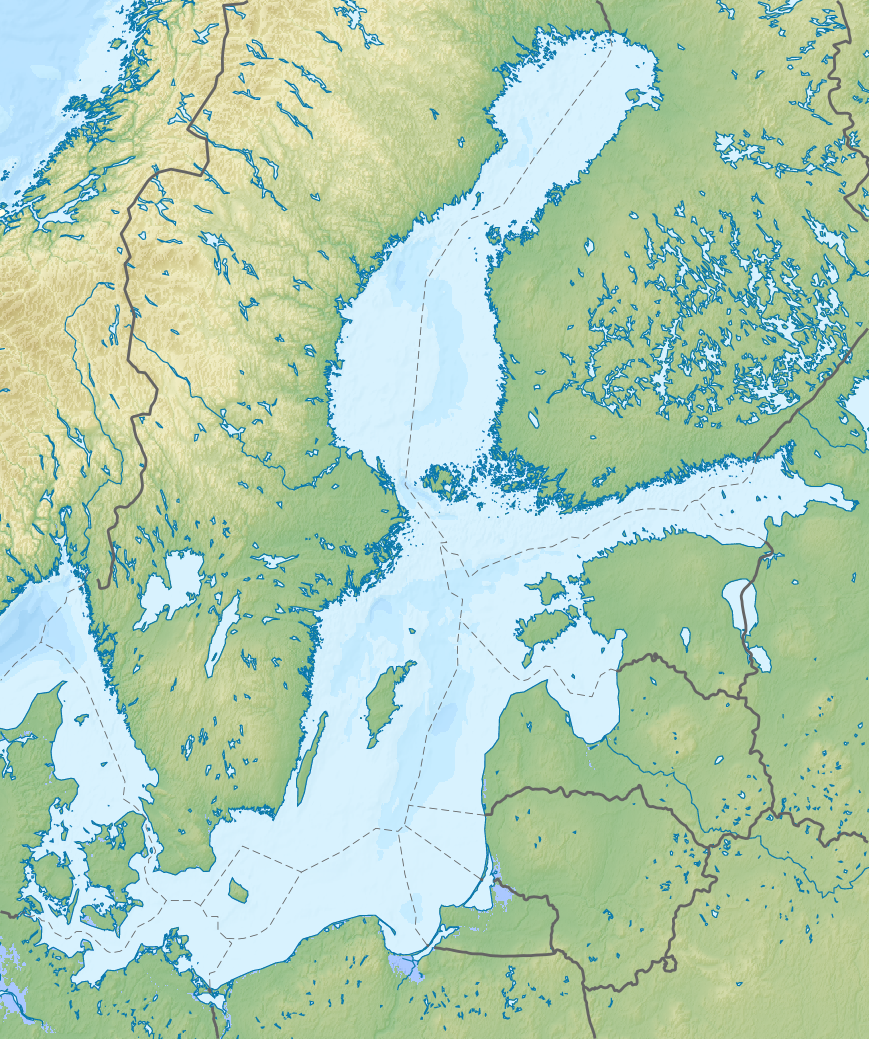
- Location within Lithuania Location within Baltic Sea Location within Europe
- Location: Lithuania, Russia
- Coordinates: 55°05′34″N 20°54′59″E
- Type: Lagoon
- Primary inflows: Neman
- Max. length: 98 km (61 mi)
- Max. width: 46 km (29 mi)
- Surface area: 1,619 km^{2} (625 sq mi)
- Average depth: 3.8 m (12 ft)
- Max. depth: 5.8 m (19 ft)

The Curonian Lagoon (or Bay, Gulf; Lithuanian: Kuršių marios, German: Kurisches Haff, Prussian: Kursjanmari, Russian: Куршский залив) is a freshwater lagoon separated from the Baltic Sea by the Curonian Spit. Its surface area is 1,619 square kilometers (625 sq mi). The Neman River (Lithuanian: Nemunas) supplies about 90% of its inflows; its watershed consists of about 100,450 square kilometres in Lithuania and Russia's Kaliningrad Oblast.

== Human history ==
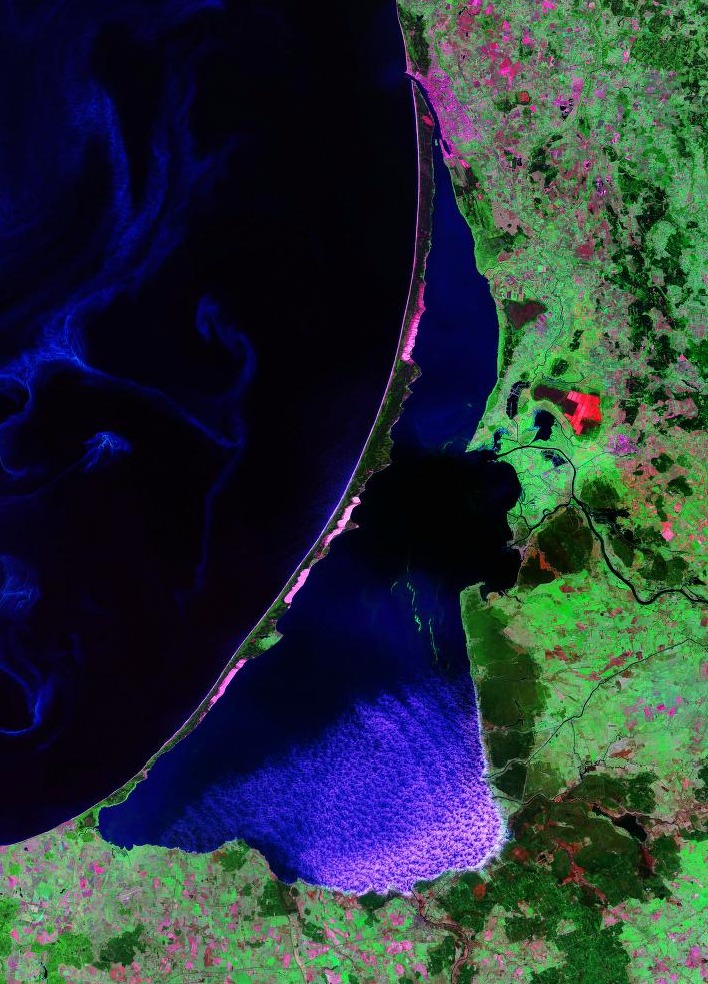
NASA's Landsat satellite image of Curonian Lagoon

In the 13th century, the area around the lagoon was part of the ancestral lands of the Baltic Curonians and Old Prussians. Later, it bordered the historical region of Lithuania Minor. At the northern end of the Spit, the Klaipėda Strait connects the lagoon to the Baltic Sea, and the place was chosen by the Teutonic Knights in 1252 to found Memelburg Castle and the city of Klaipėda. In 1454, King and Grand Duke Casimir IV Jagiellon incorporated the region into the Kingdom of Poland upon the request of the anti-Teutonic Prussian Confederation. After the subsequent Thirteen Years' War (1454–1466) the Teutonic Knights regained authority over the region as a fief of the Polish Crown. From the 18th century, it formed part of the Kingdom of Prussia, and from 1871 also Germany. After 1923, the Klaipėda Region in the north passed to Lithuania (occupied by Germany in 1939–45), whereas the remainder fell to the Soviet Union following World War II.

As the new interwar border, the river that flows into the Curonian Lagoon near Rusnė was chosen. The river's lower 120 km in Germany were called die Memel by Germans, while the upper part located in Lithuania was known as Nemunas River. The border also separated the peninsula near the small holiday resort of Nida, Lithuania. From 1939 to 1945, the Lithuanian part was occupied by Germany, and the southern part of the spit and the lagoon remained in Germany until 1945.

This border is now the border between Lithuania and Russia, as after World War II, the southern end of the Spit and the German area south of the river became part of an exclave of Russia called Kaliningrad Oblast.

The nearly extinct ethnic group, the Kursenieki, lived in the surrounding area.

== Natural history and ecology ==
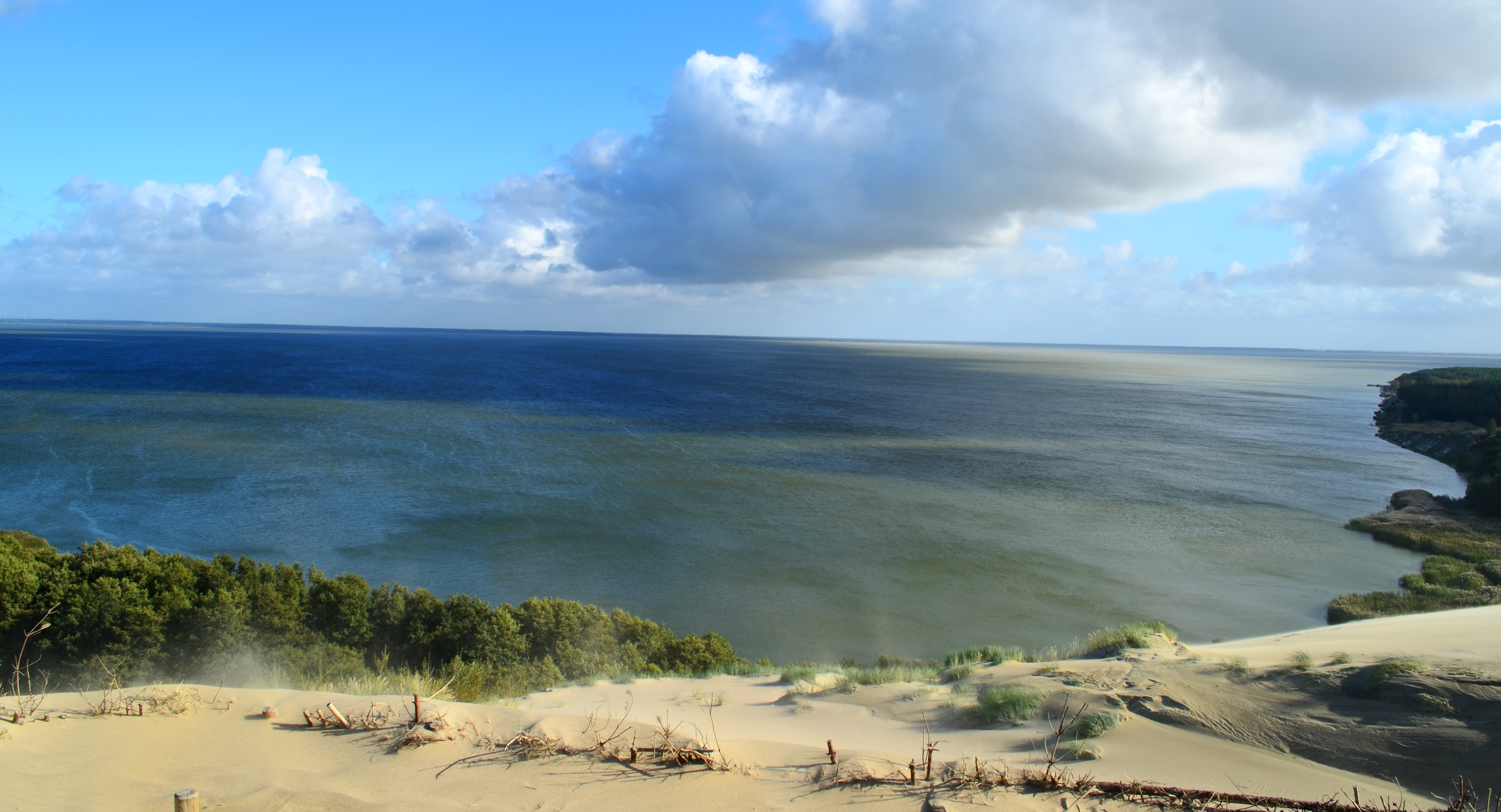
View from the Agila dune in Neringa

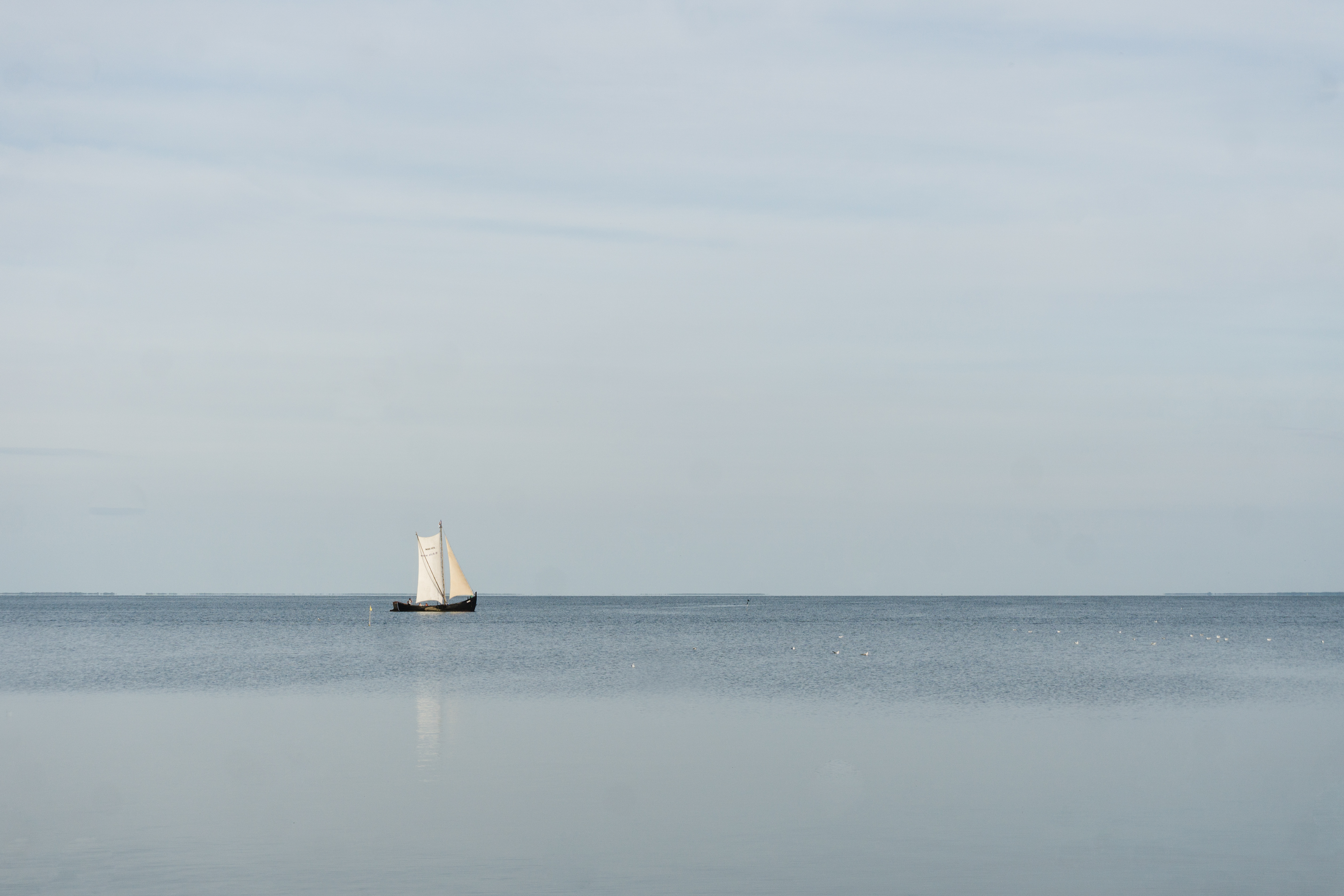
Sailing boat in the Curonian Lagoon

The lagoon, formed about 7,000 years BCE, is a freshwater lagoon. Water depths average 3.8 metres (12 ft). It is highly biodiverse, although troubled by water pollution. The presence of algal blooms was confirmed in the 2000s.

== See also ==
- Nemunas Delta
- Vistula Lagoon
