= Nemunas Delta =

River delta in Lithuania

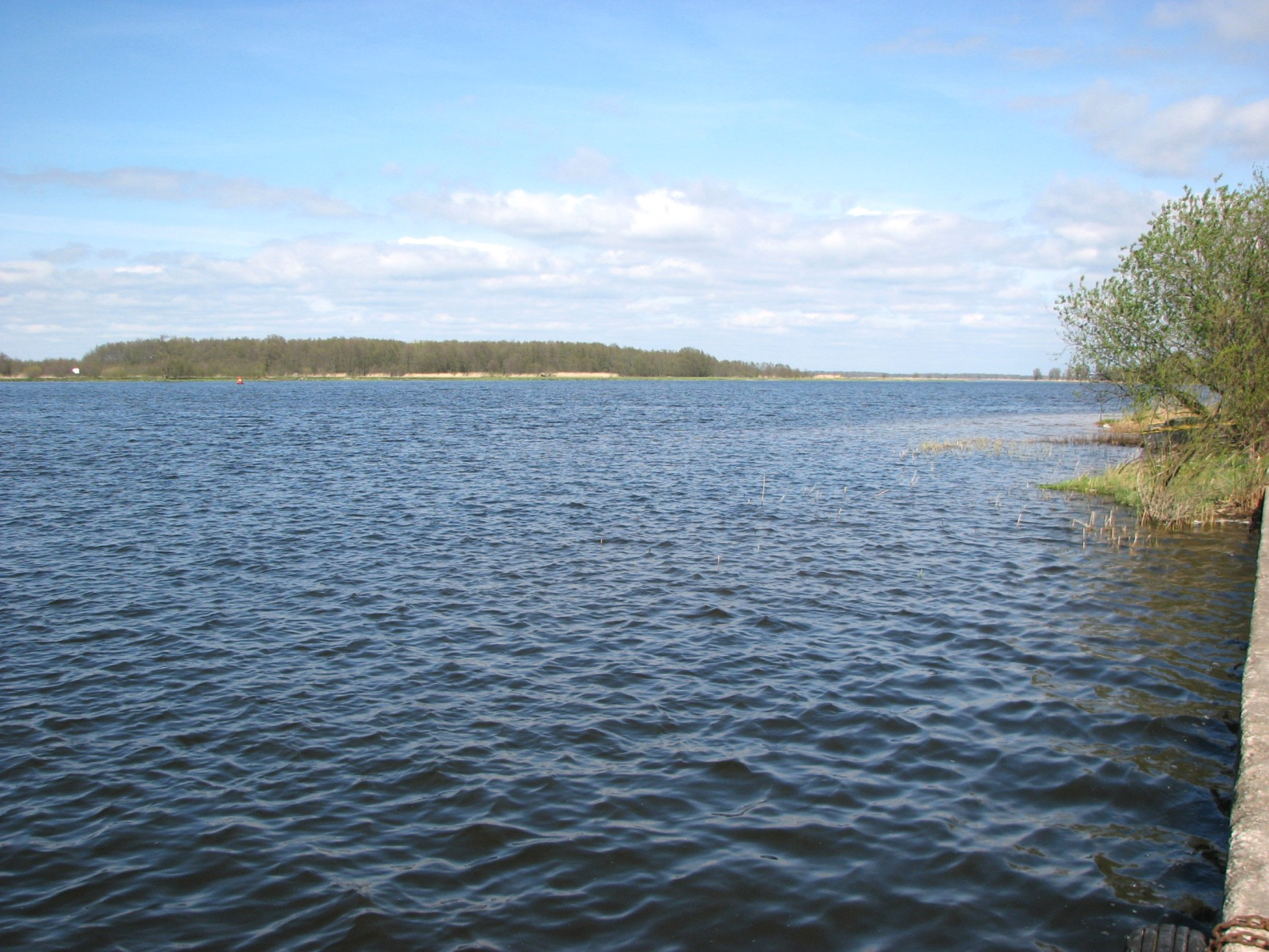
- Atmata River
- Interactive map of Nemunas Delta
- Location: Lithuania
- Area: 28,952 ha (71,540 acres)

Ramsar Wetland
- Designated: 20 August 1993
- Reference no.: 629

Nemunas Delta is the Lithuanian name for the Neman (Nemunas) River Delta, in Lithuania. Prior to post-World War II border changes, it was known in German as the Memel Niederung, as the Neman was for centuries called the Memel in German.

When it reaches the Baltic Sea, the Neman splits into a maze of river branches and canals, forming polders and wetlands that make it a very attractive destination for eco-tourism. The four main distributaries are Atmata, Pakalnė, Skirvytė and Gilija. In the centre of the delta lies Lithuania's largest island, Rusnė Island (5 km²), and its eponymous village. Although it is the largest human settlement in the delta, its population is only about 2,500.

== Delta ==
The Nemunas Delta wetlands are considered globally significant and are protected under the Ramsar Convention. To safeguard the delta's wildlife and facilitate research, the Nemunas Delta Regional Park was created in 1992. It covers 239.5 km² and consists of 14 reserves and one water reservoir. About 20% of the area is covered by water. Since 1999, the Lithuanian Society of Ornithologists and the Nemunas Delta Regional Park Administration have been organizing bird counts every October. The rally is an open, international, and non-professional attempt to tally as many bird species as possible. Bird counts assist in identifying environmental threats to the well-being of birds or, conversely, in assessing the outcomes of environmental management initiatives intended to ensure the survival of at-risk species or encourage the breeding of species for aesthetic or ecological reasons. The delta undergoes annual flooding, but the greatest threats to its integrity are posed by pollution, agriculture, the fishing industry, and tourism.

The delta hosts many rare varieties of birds during the spring breeding season (the total reported number of species is about 200; about 40 species are listed in the Lithuanian Red Book of Endangered Species). It is also the most important layover for migrating birds in Lithuania. Millions of birds and hundreds of species travel through this area each year, including some internationally endangered species: the white-tailed eagle, the barnacle goose, cranes, dunlins and aquatic warblers. The principal research facilities are located in Ventė Cape (Lithuanian: Ventės ragas, sometimes referred to as the Ventė Peninsula). One of the first bird ringing stations in Europe was opened there in 1929 by a Lithuanian zoologist, Tadas Ivanauskas. Birds ringed at the Cape have been found migrating to Iran, Egypt and even to the Republic of South Africa.

Mammals found in the delta include fox, beaver, elk, wild boar and otter.

Another of the delta's special features is Lake Krokų Lanka (near where the Nemunas debouches), which formed when the river's outwash separated it from the Curonian Lagoon. It is the largest lake in the delta region, covering 7.93 km², and the only lake of marine origin in Lithuania.

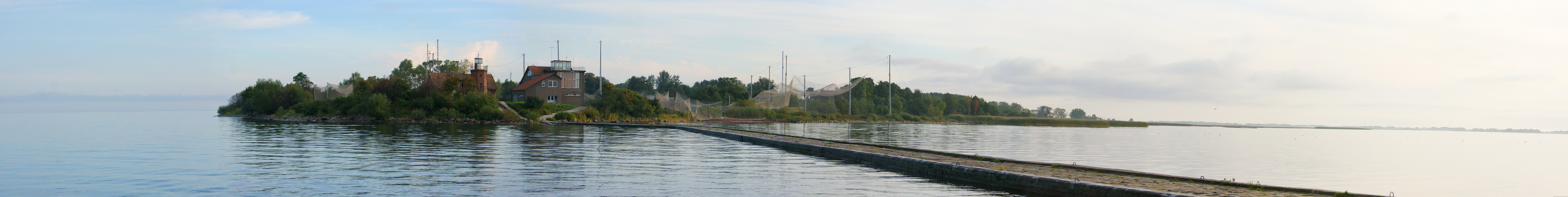
Ventė Cape, formerly Windenburg, in autumn morning, Heligoland traps visible

== Maps ==
- Map of Nemunas Delta Regional Park
- Map of Nemunas Delta
- Nemunas Delta is at coordinates 55°18′00″N 21°00′00″E
