= List of minor planets: 859001–860000 =

The following is a partial list of minor planets, running from minor-planet number 859001 through 860000, inclusive. The primary data for this and other partial lists is based on JPL's "Small-Body Orbital Elements" and data available from the Minor Planet Center. Critical list information is also provided by the MPC, unless otherwise specified from Lowell Observatory. A detailed description of the table's columns and additional sources are given on the main page including a complete list of every page in this series, and a statistical break-up on the dynamical classification of minor planets.

Also see the summary list of all named bodies in numerical and alphabetical order, and the corresponding naming citations for the number range of this particular list. New namings may only be added to this list after official publication, as the preannouncement of names is condemned by the Working Group for Small Bodies Nomenclature of the International Astronomical Union.

Near-Earth obj.	MBA (inner)	MBA (outer)	Centaur
Mars-crosser	MBA (middle)	Jupiter trojan	Trans-Neptunian obj.
Unclassified

== 859001–859100 ==
Designation			Discovery			Properties		Ref
Permanent	Provisional	Named after	Date	Site	Discoverer(s)	Category	Diam.	Ref
859001	2013 FP_{11}	—	March 17, 2013	Mount Lemmon	Mount Lemmon Survey	·	1.3 km	MPC · JPL
859002	2013 FA_{14}	—	December 28, 2012	Haleakala	Pan-STARRS 1	·	700 m	MPC · JPL
859003	2013 FW_{23}	—	March 17, 2013	Kitt Peak	Spacewatch	NYS	900 m	MPC · JPL
859004	2013 FE_{28}	—	February 14, 2013	Haleakala	Pan-STARRS 1	·	410 m	MPC · JPL
859005	2013 FY_{29}	—	March 19, 2013	Haleakala	Pan-STARRS 1	·	1.5 km	MPC · JPL
859006	2013 FR_{30}	—	March 18, 2013	Mount Lemmon	Mount Lemmon Survey	·	550 m	MPC · JPL
859007	2013 FU_{30}	—	March 17, 2013	Mount Lemmon	Mount Lemmon Survey	·	1.6 km	MPC · JPL
859008	2013 FY_{30}	—	March 19, 2013	Haleakala	Pan-STARRS 1	·	1.7 km	MPC · JPL
859009	2013 FE_{32}	—	March 16, 2013	Mount Lemmon	Mount Lemmon Survey	·	1.2 km	MPC · JPL
859010	2013 FQ_{32}	—	March 19, 2013	Haleakala	Pan-STARRS 1	NYS	720 m	MPC · JPL
859011	2013 FK_{33}	—	March 19, 2013	Haleakala	Pan-STARRS 1	EOS	1.2 km	MPC · JPL
859012	2013 FB_{34}	—	March 18, 2013	Kitt Peak	Spacewatch	NYS	920 m	MPC · JPL
859013	2013 FM_{34}	—	March 17, 2013	Mount Lemmon	Mount Lemmon Survey	·	1.4 km	MPC · JPL
859014	2013 FR_{34}	—	March 23, 2013	Mount Lemmon	Mount Lemmon Survey	·	870 m	MPC · JPL
859015	2013 FT_{34}	—	March 18, 2013	Mount Lemmon	Mount Lemmon Survey	·	960 m	MPC · JPL
859016	2013 FX_{35}	—	March 19, 2013	Haleakala	Pan-STARRS 1	·	1.4 km	MPC · JPL
859017	2013 FQ_{36}	—	March 18, 2013	Mount Lemmon	Mount Lemmon Survey	·	500 m	MPC · JPL
859018	2013 FT_{37}	—	March 19, 2013	Haleakala	Pan-STARRS 1	·	700 m	MPC · JPL
859019	2013 FM_{38}	—	March 19, 2013	Haleakala	Pan-STARRS 1	MAS	590 m	MPC · JPL
859020	2013 FQ_{38}	—	March 18, 2013	Kitt Peak	Spacewatch	·	2.1 km	MPC · JPL
859021	2013 FG_{39}	—	March 18, 2013	Mount Lemmon	Mount Lemmon Survey	·	1.6 km	MPC · JPL
859022	2013 FA_{40}	—	March 19, 2013	Haleakala	Pan-STARRS 1	·	1.4 km	MPC · JPL
859023	2013 FN_{40}	—	March 18, 2013	Mount Lemmon	Mount Lemmon Survey	·	1.5 km	MPC · JPL
859024	2013 FP_{41}	—	March 19, 2013	Haleakala	Pan-STARRS 1	THM	1.5 km	MPC · JPL
859025	2013 FB_{45}	—	March 19, 2013	Haleakala	Pan-STARRS 1	·	1.6 km	MPC · JPL
859026	2013 GK	—	March 11, 2013	Mount Lemmon	Mount Lemmon Survey	·	600 m	MPC · JPL
859027	2013 GX	—	February 29, 2000	Socorro	LINEAR	·	1.1 km	MPC · JPL
859028	2013 GU_{2}	—	February 21, 2013	Haleakala	Pan-STARRS 1	·	700 m	MPC · JPL
859029	2013 GU_{5}	—	April 30, 2006	Kitt Peak	Spacewatch	·	620 m	MPC · JPL
859030	2013 GN_{11}	—	June 18, 2010	Mount Lemmon	Mount Lemmon Survey	·	510 m	MPC · JPL
859031	2013 GW_{13}	—	March 23, 2009	Mount Lemmon	Mount Lemmon Survey	·	970 m	MPC · JPL
859032	2013 GX_{17}	—	September 23, 2011	Kitt Peak	Spacewatch	H	320 m	MPC · JPL
859033	2013 GQ_{20}	—	March 15, 2013	Kitt Peak	Spacewatch	JUN	710 m	MPC · JPL
859034	2013 GT_{22}	—	March 5, 2013	Haleakala	Pan-STARRS 1	·	460 m	MPC · JPL
859035	2013 GL_{26}	—	March 5, 2013	Haleakala	Pan-STARRS 1	T_{j} (2.98)	2.1 km	MPC · JPL
859036	2013 GX_{30}	—	February 8, 2008	Mount Lemmon	Mount Lemmon Survey	·	1.7 km	MPC · JPL
859037	2013 GG_{32}	—	March 14, 2013	Kitt Peak	Spacewatch	·	1.5 km	MPC · JPL
859038	2013 GQ_{32}	—	March 18, 2013	Kitt Peak	Spacewatch	NYS	730 m	MPC · JPL
859039	2013 GU_{33}	—	April 7, 2013	Palomar	Palomar Transient Factory	H	410 m	MPC · JPL
859040	2013 GW_{35}	—	April 7, 2013	Mount Lemmon	Mount Lemmon Survey	·	1.6 km	MPC · JPL
859041	2013 GQ_{36}	—	January 29, 2009	Kitt Peak	Spacewatch	·	740 m	MPC · JPL
859042	2013 GN_{42}	—	March 18, 2013	Kitt Peak	Spacewatch	·	1.9 km	MPC · JPL
859043	2013 GD_{44}	—	February 11, 2012	Mount Lemmon	Mount Lemmon Survey	3:2 · SHU	3.9 km	MPC · JPL
859044	2013 GC_{45}	—	September 18, 2010	Mount Lemmon	Mount Lemmon Survey	MAR	740 m	MPC · JPL
859045	2013 GZ_{45}	—	April 1, 2013	Mount Lemmon	Mount Lemmon Survey	·	480 m	MPC · JPL
859046	2013 GA_{47}	—	March 25, 2006	Kitt Peak	Spacewatch	NYS	800 m	MPC · JPL
859047	2013 GS_{47}	—	March 18, 2013	Kitt Peak	Spacewatch	·	1.0 km	MPC · JPL
859048	2013 GF_{48}	—	April 1, 2013	Mount Lemmon	Mount Lemmon Survey	·	1.6 km	MPC · JPL
859049	2013 GK_{48}	—	March 19, 2013	Haleakala	Pan-STARRS 1	·	780 m	MPC · JPL
859050	2013 GY_{48}	—	March 19, 2013	Haleakala	Pan-STARRS 1	·	2.2 km	MPC · JPL
859051	2013 GC_{50}	—	April 7, 2013	Kitt Peak	Spacewatch	PHO	710 m	MPC · JPL
859052	2013 GS_{52}	—	April 10, 2013	Haleakala	Pan-STARRS 1	MAS	560 m	MPC · JPL
859053	2013 GX_{55}	—	March 29, 2008	Kitt Peak	Spacewatch	·	1.4 km	MPC · JPL
859054	2013 GP_{62}	—	March 16, 2013	Kitt Peak	Spacewatch	H	290 m	MPC · JPL
859055	2013 GS_{63}	—	March 11, 2013	Kitt Peak	Spacewatch	H	470 m	MPC · JPL
859056	2013 GS_{65}	—	April 10, 2013	Haleakala	Pan-STARRS 1	·	750 m	MPC · JPL
859057	2013 GP_{67}	—	April 7, 2013	La Silla	La Silla	·	720 m	MPC · JPL
859058	2013 GG_{70}	—	March 12, 2013	Mount Lemmon	Mount Lemmon Survey	·	1.5 km	MPC · JPL
859059	2013 GX_{70}	—	March 16, 2013	Catalina	CSS	·	1.4 km	MPC · JPL
859060	2013 GY_{70}	—	April 10, 2013	Palomar	Palomar Transient Factory	PHO	670 m	MPC · JPL
859061	2013 GY_{73}	—	April 10, 2013	Mount Lemmon	Mount Lemmon Survey	AMO	560 m	MPC · JPL
859062	2013 GZ_{76}	—	March 5, 2013	Mount Lemmon	Mount Lemmon Survey	·	810 m	MPC · JPL
859063	2013 GJ_{78}	—	April 12, 2013	Mount Lemmon	Mount Lemmon Survey	·	1.7 km	MPC · JPL
859064	2013 GL_{80}	—	September 19, 2011	Haleakala	Pan-STARRS 1	H	340 m	MPC · JPL
859065	2013 GM_{84}	—	April 11, 2013	Piszkéstető	K. Sárneczky	·	1.2 km	MPC · JPL
859066	2013 GC_{86}	—	January 27, 2007	Mount Lemmon	Mount Lemmon Survey	·	1.9 km	MPC · JPL
859067	2013 GA_{88}	—	March 18, 2013	Kitt Peak	Spacewatch	·	960 m	MPC · JPL
859068	2013 GE_{90}	—	April 13, 2013	Kitt Peak	Spacewatch	(895)	2.5 km	MPC · JPL
859069	2013 GZ_{99}	—	September 9, 2010	Kitt Peak	Spacewatch	PHO	800 m	MPC · JPL
859070	2013 GK_{100}	—	April 12, 2013	Haleakala	Pan-STARRS 1	·	1.2 km	MPC · JPL
859071	2013 GW_{106}	—	April 19, 2006	Mount Lemmon	Mount Lemmon Survey	·	510 m	MPC · JPL
859072	2013 GE_{109}	—	March 17, 2013	Mount Lemmon	Mount Lemmon Survey	·	1.2 km	MPC · JPL
859073	2013 GJ_{118}	—	September 16, 2003	Kitt Peak	Spacewatch	NYS	680 m	MPC · JPL
859074	2013 GM_{118}	—	April 6, 2013	Mount Lemmon	Mount Lemmon Survey	·	670 m	MPC · JPL
859075	2013 GN_{118}	—	April 6, 2013	Mount Lemmon	Mount Lemmon Survey	·	1.4 km	MPC · JPL
859076	2013 GZ_{119}	—	April 7, 2013	Mount Lemmon	Mount Lemmon Survey	·	530 m	MPC · JPL
859077	2013 GK_{121}	—	April 8, 2013	Mount Lemmon	Mount Lemmon Survey	·	1.7 km	MPC · JPL
859078	2013 GD_{123}	—	September 21, 2009	Kitt Peak	Spacewatch	·	2.3 km	MPC · JPL
859079	2013 GT_{123}	—	March 15, 2013	Mount Lemmon	Mount Lemmon Survey	·	790 m	MPC · JPL
859080	2013 GQ_{125}	—	April 11, 2013	Mount Lemmon	Mount Lemmon Survey	PHO	580 m	MPC · JPL
859081	2013 GX_{126}	—	April 13, 2013	Haleakala	Pan-STARRS 1	·	1.3 km	MPC · JPL
859082	2013 GB_{127}	—	April 13, 2013	Haleakala	Pan-STARRS 1	H	410 m	MPC · JPL
859083	2013 GT_{129}	—	April 8, 2013	Palomar	Palomar Transient Factory	·	1.5 km	MPC · JPL
859084	2013 GO_{134}	—	May 7, 2008	Mount Lemmon	Mount Lemmon Survey	·	1.8 km	MPC · JPL
859085	2013 GE_{135}	—	April 28, 2008	Kitt Peak	Spacewatch	·	1.4 km	MPC · JPL
859086	2013 GR_{139}	—	February 14, 2009	Mount Lemmon	Mount Lemmon Survey	·	910 m	MPC · JPL
859087	2013 GD_{140}	—	April 2, 2013	Mount Lemmon	Mount Lemmon Survey	·	1.1 km	MPC · JPL
859088	2013 GH_{141}	—	April 15, 2013	Haleakala	Pan-STARRS 1	·	1 km	MPC · JPL
859089	2013 GE_{142}	—	April 10, 2013	Kitt Peak	Spacewatch	·	550 m	MPC · JPL
859090	2013 GQ_{143}	—	April 15, 2013	Haleakala	Pan-STARRS 1	·	960 m	MPC · JPL
859091	2013 GR_{143}	—	June 20, 2010	Mount Lemmon	Mount Lemmon Survey	·	540 m	MPC · JPL
859092	2013 GH_{144}	—	April 15, 2013	Haleakala	Pan-STARRS 1	EOS	1.4 km	MPC · JPL
859093	2013 GQ_{144}	—	April 13, 2013	Kitt Peak	Spacewatch	·	800 m	MPC · JPL
859094	2013 GT_{144}	—	April 13, 2013	Haleakala	Pan-STARRS 1	·	2.4 km	MPC · JPL
859095	2013 GC_{145}	—	April 10, 2013	Haleakala	Pan-STARRS 1	·	1.8 km	MPC · JPL
859096	2013 GT_{145}	—	April 15, 2013	Haleakala	Pan-STARRS 1	PHO	660 m	MPC · JPL
859097	2013 GS_{147}	—	April 10, 2013	Haleakala	Pan-STARRS 1	·	940 m	MPC · JPL
859098	2013 GZ_{147}	—	November 22, 2015	Mount Lemmon	Mount Lemmon Survey	·	1.2 km	MPC · JPL
859099	2013 GU_{148}	—	April 12, 2013	Haleakala	Pan-STARRS 1	H	360 m	MPC · JPL
859100	2013 GT_{149}	—	September 18, 2015	Mount Lemmon	Mount Lemmon Survey	·	2.0 km	MPC · JPL

== 859101–859200 ==
back to top

Designation			Discovery			Properties		Ref
Permanent	Provisional	Named after	Date	Site	Discoverer(s)	Category	Diam.	Ref
859101	2013 GV_{149}	—	December 23, 2016	Haleakala	Pan-STARRS 1	·	1.3 km	MPC · JPL
859102	2013 GK_{150}	—	April 13, 2013	Haleakala	Pan-STARRS 1	·	1.7 km	MPC · JPL
859103	2013 GU_{150}	—	April 15, 2013	Haleakala	Pan-STARRS 1	·	1.7 km	MPC · JPL
859104	2013 GW_{152}	—	April 2, 2013	Mount Lemmon	Mount Lemmon Survey	·	770 m	MPC · JPL
859105	2013 GA_{153}	—	April 15, 2013	Haleakala	Pan-STARRS 1	MAS	600 m	MPC · JPL
859106	2013 GJ_{153}	—	April 15, 2013	Haleakala	Pan-STARRS 1	PHO	790 m	MPC · JPL
859107	2013 GE_{155}	—	April 11, 2013	ESA OGS	ESA OGS	·	430 m	MPC · JPL
859108	2013 GJ_{155}	—	April 12, 2013	Haleakala	Pan-STARRS 1	·	670 m	MPC · JPL
859109	2013 GH_{157}	—	April 10, 2013	Haleakala	Pan-STARRS 1	·	2.2 km	MPC · JPL
859110	2013 GX_{157}	—	April 13, 2013	Haleakala	Pan-STARRS 1	·	2.1 km	MPC · JPL
859111	2013 GA_{158}	—	April 7, 2013	Mount Lemmon	Mount Lemmon Survey	·	1.7 km	MPC · JPL
859112	2013 GD_{161}	—	April 14, 2013	ESA OGS	ESA OGS	·	940 m	MPC · JPL
859113	2013 GE_{161}	—	April 13, 2013	Haleakala	Pan-STARRS 1	NYS	940 m	MPC · JPL
859114	2013 GG_{161}	—	April 9, 2013	Haleakala	Pan-STARRS 1	·	840 m	MPC · JPL
859115	2013 GC_{162}	—	April 13, 2013	Haleakala	Pan-STARRS 1	THM	1.6 km	MPC · JPL
859116	2013 GR_{163}	—	April 10, 2013	Haleakala	Pan-STARRS 1	·	1.0 km	MPC · JPL
859117	2013 GW_{164}	—	April 12, 2013	Haleakala	Pan-STARRS 1	·	1.2 km	MPC · JPL
859118	2013 GZ_{165}	—	April 15, 2013	Haleakala	Pan-STARRS 1	EOS	1.3 km	MPC · JPL
859119	2013 GK_{167}	—	April 10, 2013	Haleakala	Pan-STARRS 1	·	800 m	MPC · JPL
859120	2013 GW_{168}	—	April 6, 2013	Mount Lemmon	Mount Lemmon Survey	V	430 m	MPC · JPL
859121	2013 GL_{171}	—	April 10, 2013	Haleakala	Pan-STARRS 1	·	1.8 km	MPC · JPL
859122	2013 HB_{1}	—	April 17, 2013	Palomar	Palomar Transient Factory	H	510 m	MPC · JPL
859123	2013 HG_{3}	—	April 17, 2013	Haleakala	Pan-STARRS 1	·	2.3 km	MPC · JPL
859124	2013 HP_{9}	—	April 19, 2013	Mount Lemmon	Mount Lemmon Survey	·	1.5 km	MPC · JPL
859125	2013 HE_{10}	—	April 14, 2013	Palomar	Palomar Transient Factory	T_{j} (2.98)	1.9 km	MPC · JPL
859126	2013 HS_{10}	—	April 20, 2013	Mount Lemmon	Mount Lemmon Survey	·	1.5 km	MPC · JPL
859127	2013 HN_{14}	—	April 13, 2013	Haleakala	Pan-STARRS 1	·	2.0 km	MPC · JPL
859128	2013 HC_{16}	—	January 31, 2008	Catalina	CSS	·	1.5 km	MPC · JPL
859129	2013 HT_{18}	—	April 24, 2013	Mount Lemmon	Mount Lemmon Survey	·	2.0 km	MPC · JPL
859130	2013 HG_{21}	—	April 9, 2006	Kitt Peak	Spacewatch	·	560 m	MPC · JPL
859131	2013 HK_{21}	—	April 29, 2013	Mount Lemmon	Mount Lemmon Survey	MAS	540 m	MPC · JPL
859132	2013 HB_{22}	—	October 24, 2009	Kitt Peak	Spacewatch	·	2.3 km	MPC · JPL
859133	2013 HY_{24}	—	April 12, 2013	Haleakala	Pan-STARRS 1	·	540 m	MPC · JPL
859134	2013 HP_{25}	—	May 1, 2013	Palomar	Palomar Transient Factory	PHO	660 m	MPC · JPL
859135	2013 HD_{28}	—	April 10, 2013	Mount Lemmon	Mount Lemmon Survey	·	820 m	MPC · JPL
859136	2013 HG_{29}	—	April 16, 2013	Cerro Tololo-DECam	DECam	EOS	1.0 km	MPC · JPL
859137	2013 HN_{29}	—	April 16, 2013	Cerro Tololo-DECam	DECam	EOS	1.2 km	MPC · JPL
859138	2013 HG_{30}	—	November 1, 2006	Kitt Peak	Spacewatch	WAT	1.0 km	MPC · JPL
859139	2013 HR_{30}	—	April 9, 2013	Haleakala	Pan-STARRS 1	·	1.3 km	MPC · JPL
859140	2013 HP_{31}	—	April 16, 2013	Cerro Tololo-DECam	DECam	·	900 m	MPC · JPL
859141	2013 HS_{35}	—	April 16, 2013	Cerro Tololo-DECam	DECam	·	1.7 km	MPC · JPL
859142	2013 HC_{37}	—	January 18, 2009	Kitt Peak	Spacewatch	·	580 m	MPC · JPL
859143	2013 HG_{37}	—	April 16, 2013	Cerro Tololo-DECam	DECam	·	1.2 km	MPC · JPL
859144	2013 HK_{37}	—	April 16, 2013	Cerro Tololo-DECam	DECam	·	1.8 km	MPC · JPL
859145	2013 HY_{39}	—	April 9, 2013	Haleakala	Pan-STARRS 1	PHO	560 m	MPC · JPL
859146	2013 HQ_{41}	—	October 3, 2010	Kitt Peak	Spacewatch	HOF	1.6 km	MPC · JPL
859147	2013 HG_{42}	—	April 9, 2013	Haleakala	Pan-STARRS 1	·	990 m	MPC · JPL
859148	2013 HF_{43}	—	April 16, 2013	Cerro Tololo-DECam	DECam	·	470 m	MPC · JPL
859149	2013 HH_{44}	—	April 9, 2013	Haleakala	Pan-STARRS 1	·	730 m	MPC · JPL
859150	2013 HM_{45}	—	April 16, 2013	Cerro Tololo-DECam	DECam	·	670 m	MPC · JPL
859151	2013 HW_{45}	—	April 16, 2013	Siding Spring	SSS	·	1.9 km	MPC · JPL
859152	2013 HG_{46}	—	April 16, 2013	Cerro Tololo-DECam	DECam	EOS	1.2 km	MPC · JPL
859153	2013 HV_{47}	—	April 16, 2013	Cerro Tololo-DECam	DECam	HOF	1.7 km	MPC · JPL
859154	2013 HV_{48}	—	March 17, 2013	Mount Lemmon	Mount Lemmon Survey	·	1.4 km	MPC · JPL
859155	2013 HA_{49}	—	April 16, 2013	Cerro Tololo-DECam	DECam	·	1.8 km	MPC · JPL
859156	2013 HP_{49}	—	April 9, 2013	Haleakala	Pan-STARRS 1	·	840 m	MPC · JPL
859157	2013 HT_{51}	—	April 16, 2013	Cerro Tololo-DECam	DECam	·	1.3 km	MPC · JPL
859158	2013 HW_{51}	—	April 16, 2013	Cerro Tololo-DECam	DECam	CLA	1.2 km	MPC · JPL
859159	2013 HP_{53}	—	April 9, 2013	Haleakala	Pan-STARRS 1	·	1.5 km	MPC · JPL
859160	2013 HR_{57}	—	April 16, 2013	Cerro Tololo-DECam	DECam	·	1.5 km	MPC · JPL
859161	2013 HS_{58}	—	April 16, 2013	Cerro Tololo-DECam	DECam	·	740 m	MPC · JPL
859162	2013 HK_{59}	—	April 16, 2013	Cerro Tololo-DECam	DECam	V	420 m	MPC · JPL
859163	2013 HN_{63}	—	May 1, 2013	Mount Lemmon	Mount Lemmon Survey	NYS	790 m	MPC · JPL
859164	2013 HH_{64}	—	April 16, 2013	Cerro Tololo-DECam	DECam	·	1.5 km	MPC · JPL
859165	2013 HU_{64}	—	April 9, 2013	Haleakala	Pan-STARRS 1	·	710 m	MPC · JPL
859166	2013 HH_{65}	—	September 17, 2010	Mount Lemmon	Mount Lemmon Survey	·	1.0 km	MPC · JPL
859167	2013 HN_{67}	—	April 16, 2013	Cerro Tololo-DECam	DECam	TEL	770 m	MPC · JPL
859168	2013 HM_{68}	—	October 3, 2010	Kitt Peak	Spacewatch	·	1.2 km	MPC · JPL
859169	2013 HB_{71}	—	April 9, 2013	Haleakala	Pan-STARRS 1	·	590 m	MPC · JPL
859170	2013 HG_{72}	—	October 1, 2010	Kitt Peak	Spacewatch	EOS	1.1 km	MPC · JPL
859171	2013 HO_{72}	—	July 30, 2005	Palomar	NEAT	·	1.0 km	MPC · JPL
859172	2013 HA_{76}	—	April 9, 2013	Haleakala	Pan-STARRS 1	T_{j} (2.99) · EUP	1.8 km	MPC · JPL
859173	2013 HC_{76}	—	November 26, 2005	Mount Lemmon	Mount Lemmon Survey	·	1.4 km	MPC · JPL
859174	2013 HF_{78}	—	April 9, 2013	Haleakala	Pan-STARRS 1	·	2.0 km	MPC · JPL
859175	2013 HR_{80}	—	April 10, 2013	Haleakala	Pan-STARRS 1	·	1.6 km	MPC · JPL
859176	2013 HE_{81}	—	May 12, 2013	Mount Lemmon	Mount Lemmon Survey	MAS	480 m	MPC · JPL
859177	2013 HM_{82}	—	April 9, 2013	Haleakala	Pan-STARRS 1	·	810 m	MPC · JPL
859178	2013 HS_{82}	—	April 16, 2013	Cerro Tololo-DECam	DECam	·	1.9 km	MPC · JPL
859179	2013 HE_{83}	—	April 15, 2013	Calar Alto	F. Hormuth	EOS	1.1 km	MPC · JPL
859180	2013 HM_{85}	—	April 9, 2013	Haleakala	Pan-STARRS 1	PHO	540 m	MPC · JPL
859181	2013 HO_{87}	—	April 1, 2013	Mount Lemmon	Mount Lemmon Survey	H	330 m	MPC · JPL
859182	2013 HZ_{87}	—	September 17, 2010	Mount Lemmon	Mount Lemmon Survey	·	830 m	MPC · JPL
859183	2013 HA_{88}	—	April 16, 2013	Cerro Tololo-DECam	DECam	EOS	1.1 km	MPC · JPL
859184	2013 HL_{94}	—	November 1, 2010	Mount Lemmon	Mount Lemmon Survey	·	1.4 km	MPC · JPL
859185	2013 HO_{94}	—	April 16, 2013	Cerro Tololo-DECam	DECam	·	1.8 km	MPC · JPL
859186	2013 HC_{95}	—	April 16, 2013	Cerro Tololo-DECam	DECam	·	1.7 km	MPC · JPL
859187	2013 HT_{96}	—	September 2, 2010	Mount Lemmon	Mount Lemmon Survey	·	1.2 km	MPC · JPL
859188	2013 HN_{97}	—	June 10, 2010	Mount Lemmon	Mount Lemmon Survey	·	920 m	MPC · JPL
859189	2013 HS_{101}	—	April 16, 2013	Cerro Tololo-DECam	DECam	·	620 m	MPC · JPL
859190	2013 HK_{107}	—	April 6, 2008	Kitt Peak	Spacewatch	·	1.4 km	MPC · JPL
859191	2013 HQ_{108}	—	August 8, 2005	Cerro Tololo	Deep Ecliptic Survey	AST	1.2 km	MPC · JPL
859192	2013 HJ_{110}	—	April 10, 2013	Haleakala	Pan-STARRS 1	·	1.9 km	MPC · JPL
859193	2013 HU_{110}	—	October 9, 1999	Kitt Peak	Spacewatch	·	780 m	MPC · JPL
859194	2013 HV_{110}	—	April 10, 2013	Haleakala	Pan-STARRS 1	·	1.9 km	MPC · JPL
859195	2013 HO_{111}	—	April 9, 2013	Haleakala	Pan-STARRS 1	·	1.0 km	MPC · JPL
859196	2013 HK_{112}	—	March 18, 2002	Kitt Peak	Deep Ecliptic Survey	·	490 m	MPC · JPL
859197	2013 HY_{112}	—	August 13, 2010	Kitt Peak	Spacewatch	·	600 m	MPC · JPL
859198	2013 HG_{114}	—	April 10, 2013	Haleakala	Pan-STARRS 1	·	2.6 km	MPC · JPL
859199	2013 HC_{117}	—	April 14, 2013	ESA OGS	ESA OGS	EOS	1.1 km	MPC · JPL
859200	2013 HJ_{118}	—	April 10, 2013	Haleakala	Pan-STARRS 1	·	470 m	MPC · JPL

== 859201–859300 ==
back to top

Designation			Discovery			Properties		Ref
Permanent	Provisional	Named after	Date	Site	Discoverer(s)	Category	Diam.	Ref
859201	2013 HO_{120}	—	April 5, 2000	Kitt Peak	Spacewatch	·	1.1 km	MPC · JPL
859202	2013 HH_{121}	—	April 10, 2013	Haleakala	Pan-STARRS 1	·	720 m	MPC · JPL
859203	2013 HG_{123}	—	August 16, 2009	Catalina	CSS	·	2.1 km	MPC · JPL
859204	2013 HW_{123}	—	April 17, 2013	Cerro Tololo-DECam	DECam	·	1.2 km	MPC · JPL
859205	2013 HA_{125}	—	April 17, 2013	Cerro Tololo-DECam	DECam	·	910 m	MPC · JPL
859206	2013 HD_{125}	—	April 9, 2013	Haleakala	Pan-STARRS 1	·	1.7 km	MPC · JPL
859207	2013 HD_{126}	—	October 30, 2010	Mount Lemmon	Mount Lemmon Survey	·	1.2 km	MPC · JPL
859208	2013 HP_{126}	—	April 17, 2013	Cerro Tololo-DECam	DECam	·	1.4 km	MPC · JPL
859209	2013 HS_{130}	—	April 9, 2013	Haleakala	Pan-STARRS 1	·	1.0 km	MPC · JPL
859210	2013 HW_{130}	—	April 9, 2013	Haleakala	Pan-STARRS 1	·	450 m	MPC · JPL
859211	2013 HT_{132}	—	February 27, 2009	Kitt Peak	Spacewatch	MAS	480 m	MPC · JPL
859212	2013 HU_{132}	—	April 17, 2013	Cerro Tololo-DECam	DECam	·	1.0 km	MPC · JPL
859213	2013 HA_{135}	—	April 17, 2013	Cerro Tololo-DECam	DECam	·	1.4 km	MPC · JPL
859214	2013 HM_{139}	—	April 17, 2013	Cerro Tololo-DECam	DECam	THM	1.6 km	MPC · JPL
859215	2013 HO_{140}	—	April 10, 2013	Haleakala	Pan-STARRS 1	AST	1.2 km	MPC · JPL
859216	2013 HX_{140}	—	October 29, 2011	Mayhill-ISON	L. Elenin	·	570 m	MPC · JPL
859217	2013 HZ_{141}	—	April 17, 2013	Cerro Tololo-DECam	DECam	·	1.4 km	MPC · JPL
859218	2013 HR_{143}	—	October 14, 2010	Mount Lemmon	Mount Lemmon Survey	·	1.1 km	MPC · JPL
859219	2013 HG_{145}	—	December 6, 2010	Mount Lemmon	Mount Lemmon Survey	·	2.0 km	MPC · JPL
859220	2013 HO_{147}	—	April 16, 2013	Cerro Tololo-DECam	DECam	MAS	470 m	MPC · JPL
859221	2013 HE_{149}	—	October 14, 2010	Mount Lemmon	Mount Lemmon Survey	·	1.1 km	MPC · JPL
859222	2013 HF_{151}	—	August 27, 2014	ESA OGS	ESA OGS	·	880 m	MPC · JPL
859223	2013 HQ_{152}	—	May 12, 2013	Mount Lemmon	Mount Lemmon Survey	·	1.8 km	MPC · JPL
859224	2013 HA_{157}	—	April 17, 2013	Haleakala	Pan-STARRS 1	H	450 m	MPC · JPL
859225	2013 HH_{157}	—	April 16, 2013	Haleakala	Pan-STARRS 1	·	910 m	MPC · JPL
859226	2013 HU_{157}	—	April 19, 2013	Haleakala	Pan-STARRS 1	·	1.8 km	MPC · JPL
859227	2013 HG_{160}	—	April 15, 2013	Haleakala	Pan-STARRS 1	T_{j} (2.97)	1.8 km	MPC · JPL
859228	2013 HN_{160}	—	April 19, 2013	Haleakala	Pan-STARRS 1	·	2.1 km	MPC · JPL
859229	2013 HO_{160}	—	April 17, 2013	Haleakala	Pan-STARRS 1	H	320 m	MPC · JPL
859230	2013 HR_{160}	—	September 2, 2014	Haleakala	Pan-STARRS 1	·	2.0 km	MPC · JPL
859231	2013 HA_{161}	—	April 18, 2013	Mount Lemmon	Mount Lemmon Survey	·	2.3 km	MPC · JPL
859232	2013 HF_{161}	—	April 20, 2013	Mount Lemmon	Mount Lemmon Survey	·	2.0 km	MPC · JPL
859233	2013 HL_{161}	—	December 4, 2015	Haleakala	Pan-STARRS 1	PHO	680 m	MPC · JPL
859234	2013 HC_{162}	—	April 16, 2013	Haleakala	Pan-STARRS 1	·	1 km	MPC · JPL
859235	2013 HP_{162}	—	April 18, 2013	Mount Lemmon	Mount Lemmon Survey	·	2.9 km	MPC · JPL
859236	2013 HF_{164}	—	April 17, 2013	Haleakala	Pan-STARRS 1	·	490 m	MPC · JPL
859237	2013 HH_{164}	—	April 19, 2013	Haleakala	Pan-STARRS 1	·	1.4 km	MPC · JPL
859238	2013 HN_{164}	—	April 19, 2013	Haleakala	Pan-STARRS 1	V	500 m	MPC · JPL
859239	2013 HT_{164}	—	April 30, 2013	Mount Lemmon	Mount Lemmon Survey	H	380 m	MPC · JPL
859240	2013 HV_{164}	—	April 19, 2013	Haleakala	Pan-STARRS 1	·	880 m	MPC · JPL
859241	2013 HN_{165}	—	April 19, 2013	Haleakala	Pan-STARRS 1	·	1.4 km	MPC · JPL
859242	2013 HL_{166}	—	April 16, 2013	Haleakala	Pan-STARRS 1	·	780 m	MPC · JPL
859243	2013 HM_{167}	—	April 22, 2013	Mount Lemmon	Mount Lemmon Survey	·	940 m	MPC · JPL
859244	2013 HN_{167}	—	April 16, 2013	Calar Alto	F. Hormuth	·	1.2 km	MPC · JPL
859245	2013 JF_{4}	—	March 3, 2013	Mount Lemmon	Mount Lemmon Survey	·	2.5 km	MPC · JPL
859246	2013 JP_{5}	—	April 13, 2013	Kitt Peak	Spacewatch	·	1.3 km	MPC · JPL
859247	2013 JG_{7}	—	April 13, 2013	Haleakala	Pan-STARRS 1	·	2.6 km	MPC · JPL
859248	2013 JC_{10}	—	September 29, 2010	Mount Lemmon	Mount Lemmon Survey	·	970 m	MPC · JPL
859249	2013 JO_{10}	—	April 8, 2013	Siding Spring	SSS	·	840 m	MPC · JPL
859250	2013 JQ_{12}	—	May 8, 2013	Haleakala	Pan-STARRS 1	·	1.9 km	MPC · JPL
859251	2013 JU_{12}	—	October 9, 2010	Mount Lemmon	Mount Lemmon Survey	MAS	620 m	MPC · JPL
859252	2013 JC_{13}	—	April 10, 2013	Kitt Peak	Spacewatch	JUN	880 m	MPC · JPL
859253	2013 JR_{16}	—	April 13, 2013	Haleakala	Pan-STARRS 1	DOR	1.8 km	MPC · JPL
859254	2013 JH_{23}	—	May 8, 2013	Haleakala	Pan-STARRS 1	·	1.1 km	MPC · JPL
859255	2013 JS_{27}	—	May 11, 2013	Kitt Peak	Spacewatch	T_{j} (2.98)	2.6 km	MPC · JPL
859256	2013 JH_{28}	—	April 15, 2013	Haleakala	Pan-STARRS 1	MAS	580 m	MPC · JPL
859257	2013 JF_{29}	—	May 11, 2013	Kitt Peak	Spacewatch	·	420 m	MPC · JPL
859258	2013 JP_{34}	—	May 12, 2013	Haleakala	Pan-STARRS 1	H	390 m	MPC · JPL
859259	2013 JV_{35}	—	May 15, 2013	Haleakala	Pan-STARRS 1	·	610 m	MPC · JPL
859260	2013 JD_{38}	—	January 27, 2012	Mount Lemmon	Mount Lemmon Survey	·	1.8 km	MPC · JPL
859261	2013 JO_{38}	—	May 10, 2013	Haleakala	Pan-STARRS 1	·	1.9 km	MPC · JPL
859262	2013 JC_{39}	—	May 11, 2013	Mount Lemmon	Mount Lemmon Survey	·	570 m	MPC · JPL
859263	2013 JJ_{39}	—	May 2, 2013	Kitt Peak	Spacewatch	·	1.3 km	MPC · JPL
859264	2013 JT_{39}	—	May 12, 2013	Kitt Peak	Spacewatch	·	1.4 km	MPC · JPL
859265	2013 JY_{39}	—	May 12, 2013	Mount Lemmon	Mount Lemmon Survey	·	1.0 km	MPC · JPL
859266	2013 JW_{40}	—	April 19, 2013	Haleakala	Pan-STARRS 1	·	1.8 km	MPC · JPL
859267	2013 JS_{43}	—	May 11, 2013	Mount Lemmon	Mount Lemmon Survey	·	1.5 km	MPC · JPL
859268	2013 JU_{44}	—	May 8, 2013	Haleakala	Pan-STARRS 1	MAS	580 m	MPC · JPL
859269	2013 JH_{45}	—	May 12, 2013	Kitt Peak	Spacewatch	·	1.4 km	MPC · JPL
859270	2013 JS_{45}	—	May 8, 2013	Haleakala	Pan-STARRS 1	VER	1.8 km	MPC · JPL
859271	2013 JN_{48}	—	April 15, 2013	Haleakala	Pan-STARRS 1	H	290 m	MPC · JPL
859272	2013 JP_{48}	—	October 10, 2004	Kitt Peak	Deep Ecliptic Survey	·	560 m	MPC · JPL
859273	2013 JW_{49}	—	May 1, 2013	Mount Lemmon	Mount Lemmon Survey	EOS	1.4 km	MPC · JPL
859274	2013 JK_{51}	—	April 15, 2013	Haleakala	Pan-STARRS 1	PHO	780 m	MPC · JPL
859275	2013 JE_{52}	—	April 25, 2003	Kitt Peak	Spacewatch	·	450 m	MPC · JPL
859276	2013 JR_{53}	—	April 13, 2013	Haleakala	Pan-STARRS 1	·	1.3 km	MPC · JPL
859277	2013 JK_{54}	—	May 8, 2013	Haleakala	Pan-STARRS 1	·	1.6 km	MPC · JPL
859278	2013 JU_{58}	—	May 9, 2013	Haleakala	Pan-STARRS 1	·	840 m	MPC · JPL
859279	2013 JW_{58}	—	February 1, 2012	Mount Lemmon	Mount Lemmon Survey	·	2.0 km	MPC · JPL
859280	2013 JX_{58}	—	April 13, 2013	Haleakala	Pan-STARRS 1	·	1.3 km	MPC · JPL
859281	2013 JG_{59}	—	September 15, 2010	Kitt Peak	Spacewatch	·	890 m	MPC · JPL
859282	2013 JT_{59}	—	May 3, 2013	Mount Lemmon	Mount Lemmon Survey	·	890 m	MPC · JPL
859283	2013 JK_{64}	—	May 7, 2013	Mauna Kea	OSSOS	res · 2:5	90 km	MPC · JPL
859284	2013 JY_{68}	—	May 2, 2013	Haleakala	Pan-STARRS 1	·	580 m	MPC · JPL
859285	2013 JM_{69}	—	May 15, 2013	Haleakala	Pan-STARRS 1	·	700 m	MPC · JPL
859286	2013 JL_{70}	—	May 15, 2013	Kitt Peak	Spacewatch	LIX	2.3 km	MPC · JPL
859287	2013 JQ_{70}	—	May 8, 2013	Haleakala	Pan-STARRS 1	·	470 m	MPC · JPL
859288	2013 JW_{70}	—	May 9, 2013	Haleakala	Pan-STARRS 1	·	2.3 km	MPC · JPL
859289	2013 JG_{71}	—	July 10, 2014	Haleakala	Pan-STARRS 1	·	1.9 km	MPC · JPL
859290	2013 JZ_{72}	—	May 8, 2013	Haleakala	Pan-STARRS 1	·	1.8 km	MPC · JPL
859291	2013 JD_{73}	—	July 28, 2014	Haleakala	Pan-STARRS 1	·	1.2 km	MPC · JPL
859292	2013 JE_{73}	—	May 12, 2013	Mount Lemmon	Mount Lemmon Survey	·	1.8 km	MPC · JPL
859293	2013 JL_{73}	—	August 3, 2014	Haleakala	Pan-STARRS 1	EOS	1.3 km	MPC · JPL
859294	2013 JU_{73}	—	September 14, 2014	Mount Lemmon	Mount Lemmon Survey	V	500 m	MPC · JPL
859295	2013 JE_{74}	—	July 29, 2014	Haleakala	Pan-STARRS 1	·	1.1 km	MPC · JPL
859296	2013 JG_{74}	—	May 12, 2013	Haleakala	Pan-STARRS 1	·	470 m	MPC · JPL
859297	2013 JM_{74}	—	May 10, 2013	Kitt Peak	Spacewatch	H	440 m	MPC · JPL
859298	2013 JK_{75}	—	May 8, 2013	Haleakala	Pan-STARRS 1	·	630 m	MPC · JPL
859299	2013 JN_{75}	—	May 12, 2013	Haleakala	Pan-STARRS 1	V	410 m	MPC · JPL
859300	2013 JR_{76}	—	May 8, 2013	Haleakala	Pan-STARRS 1	·	410 m	MPC · JPL

== 859301–859400 ==
back to top

Designation			Discovery			Properties		Ref
Permanent	Provisional	Named after	Date	Site	Discoverer(s)	Category	Diam.	Ref
859301	2013 JB_{78}	—	May 9, 2013	Haleakala	Pan-STARRS 1	·	2.0 km	MPC · JPL
859302	2013 JE_{78}	—	May 12, 2013	Mount Lemmon	Mount Lemmon Survey	·	2.0 km	MPC · JPL
859303	2013 JF_{78}	—	May 8, 2013	Haleakala	Pan-STARRS 1	·	2.1 km	MPC · JPL
859304	2013 JF_{79}	—	May 12, 2013	Mount Lemmon	Mount Lemmon Survey	·	900 m	MPC · JPL
859305	2013 JS_{79}	—	May 5, 2013	Haleakala	Pan-STARRS 1	·	1.7 km	MPC · JPL
859306	2013 JZ_{79}	—	May 15, 2013	Haleakala	Pan-STARRS 1	H	280 m	MPC · JPL
859307	2013 JU_{80}	—	May 15, 2013	Haleakala	Pan-STARRS 1	·	2.1 km	MPC · JPL
859308	2013 JY_{80}	—	May 12, 2013	Haleakala	Pan-STARRS 1	·	1.1 km	MPC · JPL
859309	2013 JP_{84}	—	May 1, 2013	Mount Lemmon	Mount Lemmon Survey	EOS	1.4 km	MPC · JPL
859310	2013 JW_{84}	—	May 9, 2013	Haleakala	Pan-STARRS 1	THM	1.5 km	MPC · JPL
859311	2013 JU_{85}	—	May 8, 2013	Haleakala	Pan-STARRS 1	·	930 m	MPC · JPL
859312	2013 KE_{1}	—	May 7, 2013	Mount Lemmon	Mount Lemmon Survey	·	2.0 km	MPC · JPL
859313	2013 KN_{8}	—	September 2, 2008	Kitt Peak	Spacewatch	T_{j} (2.97)	2.0 km	MPC · JPL
859314	2013 KA_{9}	—	March 16, 2013	Kitt Peak	Spacewatch	T_{j} (2.97)	2.0 km	MPC · JPL
859315	2013 KS_{9}	—	May 30, 2013	Kitt Peak	Spacewatch	·	860 m	MPC · JPL
859316	2013 KC_{11}	—	May 2, 2013	Haleakala	Pan-STARRS 1	·	2.2 km	MPC · JPL
859317	2013 KG_{13}	—	April 5, 2000	Socorro	LINEAR	·	1.2 km	MPC · JPL
859318	2013 KP_{13}	—	April 7, 2013	Mount Lemmon	Mount Lemmon Survey	·	1.4 km	MPC · JPL
859319	2013 KU_{14}	—	May 2, 2013	Haleakala	Pan-STARRS 1	·	570 m	MPC · JPL
859320	2013 KA_{19}	—	May 20, 2013	Haleakala	Pan-STARRS 1	·	1.9 km	MPC · JPL
859321	2013 KC_{20}	—	May 17, 2013	Mount Lemmon	Mount Lemmon Survey	·	2.0 km	MPC · JPL
859322	2013 KG_{20}	—	May 31, 2013	Haleakala	Pan-STARRS 1	H	430 m	MPC · JPL
859323	2013 KU_{20}	—	May 16, 2013	Haleakala	Pan-STARRS 1	·	640 m	MPC · JPL
859324	2013 KL_{21}	—	May 22, 2013	Mount Lemmon	Mount Lemmon Survey	·	2.3 km	MPC · JPL
859325	2013 KT_{21}	—	May 17, 2013	Mount Lemmon	Mount Lemmon Survey	·	870 m	MPC · JPL
859326	2013 KW_{21}	—	August 29, 2002	Palomar	NEAT	·	810 m	MPC · JPL
859327	2013 KB_{22}	—	May 16, 2013	Mount Lemmon	Mount Lemmon Survey	·	1.1 km	MPC · JPL
859328	2013 LK_{1}	—	April 16, 2013	Nogales	M. Schwartz, P. R. Holvorcem	·	1.5 km	MPC · JPL
859329	2013 LV_{1}	—	June 1, 2013	Haleakala	Pan-STARRS 1	EUN	860 m	MPC · JPL
859330	2013 LF_{5}	—	May 8, 2013	Haleakala	Pan-STARRS 1	·	460 m	MPC · JPL
859331	2013 LY_{6}	—	June 6, 2013	Mount Lemmon	Mount Lemmon Survey	H	440 m	MPC · JPL
859332	2013 LO_{7}	—	June 7, 2013	Mount Lemmon	Mount Lemmon Survey	H	430 m	MPC · JPL
859333	2013 LD_{9}	—	June 3, 2013	Kitt Peak	Spacewatch	·	1.7 km	MPC · JPL
859334	2013 LP_{9}	—	May 30, 2013	Mount Lemmon	Mount Lemmon Survey	NYS	720 m	MPC · JPL
859335	2013 LQ_{9}	—	June 4, 2013	Mount Lemmon	Mount Lemmon Survey	·	460 m	MPC · JPL
859336	2013 LE_{14}	—	May 15, 2013	Haleakala	Pan-STARRS 1	·	820 m	MPC · JPL
859337	2013 LH_{15}	—	June 6, 2013	Mount Lemmon	Mount Lemmon Survey	·	1.7 km	MPC · JPL
859338	2013 LN_{15}	—	July 14, 2009	Kitt Peak	Spacewatch	·	1.2 km	MPC · JPL
859339	2013 LN_{16}	—	May 16, 2013	Mount Lemmon	Mount Lemmon Survey	·	1.4 km	MPC · JPL
859340	2013 LX_{16}	—	May 12, 2013	Mount Lemmon	Mount Lemmon Survey	·	1.0 km	MPC · JPL
859341	2013 LM_{17}	—	May 30, 2013	Mount Lemmon	Mount Lemmon Survey	LIX	2.6 km	MPC · JPL
859342	2013 LC_{23}	—	June 4, 2013	Mount Lemmon	Mount Lemmon Survey	·	1.5 km	MPC · JPL
859343	2013 LN_{23}	—	April 15, 2013	Haleakala	Pan-STARRS 1	·	960 m	MPC · JPL
859344	2013 LJ_{26}	—	June 7, 2013	Piszkéstető	K. Sárneczky	·	1.1 km	MPC · JPL
859345	2013 LN_{28}	—	June 10, 2013	Elena Remote	Oreshko, A.	·	1.7 km	MPC · JPL
859346	2013 LY_{29}	—	June 10, 2013	Elena Remote	Oreshko, A.	·	2.2 km	MPC · JPL
859347	2013 LX_{30}	—	May 8, 2013	Haleakala	Pan-STARRS 1	·	900 m	MPC · JPL
859348	2013 LP_{35}	—	June 12, 2013	Haleakala	Pan-STARRS 1	·	1.8 km	MPC · JPL
859349	2013 LD_{36}	—	September 13, 1996	Kitt Peak	Spacewatch	THB	2.4 km	MPC · JPL
859350	2013 LS_{36}	—	June 5, 2013	Mount Lemmon	Mount Lemmon Survey	(2076)	520 m	MPC · JPL
859351	2013 LT_{36}	—	June 1, 2013	Nogales	M. Schwartz, P. R. Holvorcem	·	480 m	MPC · JPL
859352	2013 LH_{38}	—	June 12, 2013	Haleakala	Pan-STARRS 1	·	2.2 km	MPC · JPL
859353	2013 LB_{39}	—	September 3, 2008	Kitt Peak	Spacewatch	·	1.6 km	MPC · JPL
859354	2013 LG_{39}	—	June 2, 2013	Mount Lemmon	Mount Lemmon Survey	·	1.9 km	MPC · JPL
859355	2013 LB_{40}	—	August 20, 2014	Haleakala	Pan-STARRS 1	·	1.5 km	MPC · JPL
859356	2013 LF_{40}	—	June 8, 2013	Mount Lemmon	Mount Lemmon Survey	·	1.7 km	MPC · JPL
859357	2013 LR_{40}	—	June 4, 2013	Haleakala	Pan-STARRS 1	·	970 m	MPC · JPL
859358	2013 LD_{41}	—	June 4, 2013	Mount Lemmon	Mount Lemmon Survey	·	990 m	MPC · JPL
859359	2013 LF_{41}	—	June 7, 2013	Mount Lemmon	Mount Lemmon Survey	·	690 m	MPC · JPL
859360	2013 LF_{43}	—	June 5, 2013	Mount Lemmon	Mount Lemmon Survey	BRG	970 m	MPC · JPL
859361	2013 LK_{43}	—	June 7, 2013	Haleakala	Pan-STARRS 1	THM	1.6 km	MPC · JPL
859362	2013 LR_{44}	—	June 7, 2013	Haleakala	Pan-STARRS 1	·	1.8 km	MPC · JPL
859363	2013 LY_{44}	—	June 5, 2013	Mount Lemmon	Mount Lemmon Survey	PHO	600 m	MPC · JPL
859364	2013 MY_{2}	—	March 16, 2007	Kitt Peak	Spacewatch	·	1.6 km	MPC · JPL
859365	2013 MX_{5}	—	June 18, 2013	Črni Vrh	Matičič, S.	AMO	580 m	MPC · JPL
859366	2013 ME_{9}	—	June 30, 2013	Haleakala	Pan-STARRS 1	·	860 m	MPC · JPL
859367	2013 MA_{14}	—	June 19, 2013	Mount Lemmon	Mount Lemmon Survey	·	500 m	MPC · JPL
859368	2013 MK_{15}	—	June 18, 2013	Haleakala	Pan-STARRS 1	·	750 m	MPC · JPL
859369	2013 MX_{15}	—	August 5, 2002	Campo Imperatore	CINEOS	·	2.3 km	MPC · JPL
859370	2013 MD_{16}	—	June 30, 2013	Haleakala	Pan-STARRS 1	·	2.3 km	MPC · JPL
859371	2013 ML_{16}	—	June 18, 2013	Mount Lemmon	Mount Lemmon Survey	EUP	2.6 km	MPC · JPL
859372	2013 MN_{16}	—	June 29, 2013	Tincana	Zolnowski, M., Kusiak, M.	·	1.3 km	MPC · JPL
859373	2013 MV_{16}	—	June 18, 2013	Haleakala	Pan-STARRS 1	·	800 m	MPC · JPL
859374	2013 MG_{17}	—	October 22, 2014	Catalina	CSS	·	2.5 km	MPC · JPL
859375	2013 MO_{17}	—	September 12, 2001	Socorro	LINEAR	·	950 m	MPC · JPL
859376	2013 MA_{18}	—	June 16, 2013	Haleakala	Pan-STARRS 1	·	930 m	MPC · JPL
859377	2013 MR_{19}	—	June 20, 2013	Haleakala	Pan-STARRS 1	H	350 m	MPC · JPL
859378	2013 MV_{19}	—	June 20, 2013	Haleakala	Pan-STARRS 1	·	2.6 km	MPC · JPL
859379	2013 MF_{20}	—	June 30, 2013	Haleakala	Pan-STARRS 1	JUN	860 m	MPC · JPL
859380	2013 MN_{20}	—	June 20, 2013	Haleakala	Pan-STARRS 1	·	1.7 km	MPC · JPL
859381	2013 MP_{21}	—	June 20, 2013	Haleakala	Pan-STARRS 1	·	700 m	MPC · JPL
859382	2013 MC_{23}	—	June 20, 2013	Haleakala	Pan-STARRS 1	·	1.8 km	MPC · JPL
859383	2013 MX_{24}	—	June 18, 2013	Haleakala	Pan-STARRS 1	·	1.7 km	MPC · JPL
859384	2013 MS_{25}	—	December 9, 2015	Haleakala	Pan-STARRS 1	·	2.1 km	MPC · JPL
859385	2013 NM	—	June 12, 2013	Haleakala	Pan-STARRS 1	·	400 m	MPC · JPL
859386	2013 NX_{1}	—	July 1, 2013	Haleakala	Pan-STARRS 1	·	2.9 km	MPC · JPL
859387	2013 NG_{2}	—	March 1, 2009	Kitt Peak	Spacewatch	·	680 m	MPC · JPL
859388	2013 NK_{3}	—	October 14, 2010	Mount Lemmon	Mount Lemmon Survey	·	540 m	MPC · JPL
859389	2013 NR_{8}	—	July 1, 2013	Haleakala	Pan-STARRS 1	·	2.7 km	MPC · JPL
859390	2013 NY_{8}	—	July 2, 2013	Haleakala	Pan-STARRS 1	·	630 m	MPC · JPL
859391	2013 NF_{9}	—	July 6, 2013	Haleakala	Pan-STARRS 1	·	2.0 km	MPC · JPL
859392	2013 NA_{10}	—	August 5, 2002	Palomar Mountain	NEAT	·	2.0 km	MPC · JPL
859393	2013 NT_{10}	—	June 18, 2013	Haleakala	Pan-STARRS 1	·	960 m	MPC · JPL
859394	2013 NJ_{11}	—	July 9, 2013	Haleakala	Pan-STARRS 1	·	1.4 km	MPC · JPL
859395	2013 NQ_{14}	—	July 13, 2013	Haleakala	Pan-STARRS 1	HOF	1.8 km	MPC · JPL
859396	2013 NS_{15}	—	July 12, 2013	Haleakala	Pan-STARRS 1	·	2.0 km	MPC · JPL
859397	2013 NX_{16}	—	July 13, 2013	Mount Lemmon	Mount Lemmon Survey	THB	2.3 km	MPC · JPL
859398	2013 NO_{21}	—	July 13, 2013	Haleakala	Pan-STARRS 1	NYS	920 m	MPC · JPL
859399	2013 NV_{21}	—	July 13, 2013	Haleakala	Pan-STARRS 1	·	1.6 km	MPC · JPL
859400	2013 NZ_{22}	—	July 15, 2013	Haleakala	Pan-STARRS 1	·	770 m	MPC · JPL

== 859401–859500 ==
back to top

Designation			Discovery			Properties		Ref
Permanent	Provisional	Named after	Date	Site	Discoverer(s)	Category	Diam.	Ref
859401	2013 NA_{23}	—	July 15, 2013	Haleakala	Pan-STARRS 1	·	460 m	MPC · JPL
859402	2013 NZ_{25}	—	July 15, 2013	Haleakala	Pan-STARRS 1	SUL	1.3 km	MPC · JPL
859403	2013 NS_{26}	—	April 15, 2012	Haleakala	Pan-STARRS 1	·	2.1 km	MPC · JPL
859404	2013 NW_{26}	—	July 15, 2013	Haleakala	Pan-STARRS 1	·	2.1 km	MPC · JPL
859405	2013 NV_{27}	—	October 24, 2009	Kitt Peak	Spacewatch	·	1.4 km	MPC · JPL
859406	2013 NK_{29}	—	February 7, 2011	Mount Lemmon	Mount Lemmon Survey	EOS	1.3 km	MPC · JPL
859407	2013 NT_{29}	—	July 14, 2013	Haleakala	Pan-STARRS 1	·	2.2 km	MPC · JPL
859408	2013 NM_{30}	—	February 10, 2011	Mount Lemmon	Mount Lemmon Survey	·	2.7 km	MPC · JPL
859409	2013 NB_{31}	—	July 14, 2013	Haleakala	Pan-STARRS 1	·	2.5 km	MPC · JPL
859410	2013 NG_{31}	—	July 14, 2013	Haleakala	Pan-STARRS 1	·	2.1 km	MPC · JPL
859411	2013 NW_{31}	—	February 14, 2012	Haleakala	Pan-STARRS 1	V	410 m	MPC · JPL
859412	2013 NZ_{31}	—	July 15, 2013	Haleakala	Pan-STARRS 1	·	2.0 km	MPC · JPL
859413	2013 NJ_{32}	—	July 15, 2013	Haleakala	Pan-STARRS 1	·	2.2 km	MPC · JPL
859414	2013 NU_{32}	—	July 15, 2013	Haleakala	Pan-STARRS 1	T_{j} (2.99)	2.7 km	MPC · JPL
859415	2013 NK_{34}	—	July 14, 2013	Haleakala	Pan-STARRS 1	·	810 m	MPC · JPL
859416	2013 NM_{34}	—	July 15, 2013	Haleakala	Pan-STARRS 1	·	920 m	MPC · JPL
859417	2013 NO_{34}	—	July 1, 2013	Haleakala	Pan-STARRS 1	·	810 m	MPC · JPL
859418	2013 NM_{35}	—	April 3, 2016	Haleakala	Pan-STARRS 1	·	530 m	MPC · JPL
859419	2013 NV_{35}	—	July 9, 2013	Haleakala	Pan-STARRS 1	·	1.4 km	MPC · JPL
859420	2013 NB_{37}	—	July 14, 2013	Haleakala	Pan-STARRS 1	·	1.1 km	MPC · JPL
859421	2013 ND_{37}	—	July 1, 2013	Haleakala	Pan-STARRS 1	·	890 m	MPC · JPL
859422	2013 NH_{37}	—	July 13, 2013	Mount Lemmon	Mount Lemmon Survey	PHO	650 m	MPC · JPL
859423	2013 NK_{37}	—	July 14, 2013	Haleakala	Pan-STARRS 1	EUP	2.4 km	MPC · JPL
859424	2013 NM_{37}	—	July 9, 2013	Haleakala	Pan-STARRS 1	PHO	720 m	MPC · JPL
859425	2013 NE_{38}	—	July 14, 2013	Haleakala	Pan-STARRS 1	HNS	710 m	MPC · JPL
859426	2013 NG_{38}	—	July 2, 2013	Haleakala	Pan-STARRS 1	(22805)	2.8 km	MPC · JPL
859427	2013 NY_{39}	—	February 2, 2017	Haleakala	Pan-STARRS 1	·	2.5 km	MPC · JPL
859428	2013 NG_{40}	—	September 11, 2002	Palomar	NEAT	·	2.2 km	MPC · JPL
859429	2013 NP_{40}	—	January 5, 2016	Haleakala	Pan-STARRS 1	·	2.8 km	MPC · JPL
859430	2013 NQ_{40}	—	December 24, 2016	Haleakala	Pan-STARRS 1	H	390 m	MPC · JPL
859431	2013 NS_{40}	—	July 1, 2013	Haleakala	Pan-STARRS 1	·	2.3 km	MPC · JPL
859432	2013 ND_{41}	—	September 4, 2014	Haleakala	Pan-STARRS 1	T_{j} (2.99) · EUP	2.9 km	MPC · JPL
859433	2013 NG_{41}	—	August 30, 2014	Haleakala	Pan-STARRS 1	EOS	1.4 km	MPC · JPL
859434	2013 NH_{41}	—	July 14, 2013	Haleakala	Pan-STARRS 1	·	2.2 km	MPC · JPL
859435	2013 NL_{41}	—	July 12, 2013	Haleakala	Pan-STARRS 1	EOS	1.3 km	MPC · JPL
859436	2013 NN_{41}	—	July 13, 2013	Mount Lemmon	Mount Lemmon Survey	THB	1.9 km	MPC · JPL
859437	2013 NR_{41}	—	March 19, 2018	Mount Lemmon	Mount Lemmon Survey	·	2.2 km	MPC · JPL
859438	2013 NC_{42}	—	May 16, 2018	Mount Lemmon	Mount Lemmon Survey	·	2.1 km	MPC · JPL
859439	2013 NZ_{42}	—	July 13, 2013	Haleakala	Pan-STARRS 1	·	1.9 km	MPC · JPL
859440	2013 NA_{43}	—	July 15, 2013	Haleakala	Pan-STARRS 1	T_{j} (2.96)	2.5 km	MPC · JPL
859441	2013 NH_{43}	—	July 15, 2013	Haleakala	Pan-STARRS 1	·	500 m	MPC · JPL
859442	2013 NX_{43}	—	July 15, 2013	Haleakala	Pan-STARRS 1	·	900 m	MPC · JPL
859443	2013 NA_{45}	—	July 9, 2013	Haleakala	Pan-STARRS 1	·	2.3 km	MPC · JPL
859444	2013 NG_{45}	—	July 15, 2013	Haleakala	Pan-STARRS 1	·	1.7 km	MPC · JPL
859445	2013 NH_{45}	—	October 3, 2014	Mount Lemmon	Mount Lemmon Survey	·	2.1 km	MPC · JPL
859446	2013 NJ_{45}	—	July 14, 2013	Haleakala	Pan-STARRS 1	LIX	2.3 km	MPC · JPL
859447	2013 NB_{46}	—	July 14, 2013	Haleakala	Pan-STARRS 1	·	1.6 km	MPC · JPL
859448	2013 NC_{46}	—	July 14, 2013	Haleakala	Pan-STARRS 1	·	810 m	MPC · JPL
859449	2013 NG_{47}	—	July 13, 2013	Haleakala	Pan-STARRS 1	·	720 m	MPC · JPL
859450	2013 NY_{47}	—	July 14, 2013	Haleakala	Pan-STARRS 1	·	2.0 km	MPC · JPL
859451	2013 ND_{48}	—	July 15, 2013	Haleakala	Pan-STARRS 1	·	2.3 km	MPC · JPL
859452	2013 NS_{48}	—	July 14, 2013	Haleakala	Pan-STARRS 1	·	820 m	MPC · JPL
859453	2013 NS_{49}	—	July 1, 2013	Haleakala	Pan-STARRS 1	·	660 m	MPC · JPL
859454	2013 NW_{49}	—	July 14, 2013	Haleakala	Pan-STARRS 1	NYS	790 m	MPC · JPL
859455	2013 NK_{50}	—	July 2, 2013	Haleakala	Pan-STARRS 1	·	720 m	MPC · JPL
859456	2013 NL_{50}	—	July 13, 2013	Haleakala	Pan-STARRS 1	·	660 m	MPC · JPL
859457	2013 NO_{50}	—	July 14, 2013	Haleakala	Pan-STARRS 1	·	750 m	MPC · JPL
859458	2013 NU_{50}	—	July 14, 2013	Haleakala	Pan-STARRS 1	NYS	770 m	MPC · JPL
859459	2013 NH_{51}	—	July 2, 2013	Haleakala	Pan-STARRS 1	·	500 m	MPC · JPL
859460	2013 NT_{51}	—	July 14, 2013	Haleakala	Pan-STARRS 1	·	550 m	MPC · JPL
859461	2013 NX_{51}	—	July 15, 2013	Haleakala	Pan-STARRS 1	·	560 m	MPC · JPL
859462	2013 NM_{53}	—	July 6, 2013	Haleakala	Pan-STARRS 1	NYS	760 m	MPC · JPL
859463	2013 NC_{55}	—	July 13, 2013	Haleakala	Pan-STARRS 1	·	610 m	MPC · JPL
859464	2013 NK_{55}	—	July 14, 2013	Haleakala	Pan-STARRS 1	·	1.1 km	MPC · JPL
859465	2013 NL_{55}	—	July 14, 2013	Haleakala	Pan-STARRS 1	·	740 m	MPC · JPL
859466	2013 NM_{55}	—	July 14, 2013	Haleakala	Pan-STARRS 1	·	1.7 km	MPC · JPL
859467	2013 NA_{56}	—	July 1, 2013	Haleakala	Pan-STARRS 1	·	530 m	MPC · JPL
859468	2013 NH_{56}	—	July 2, 2013	Haleakala	Pan-STARRS 1	·	2.2 km	MPC · JPL
859469	2013 NT_{56}	—	July 14, 2013	Haleakala	Pan-STARRS 1	·	2.2 km	MPC · JPL
859470	2013 NQ_{57}	—	July 6, 2013	Haleakala	Pan-STARRS 1	·	2.1 km	MPC · JPL
859471	2013 NJ_{58}	—	July 12, 2013	Haleakala	Pan-STARRS 1	·	1.8 km	MPC · JPL
859472	2013 NT_{58}	—	July 1, 2013	Haleakala	Pan-STARRS 1	H	340 m	MPC · JPL
859473	2013 NP_{59}	—	July 14, 2013	Haleakala	Pan-STARRS 1	PHO	630 m	MPC · JPL
859474	2013 NV_{61}	—	July 14, 2013	Haleakala	Pan-STARRS 1	·	690 m	MPC · JPL
859475	2013 NK_{63}	—	July 14, 2013	Haleakala	Pan-STARRS 1	·	1.1 km	MPC · JPL
859476	2013 NP_{63}	—	July 15, 2013	Haleakala	Pan-STARRS 1	·	1.2 km	MPC · JPL
859477	2013 NU_{63}	—	July 14, 2013	Haleakala	Pan-STARRS 1	·	910 m	MPC · JPL
859478	2013 NC_{64}	—	July 14, 2013	Haleakala	Pan-STARRS 1	·	1.2 km	MPC · JPL
859479	2013 ND_{64}	—	July 13, 2013	Haleakala	Pan-STARRS 1	HYG	1.8 km	MPC · JPL
859480	2013 NT_{64}	—	July 14, 2013	Haleakala	Pan-STARRS 1	PHO	800 m	MPC · JPL
859481	2013 NV_{66}	—	July 2, 2013	Haleakala	Pan-STARRS 1	·	1.5 km	MPC · JPL
859482	2013 NV_{71}	—	July 14, 2013	Haleakala	Pan-STARRS 1	·	1.2 km	MPC · JPL
859483	2013 NR_{78}	—	September 12, 2020	Haleakala	Pan-STARRS 1	·	2.1 km	MPC · JPL
859484	2013 NT_{79}	—	July 13, 2013	Haleakala	Pan-STARRS 1	·	930 m	MPC · JPL
859485	2013 NN_{80}	—	July 13, 2013	Haleakala	Pan-STARRS 1	·	570 m	MPC · JPL
859486	2013 OX_{4}	—	July 11, 2004	Palomar	NEAT	·	1.5 km	MPC · JPL
859487	2013 ON_{5}	—	July 20, 2013	Haleakala	Pan-STARRS 1	AMO	610 m	MPC · JPL
859488	2013 OC_{6}	—	July 31, 2013	Elena Remote	Oreshko, A.	·	2.5 km	MPC · JPL
859489	2013 OX_{7}	—	June 2, 2013	Mount Lemmon	Mount Lemmon Survey	·	1.5 km	MPC · JPL
859490	2013 OV_{10}	—	July 19, 2013	Haleakala	Pan-STARRS 1	·	1.7 km	MPC · JPL
859491	2013 OE_{13}	—	July 30, 2013	Kitt Peak	Spacewatch	·	2.2 km	MPC · JPL
859492	2013 OJ_{13}	—	July 16, 2013	Haleakala	Pan-STARRS 1	EUN	900 m	MPC · JPL
859493	2013 OU_{14}	—	July 16, 2013	Haleakala	Pan-STARRS 1	EUP	2.2 km	MPC · JPL
859494	2013 OL_{15}	—	July 20, 2013	Haleakala	Pan-STARRS 1	T_{j} (2.73) · unusual	5.0 km	MPC · JPL
859495	2013 OV_{15}	—	July 30, 2013	Kitt Peak	Spacewatch	·	1.3 km	MPC · JPL
859496	2013 OG_{16}	—	July 16, 2013	Haleakala	Pan-STARRS 1	·	450 m	MPC · JPL
859497	2013 OL_{16}	—	July 16, 2013	Haleakala	Pan-STARRS 1	EOS	1.4 km	MPC · JPL
859498	2013 OS_{16}	—	July 18, 2013	Haleakala	Pan-STARRS 1	URS	2.3 km	MPC · JPL
859499	2013 OV_{16}	—	July 16, 2013	Haleakala	Pan-STARRS 1	VER	2.0 km	MPC · JPL
859500	2013 OY_{16}	—	July 18, 2013	Haleakala	Pan-STARRS 1	·	2.2 km	MPC · JPL

== 859501–859600 ==
back to top

Designation			Discovery			Properties		Ref
Permanent	Provisional	Named after	Date	Site	Discoverer(s)	Category	Diam.	Ref
859501	2013 OL_{17}	—	July 16, 2013	Haleakala	Pan-STARRS 1	·	2.8 km	MPC · JPL
859502	2013 OR_{17}	—	July 16, 2013	Haleakala	Pan-STARRS 1	·	1.9 km	MPC · JPL
859503	2013 OT_{17}	—	July 16, 2013	Haleakala	Pan-STARRS 1	·	2.1 km	MPC · JPL
859504	2013 OB_{19}	—	July 16, 2013	Haleakala	Pan-STARRS 1	·	1.4 km	MPC · JPL
859505	2013 OE_{19}	—	July 16, 2013	Haleakala	Pan-STARRS 1	·	2.4 km	MPC · JPL
859506	2013 PV_{2}	—	July 14, 2013	Haleakala	Pan-STARRS 1	AMO · slow	340 m	MPC · JPL
859507	2013 PC_{5}	—	January 3, 2011	Mount Lemmon	Mount Lemmon Survey	·	2.0 km	MPC · JPL
859508	2013 PU_{6}	—	July 8, 2013	Siding Spring	SSS	·	870 m	MPC · JPL
859509	2013 PP_{7}	—	August 2, 2013	Haleakala	Pan-STARRS 1	·	1.2 km	MPC · JPL
859510	2013 PC_{8}	—	July 14, 2013	Haleakala	Pan-STARRS 1	·	2.2 km	MPC · JPL
859511	2013 PJ_{8}	—	July 28, 2013	Haleakala	Pan-STARRS 1	VER	1.8 km	MPC · JPL
859512	2013 PG_{12}	—	February 1, 2012	Kitt Peak	Spacewatch	H	260 m	MPC · JPL
859513	2013 PM_{12}	—	August 4, 2013	Haleakala	Pan-STARRS 1	·	320 m	MPC · JPL
859514	2013 PF_{13}	—	October 9, 2008	Catalina	CSS	·	1.9 km	MPC · JPL
859515	2013 PO_{14}	—	August 7, 2013	Haleakala	Pan-STARRS 1	·	1.2 km	MPC · JPL
859516	2013 PB_{15}	—	August 3, 2013	Haleakala	Pan-STARRS 1	·	460 m	MPC · JPL
859517	2013 PU_{16}	—	August 13, 2002	Palomar	NEAT	·	2.7 km	MPC · JPL
859518	2013 PW_{16}	—	August 8, 2013	Palomar	Palomar Transient Factory	EUN	900 m	MPC · JPL
859519	2013 PZ_{16}	—	August 8, 2013	Elena Remote	Oreshko, A.	·	1.0 km	MPC · JPL
859520	2013 PW_{18}	—	May 2, 2008	Kitt Peak	Spacewatch	·	1.3 km	MPC · JPL
859521	2013 PB_{20}	—	March 11, 2005	Kitt Peak	Deep Ecliptic Survey	·	570 m	MPC · JPL
859522	2013 PL_{20}	—	August 9, 2013	Haleakala	Pan-STARRS 1	·	510 m	MPC · JPL
859523	2013 PZ_{20}	—	August 9, 2013	Catalina	CSS	T_{j} (2.94) · critical	1.1 km	MPC · JPL
859524	2013 PD_{21}	—	August 8, 2013	Haleakala	Pan-STARRS 1	APO	470 m	MPC · JPL
859525	2013 PK_{23}	—	October 30, 2010	Mount Lemmon	Mount Lemmon Survey	·	480 m	MPC · JPL
859526	2013 PZ_{31}	—	September 23, 2009	Mount Lemmon	Mount Lemmon Survey	MAR	750 m	MPC · JPL
859527	2013 PT_{35}	—	August 9, 2013	Palomar	Palomar Transient Factory	JUN	780 m	MPC · JPL
859528	2013 PT_{36}	—	July 30, 2013	Kitt Peak	Spacewatch	LUT	2.9 km	MPC · JPL
859529	2013 PQ_{38}	—	August 13, 2013	Palomar Mountain	Palomar Transient Factory	·	2.9 km	MPC · JPL
859530	2013 PV_{38}	—	September 23, 2000	Socorro	LINEAR	·	510 m	MPC · JPL
859531	2013 PA_{41}	—	August 12, 2013	Haleakala	Pan-STARRS 1	V	410 m	MPC · JPL
859532	2013 PT_{41}	—	August 12, 2013	Haleakala	Pan-STARRS 1	·	1.3 km	MPC · JPL
859533	2013 PC_{45}	—	August 8, 2013	Haleakala	Pan-STARRS 1	VER	2.2 km	MPC · JPL
859534	2013 PZ_{45}	—	January 28, 2011	Mount Lemmon	Mount Lemmon Survey	·	2.1 km	MPC · JPL
859535	2013 PQ_{49}	—	August 17, 1999	Kitt Peak	Spacewatch	·	450 m	MPC · JPL
859536	2013 PH_{50}	—	August 12, 2013	Haleakala	Pan-STARRS 1	·	870 m	MPC · JPL
859537	2013 PV_{50}	—	August 12, 2013	Haleakala	Pan-STARRS 1	·	1.4 km	MPC · JPL
859538	2013 PU_{51}	—	August 13, 2013	Kitt Peak	Spacewatch	·	570 m	MPC · JPL
859539	2013 PF_{53}	—	August 14, 2013	Haleakala	Pan-STARRS 1	H	310 m	MPC · JPL
859540	2013 PC_{54}	—	October 23, 2008	Kitt Peak	Spacewatch	THM	1.7 km	MPC · JPL
859541	2013 PQ_{54}	—	August 14, 2013	Haleakala	Pan-STARRS 1	·	460 m	MPC · JPL
859542	2013 PT_{60}	—	July 15, 2013	Haleakala	Pan-STARRS 1	·	2.4 km	MPC · JPL
859543	2013 PA_{63}	—	June 20, 2013	Haleakala	Pan-STARRS 1	·	1.0 km	MPC · JPL
859544	2013 PS_{63}	—	July 16, 2013	Haleakala	Pan-STARRS 1	·	490 m	MPC · JPL
859545	2013 PW_{66}	—	August 15, 2013	Haleakala	Pan-STARRS 1	H	400 m	MPC · JPL
859546	2013 PQ_{67}	—	August 11, 2013	SATINO Remote	J. Jahn	·	1.2 km	MPC · JPL
859547	2013 PX_{71}	—	September 23, 2008	Kitt Peak	Spacewatch	·	2.1 km	MPC · JPL
859548	2013 PA_{73}	—	August 9, 2013	Kitt Peak	Spacewatch	URS	2.6 km	MPC · JPL
859549	2013 PS_{75}	—	August 1, 2013	Haleakala	Pan-STARRS 1	·	2.6 km	MPC · JPL
859550	2013 PY_{75}	—	August 14, 2013	Haleakala	Pan-STARRS 1	·	1.3 km	MPC · JPL
859551	2013 PE_{77}	—	May 5, 2008	Mount Lemmon	Mount Lemmon Survey	·	1.2 km	MPC · JPL
859552	2013 PO_{77}	—	August 13, 2013	Kitt Peak	Spacewatch	·	2.1 km	MPC · JPL
859553	2013 PJ_{78}	—	August 14, 2013	Haleakala	Pan-STARRS 1	·	810 m	MPC · JPL
859554	2013 PB_{79}	—	April 30, 2003	Kitt Peak	Spacewatch	·	1.4 km	MPC · JPL
859555	2013 PH_{80}	—	August 9, 2013	Kitt Peak	Spacewatch	·	2.3 km	MPC · JPL
859556	2013 PN_{81}	—	April 30, 2012	Mount Lemmon	Mount Lemmon Survey	·	2.0 km	MPC · JPL
859557	2013 PO_{83}	—	August 9, 2013	Kitt Peak	Spacewatch	·	890 m	MPC · JPL
859558	2013 PH_{84}	—	February 5, 2011	Kitt Peak	Spacewatch	NYS	990 m	MPC · JPL
859559	2013 PJ_{85}	—	August 8, 2013	Haleakala	Pan-STARRS 1	·	1.2 km	MPC · JPL
859560	2013 PR_{86}	—	August 9, 2013	Haleakala	Pan-STARRS 1	·	1.0 km	MPC · JPL
859561	2013 PV_{86}	—	September 28, 2003	Kitt Peak	Spacewatch	·	450 m	MPC · JPL
859562	2013 PJ_{87}	—	August 9, 2013	Haleakala	Pan-STARRS 1	NYS	900 m	MPC · JPL
859563	2013 PG_{88}	—	August 15, 2013	Haleakala	Pan-STARRS 1	·	2.2 km	MPC · JPL
859564	2013 PO_{88}	—	August 4, 2013	Haleakala	Pan-STARRS 1	·	2.1 km	MPC · JPL
859565	2013 PR_{88}	—	August 12, 2013	Haleakala	Pan-STARRS 1	·	2.5 km	MPC · JPL
859566	2013 PU_{88}	—	August 14, 2013	Haleakala	Pan-STARRS 1	·	670 m	MPC · JPL
859567	2013 PW_{89}	—	August 15, 2013	Haleakala	Pan-STARRS 1	·	870 m	MPC · JPL
859568	2013 PR_{90}	—	September 6, 2008	Kitt Peak	Spacewatch	·	1.2 km	MPC · JPL
859569	2013 PY_{90}	—	August 8, 2013	Kitt Peak	Spacewatch	·	2.3 km	MPC · JPL
859570	2013 PL_{91}	—	August 8, 2013	Kitt Peak	Spacewatch	TIR	1.9 km	MPC · JPL
859571	2013 PR_{91}	—	November 20, 2014	Haleakala	Pan-STARRS 1	·	1.5 km	MPC · JPL
859572	2013 PF_{93}	—	August 12, 2013	Haleakala	Pan-STARRS 1	URS	2.5 km	MPC · JPL
859573	2013 PJ_{93}	—	August 15, 2013	Haleakala	Pan-STARRS 1	·	2.0 km	MPC · JPL
859574	2013 PU_{93}	—	August 9, 2013	Kitt Peak	Spacewatch	·	2.2 km	MPC · JPL
859575	2013 PZ_{94}	—	August 15, 2013	Haleakala	Pan-STARRS 1	·	1.3 km	MPC · JPL
859576	2013 PS_{95}	—	August 12, 2013	Kitt Peak	Spacewatch	·	770 m	MPC · JPL
859577	2013 PW_{95}	—	August 9, 2013	Haleakala	Pan-STARRS 1	·	620 m	MPC · JPL
859578	2013 PK_{96}	—	August 12, 2013	Haleakala	Pan-STARRS 1	·	2.6 km	MPC · JPL
859579	2013 PB_{97}	—	December 29, 2014	Haleakala	Pan-STARRS 1	TIR	1.7 km	MPC · JPL
859580	2013 PN_{98}	—	August 9, 2013	Haleakala	Pan-STARRS 1	·	1.3 km	MPC · JPL
859581	2013 PA_{101}	—	August 12, 2013	Haleakala	Pan-STARRS 1	·	990 m	MPC · JPL
859582	2013 PL_{101}	—	August 15, 2013	Haleakala	Pan-STARRS 1	·	1.7 km	MPC · JPL
859583	2013 PQ_{101}	—	August 12, 2013	Haleakala	Pan-STARRS 1	·	1.3 km	MPC · JPL
859584	2013 PT_{101}	—	August 12, 2013	Haleakala	Pan-STARRS 1	EOS	1.3 km	MPC · JPL
859585	2013 PG_{102}	—	August 15, 2013	Haleakala	Pan-STARRS 1	KOR	910 m	MPC · JPL
859586	2013 PR_{102}	—	August 8, 2013	Haleakala	Pan-STARRS 1	·	1.9 km	MPC · JPL
859587	2013 PS_{102}	—	August 9, 2013	Haleakala	Pan-STARRS 1	·	2.1 km	MPC · JPL
859588	2013 PD_{103}	—	August 12, 2013	Haleakala	Pan-STARRS 1	·	1.3 km	MPC · JPL
859589	2013 PQ_{103}	—	August 15, 2013	Haleakala	Pan-STARRS 1	MAS	530 m	MPC · JPL
859590	2013 PM_{106}	—	August 15, 2013	Haleakala	Pan-STARRS 1	HYG	1.7 km	MPC · JPL
859591	2013 PY_{106}	—	August 4, 2013	Haleakala	Pan-STARRS 1	·	1.1 km	MPC · JPL
859592	2013 PN_{111}	—	August 9, 2013	Haleakala	Pan-STARRS 1	·	1.2 km	MPC · JPL
859593	2013 PC_{112}	—	August 2, 2013	Piszkéstető	K. Sárneczky	·	880 m	MPC · JPL
859594	2013 PF_{112}	—	August 4, 2013	Haleakala	Pan-STARRS 1	·	400 m	MPC · JPL
859595	2013 PO_{113}	—	August 12, 2013	Haleakala	Pan-STARRS 1	(13314)	1.3 km	MPC · JPL
859596	2013 PR_{113}	—	August 15, 2013	Haleakala	Pan-STARRS 1	·	2.2 km	MPC · JPL
859597	2013 PN_{117}	—	August 15, 2013	Haleakala	Pan-STARRS 1	AGN	780 m	MPC · JPL
859598	2013 PM_{118}	—	August 15, 2013	Haleakala	Pan-STARRS 1	KOR	930 m	MPC · JPL
859599	2013 PW_{120}	—	August 10, 2013	Kitt Peak	Spacewatch	·	1.9 km	MPC · JPL
859600	2013 PL_{122}	—	August 15, 2013	Haleakala	Pan-STARRS 1	·	1.5 km	MPC · JPL

== 859601–859700 ==
back to top

Designation			Discovery			Properties		Ref
Permanent	Provisional	Named after	Date	Site	Discoverer(s)	Category	Diam.	Ref
859601	2013 PK_{124}	—	August 2, 2013	Haleakala	Pan-STARRS 1	·	820 m	MPC · JPL
859602	2013 PN_{124}	—	August 12, 2013	Haleakala	Pan-STARRS 1	·	2.3 km	MPC · JPL
859603	2013 PV_{124}	—	August 9, 2013	Haleakala	Pan-STARRS 1	·	1.6 km	MPC · JPL
859604	2013 PY_{124}	—	August 9, 2013	Haleakala	Pan-STARRS 1	·	2.4 km	MPC · JPL
859605	2013 PA_{125}	—	August 9, 2013	Haleakala	Pan-STARRS 1	·	1.9 km	MPC · JPL
859606	2013 PQ_{126}	—	August 14, 2013	Haleakala	Pan-STARRS 1	·	2.0 km	MPC · JPL
859607	2013 PT_{126}	—	August 14, 2013	Haleakala	Pan-STARRS 1	·	490 m	MPC · JPL
859608	2013 PE_{127}	—	December 20, 2014	Haleakala	Pan-STARRS 1	·	2.0 km	MPC · JPL
859609	2013 PF_{129}	—	November 11, 2009	Mount Lemmon	Mount Lemmon Survey	·	1.0 km	MPC · JPL
859610	2013 PM_{129}	—	August 8, 2013	Haleakala	Pan-STARRS 1	·	1.3 km	MPC · JPL
859611	2013 PW_{131}	—	August 9, 2013	Haleakala	Pan-STARRS 1	·	1.0 km	MPC · JPL
859612	2013 PL_{132}	—	August 9, 2013	Haleakala	Pan-STARRS 1	·	610 m	MPC · JPL
859613	2013 PZ_{134}	—	August 12, 2013	Haleakala	Pan-STARRS 1	·	630 m	MPC · JPL
859614	2013 QD	—	August 16, 2013	Elena Remote	Oreshko, A.	·	2.4 km	MPC · JPL
859615	2013 QM_{4}	—	July 28, 2013	Kitt Peak	Spacewatch	·	2.2 km	MPC · JPL
859616	2013 QR_{4}	—	August 12, 2013	Haleakala	Pan-STARRS 1	·	950 m	MPC · JPL
859617	2013 QT_{4}	—	November 9, 2009	Kitt Peak	Spacewatch	·	1.1 km	MPC · JPL
859618	2013 QG_{5}	—	August 12, 2013	Haleakala	Pan-STARRS 1	·	470 m	MPC · JPL
859619	2013 QN_{8}	—	April 27, 2006	Cerro Tololo	Deep Ecliptic Survey	·	2.0 km	MPC · JPL
859620	2013 QV_{8}	—	August 9, 2013	Kitt Peak	Spacewatch	(1547)	1.3 km	MPC · JPL
859621	2013 QO_{9}	—	August 15, 2013	Haleakala	Pan-STARRS 1	·	2.1 km	MPC · JPL
859622	2013 QZ_{12}	—	October 17, 2006	Kitt Peak	Spacewatch	NYS	610 m	MPC · JPL
859623	2013 QS_{13}	—	August 26, 2013	Haleakala	Pan-STARRS 1	·	420 m	MPC · JPL
859624	2013 QZ_{16}	—	August 29, 2013	Haleakala	Pan-STARRS 1	H	290 m	MPC · JPL
859625	2013 QE_{20}	—	October 23, 2008	Kitt Peak	Spacewatch	·	2.1 km	MPC · JPL
859626	2013 QC_{25}	—	August 14, 2013	Haleakala	Pan-STARRS 1	·	2.5 km	MPC · JPL
859627	2013 QE_{27}	—	October 13, 2006	Kitt Peak	Spacewatch	MAS	430 m	MPC · JPL
859628	2013 QA_{32}	—	August 29, 2013	Haleakala	Pan-STARRS 1	·	400 m	MPC · JPL
859629	2013 QS_{32}	—	August 1, 2013	Haleakala	Pan-STARRS 1	T_{j} (2.95)	2.3 km	MPC · JPL
859630	2013 QD_{33}	—	August 12, 2013	Haleakala	Pan-STARRS 1	MAR	790 m	MPC · JPL
859631	2013 QA_{35}	—	August 31, 2013	Haleakala	Pan-STARRS 1	·	1.7 km	MPC · JPL
859632	2013 QS_{37}	—	September 24, 2009	Mount Lemmon	Mount Lemmon Survey	JUN	870 m	MPC · JPL
859633	2013 QE_{38}	—	August 1, 2013	Haleakala	Pan-STARRS 1	TIR	2.5 km	MPC · JPL
859634	2013 QG_{38}	—	October 10, 2008	Mount Lemmon	Mount Lemmon Survey	·	2.2 km	MPC · JPL
859635	2013 QR_{39}	—	August 12, 2013	Haleakala	Pan-STARRS 1	·	2.1 km	MPC · JPL
859636	2013 QJ_{43}	—	February 27, 2009	Mount Lemmon	Mount Lemmon Survey	·	530 m	MPC · JPL
859637	2013 QP_{43}	—	August 28, 2013	Mount Lemmon	Mount Lemmon Survey	·	630 m	MPC · JPL
859638	2013 QR_{45}	—	August 31, 2013	Haleakala	Pan-STARRS 1	·	1.7 km	MPC · JPL
859639	2013 QZ_{45}	—	August 31, 2013	Haleakala	Pan-STARRS 1	·	810 m	MPC · JPL
859640	2013 QN_{46}	—	August 9, 2013	Haleakala	Pan-STARRS 1	H	380 m	MPC · JPL
859641 Vydūnas	2013 QW_{47}	Vydūnas	August 29, 2013	Baldone	K. Černis, I. Eglītis	LIX	2.2 km	MPC · JPL
859642	2013 QH_{48}	—	August 29, 2013	Haleakala	Pan-STARRS 1	AMO	550 m	MPC · JPL
859643	2013 QB_{49}	—	May 23, 2006	Mount Lemmon	Mount Lemmon Survey	·	450 m	MPC · JPL
859644	2013 QQ_{49}	—	August 12, 2013	Haleakala	Pan-STARRS 1	·	1.6 km	MPC · JPL
859645	2013 QR_{49}	—	August 12, 2013	Haleakala	Pan-STARRS 1	·	690 m	MPC · JPL
859646	2013 QY_{51}	—	August 30, 2013	Haleakala	Pan-STARRS 1	·	2.8 km	MPC · JPL
859647	2013 QU_{61}	—	August 27, 2013	Haleakala	Pan-STARRS 1	·	2.5 km	MPC · JPL
859648	2013 QG_{63}	—	June 20, 2013	Haleakala	Pan-STARRS 1	·	800 m	MPC · JPL
859649	2013 QR_{63}	—	June 20, 2013	Haleakala	Pan-STARRS 1	·	540 m	MPC · JPL
859650	2013 QW_{63}	—	June 20, 2013	Haleakala	Pan-STARRS 1	·	1.4 km	MPC · JPL
859651	2013 QF_{64}	—	December 14, 2010	Mount Lemmon	Mount Lemmon Survey	NYS	860 m	MPC · JPL
859652	2013 QP_{64}	—	August 27, 2013	Haleakala	Pan-STARRS 1	·	2.3 km	MPC · JPL
859653	2013 QQ_{72}	—	August 14, 2013	Haleakala	Pan-STARRS 1	·	950 m	MPC · JPL
859654	2013 QT_{73}	—	August 8, 2013	Kitt Peak	Spacewatch	·	1.4 km	MPC · JPL
859655	2013 QX_{76}	—	August 28, 2013	Mount Lemmon	Mount Lemmon Survey	·	810 m	MPC · JPL
859656	2013 QF_{82}	—	August 31, 2013	Haleakala	Pan-STARRS 1	·	2.3 km	MPC · JPL
859657	2013 QW_{83}	—	August 28, 2013	Catalina	CSS	·	820 m	MPC · JPL
859658	2013 QY_{86}	—	August 26, 2013	Haleakala	Pan-STARRS 1	·	2.2 km	MPC · JPL
859659	2013 QE_{90}	—	August 12, 2013	Haleakala	Pan-STARRS 1	·	810 m	MPC · JPL
859660	2013 QS_{91}	—	August 29, 2013	Haleakala	Pan-STARRS 1	NYS	670 m	MPC · JPL
859661	2013 QV_{91}	—	August 29, 2013	Haleakala	Pan-STARRS 1	·	2.0 km	MPC · JPL
859662	2013 QH_{94}	—	October 28, 2008	Mount Lemmon	Mount Lemmon Survey	THM	1.6 km	MPC · JPL
859663	2013 QU_{96}	—	August 26, 2013	Haleakala	Pan-STARRS 1	·	1.1 km	MPC · JPL
859664	2013 QV_{97}	—	August 31, 2013	Haleakala	Pan-STARRS 1	ELF	2.9 km	MPC · JPL
859665	2013 QX_{97}	—	April 20, 2017	Haleakala	Pan-STARRS 1	·	1.6 km	MPC · JPL
859666	2013 QF_{98}	—	November 21, 2014	Mount Lemmon	Mount Lemmon Survey	·	1.9 km	MPC · JPL
859667	2013 QH_{98}	—	August 26, 2013	Haleakala	Pan-STARRS 1	·	2.4 km	MPC · JPL
859668	2013 QP_{98}	—	January 17, 2015	Haleakala	Pan-STARRS 1	EUN	980 m	MPC · JPL
859669	2013 QE_{99}	—	February 5, 2016	Haleakala	Pan-STARRS 1	·	2.2 km	MPC · JPL
859670	2013 QX_{99}	—	August 28, 2013	Mount Lemmon	Mount Lemmon Survey	·	1.8 km	MPC · JPL
859671	2013 QB_{100}	—	August 17, 2013	Haleakala	Pan-STARRS 1	·	3.0 km	MPC · JPL
859672	2013 QJ_{100}	—	August 30, 2013	Haleakala	Pan-STARRS 1	·	1.4 km	MPC · JPL
859673	2013 QL_{100}	—	August 30, 2013	Oukaïmeden	M. Ory	·	680 m	MPC · JPL
859674	2013 QB_{102}	—	August 28, 2013	Mount Lemmon	Mount Lemmon Survey	·	460 m	MPC · JPL
859675	2013 QL_{103}	—	August 26, 2013	Haleakala	Pan-STARRS 1	·	2.1 km	MPC · JPL
859676	2013 QY_{103}	—	August 17, 2013	Haleakala	Pan-STARRS 1	H	310 m	MPC · JPL
859677	2013 QJ_{104}	—	August 28, 2013	Mount Lemmon	Mount Lemmon Survey	EOS	1.3 km	MPC · JPL
859678	2013 QQ_{104}	—	August 29, 2013	Haleakala	Pan-STARRS 1	H	370 m	MPC · JPL
859679	2013 QV_{104}	—	August 28, 2013	Mount Lemmon	Mount Lemmon Survey	HYG	2.0 km	MPC · JPL
859680	2013 QD_{107}	—	August 28, 2013	Mount Lemmon	Mount Lemmon Survey	·	1.1 km	MPC · JPL
859681	2013 RH_{1}	—	September 1, 2013	Mount Lemmon	Mount Lemmon Survey	EUP	3.2 km	MPC · JPL
859682	2013 RD_{2}	—	July 20, 2006	Siding Spring	SSS	·	620 m	MPC · JPL
859683	2013 RH_{4}	—	October 28, 2008	Kitt Peak	Spacewatch	·	1.5 km	MPC · JPL
859684	2013 RG_{6}	—	September 1, 2013	Mountain Meadows	Skillman, D.	·	2.2 km	MPC · JPL
859685	2013 RJ_{6}	—	September 1, 2013	Haleakala	Pan-STARRS 1	T_{j} (2.99)	2.5 km	MPC · JPL
859686	2013 RP_{6}	—	April 13, 2008	Mount Lemmon	Mount Lemmon Survey	·	1.0 km	MPC · JPL
859687	2013 RL_{7}	—	November 20, 2006	Kitt Peak	Spacewatch	·	860 m	MPC · JPL
859688	2013 RO_{7}	—	August 15, 2013	Haleakala	Pan-STARRS 1	·	440 m	MPC · JPL
859689	2013 RW_{7}	—	August 15, 2013	Haleakala	Pan-STARRS 1	V	450 m	MPC · JPL
859690	2013 RC_{10}	—	September 1, 2013	Mount Lemmon	Mount Lemmon Survey	V	440 m	MPC · JPL
859691	2013 RL_{10}	—	September 1, 2013	Haleakala	Pan-STARRS 1	·	670 m	MPC · JPL
859692	2013 RG_{15}	—	August 7, 2013	Kitt Peak	Spacewatch	·	1.1 km	MPC · JPL
859693	2013 RJ_{15}	—	August 12, 2013	Haleakala	Pan-STARRS 1	V	430 m	MPC · JPL
859694	2013 RJ_{16}	—	August 15, 2013	Haleakala	Pan-STARRS 1	H	320 m	MPC · JPL
859695	2013 RO_{20}	—	August 12, 2013	Kitt Peak	Spacewatch	·	2.1 km	MPC · JPL
859696	2013 RR_{21}	—	October 16, 2006	Kitt Peak	Spacewatch	NYS	720 m	MPC · JPL
859697	2013 RX_{21}	—	September 7, 2008	Catalina	CSS	·	1.5 km	MPC · JPL
859698	2013 RD_{27}	—	September 4, 2013	Calar Alto	F. Hormuth	·	750 m	MPC · JPL
859699	2013 RK_{27}	—	September 4, 2013	Mount Lemmon	Mount Lemmon Survey	·	700 m	MPC · JPL
859700	2013 RM_{34}	—	August 14, 2013	Haleakala	Pan-STARRS 1	·	2.4 km	MPC · JPL

== 859701–859800 ==
back to top

Designation			Discovery			Properties		Ref
Permanent	Provisional	Named after	Date	Site	Discoverer(s)	Category	Diam.	Ref
859701	2013 RD_{37}	—	September 11, 2007	Kitt Peak	Spacewatch	·	2.2 km	MPC · JPL
859702	2013 RN_{37}	—	September 28, 2008	Mount Lemmon	Mount Lemmon Survey	·	1.7 km	MPC · JPL
859703	2013 RN_{42}	—	February 15, 2012	Haleakala	Pan-STARRS 1	·	490 m	MPC · JPL
859704	2013 RN_{45}	—	November 20, 2000	Socorro	LINEAR	·	1.3 km	MPC · JPL
859705	2013 RT_{47}	—	September 10, 2013	Haleakala	Pan-STARRS 1	NYS	990 m	MPC · JPL
859706	2013 RF_{53}	—	September 4, 2002	Palomar	NEAT	·	1.5 km	MPC · JPL
859707	2013 RR_{54}	—	November 7, 2008	Mount Lemmon	Mount Lemmon Survey	·	2.3 km	MPC · JPL
859708	2013 RY_{55}	—	September 10, 2013	Haleakala	Pan-STARRS 1	·	1.5 km	MPC · JPL
859709	2013 RM_{57}	—	September 12, 2007	Mount Lemmon	Mount Lemmon Survey	·	2.1 km	MPC · JPL
859710	2013 RM_{60}	—	September 8, 2013	Haleakala	Pan-STARRS 1	·	1.2 km	MPC · JPL
859711	2013 RL_{66}	—	August 15, 2013	Haleakala	Pan-STARRS 1	·	850 m	MPC · JPL
859712	2013 RP_{68}	—	September 9, 2013	Haleakala	Pan-STARRS 1	·	2.0 km	MPC · JPL
859713	2013 RV_{71}	—	September 14, 2013	Kitt Peak	Spacewatch	·	1.9 km	MPC · JPL
859714	2013 RV_{72}	—	September 1, 2013	Mount Lemmon	Mount Lemmon Survey	LIX	2.5 km	MPC · JPL
859715	2013 RR_{73}	—	September 3, 2013	La Sagra	OAM	·	680 m	MPC · JPL
859716	2013 RZ_{73}	—	September 14, 2013	Catalina	CSS	APO · PHA	220 m	MPC · JPL
859717	2013 RW_{77}	—	September 1, 2013	Mount Lemmon	Mount Lemmon Survey	·	910 m	MPC · JPL
859718	2013 RB_{81}	—	August 15, 2013	Haleakala	Pan-STARRS 1	·	1.8 km	MPC · JPL
859719	2013 RP_{81}	—	January 1, 2003	La Silla	F. Hormuth	·	2.3 km	MPC · JPL
859720	2013 RA_{84}	—	September 13, 2013	Kitt Peak	Spacewatch	(2076)	440 m	MPC · JPL
859721	2013 RT_{86}	—	September 13, 2013	Kitt Peak	Spacewatch	·	2.1 km	MPC · JPL
859722	2013 RT_{90}	—	October 27, 2008	Kitt Peak	Spacewatch	·	1.6 km	MPC · JPL
859723	2013 RR_{92}	—	September 14, 2013	Kitt Peak	Spacewatch	·	2.3 km	MPC · JPL
859724	2013 RT_{98}	—	September 14, 2013	Haleakala	Pan-STARRS 1	H	450 m	MPC · JPL
859725	2013 RX_{98}	—	September 13, 2013	Mount Lemmon	Mount Lemmon Survey	T_{j} (2.98) · 3:2	3.9 km	MPC · JPL
859726	2013 RH_{99}	—	September 1, 2013	Haleakala	Pan-STARRS 1	·	2.0 km	MPC · JPL
859727	2013 RQ_{102}	—	September 15, 2013	Haleakala	Pan-STARRS 1	·	1.5 km	MPC · JPL
859728	2013 RQ_{104}	—	April 28, 2012	Kitt Peak	Spacewatch	·	1.7 km	MPC · JPL
859729	2013 RM_{106}	—	September 4, 2007	Mount Lemmon	Mount Lemmon Survey	THM	1.8 km	MPC · JPL
859730	2013 RF_{107}	—	September 1, 2013	Mount Lemmon	Mount Lemmon Survey	·	940 m	MPC · JPL
859731	2013 RH_{108}	—	March 23, 2012	Mount Lemmon	Mount Lemmon Survey	·	920 m	MPC · JPL
859732	2013 RO_{108}	—	September 1, 2013	Mount Lemmon	Mount Lemmon Survey	·	1.4 km	MPC · JPL
859733	2013 RR_{110}	—	January 20, 2015	Haleakala	Pan-STARRS 1	·	970 m	MPC · JPL
859734	2013 RA_{111}	—	September 12, 2013	Catalina	CSS	·	980 m	MPC · JPL
859735	2013 RT_{111}	—	September 1, 2013	Mount Lemmon	Mount Lemmon Survey	L5	5.7 km	MPC · JPL
859736	2013 RC_{112}	—	September 14, 2013	Haleakala	Pan-STARRS 1	·	630 m	MPC · JPL
859737	2013 RB_{114}	—	September 14, 2013	Haleakala	Pan-STARRS 1	·	460 m	MPC · JPL
859738	2013 RO_{114}	—	September 9, 2013	Haleakala	Pan-STARRS 1	HYG	2.1 km	MPC · JPL
859739	2013 RE_{116}	—	September 6, 2013	Kitt Peak	Spacewatch	·	2.5 km	MPC · JPL
859740	2013 RK_{117}	—	September 6, 2013	Kitt Peak	Spacewatch	·	820 m	MPC · JPL
859741	2013 RA_{118}	—	September 14, 2013	Haleakala	Pan-STARRS 1	·	560 m	MPC · JPL
859742	2013 RC_{118}	—	September 14, 2013	Mount Lemmon	Mount Lemmon Survey	·	710 m	MPC · JPL
859743	2013 RM_{118}	—	September 12, 2013	Catalina	CSS	·	900 m	MPC · JPL
859744	2013 RH_{119}	—	September 14, 2013	Mount Lemmon	Mount Lemmon Survey	·	2.1 km	MPC · JPL
859745	2013 RM_{119}	—	September 14, 2013	Haleakala	Pan-STARRS 1	·	2.4 km	MPC · JPL
859746	2013 RU_{119}	—	June 1, 2012	Mount Lemmon	Mount Lemmon Survey	·	2.0 km	MPC · JPL
859747	2013 RN_{120}	—	September 6, 2013	Mount Lemmon	Mount Lemmon Survey	·	650 m	MPC · JPL
859748	2013 RX_{120}	—	September 3, 2013	Kitt Peak	Spacewatch	·	1.9 km	MPC · JPL
859749	2013 RB_{121}	—	September 3, 2013	Haleakala	Pan-STARRS 1	THB	1.7 km	MPC · JPL
859750	2013 RU_{121}	—	March 19, 2017	Haleakala	Pan-STARRS 1	·	2.3 km	MPC · JPL
859751	2013 RC_{122}	—	March 5, 2017	Haleakala	Pan-STARRS 1	·	2.1 km	MPC · JPL
859752	2013 RT_{122}	—	September 6, 2013	Mount Lemmon	Mount Lemmon Survey	·	1.2 km	MPC · JPL
859753	2013 RU_{122}	—	September 14, 2013	Haleakala	Pan-STARRS 1	·	1.4 km	MPC · JPL
859754	2013 RP_{125}	—	September 3, 2013	Calar Alto	F. Hormuth	·	1.7 km	MPC · JPL
859755	2013 RV_{125}	—	November 29, 2014	Mount Lemmon	Mount Lemmon Survey	·	1.4 km	MPC · JPL
859756	2013 RX_{125}	—	September 14, 2013	Haleakala	Pan-STARRS 1	LUT	2.7 km	MPC · JPL
859757	2013 RY_{125}	—	September 1, 2013	Mount Lemmon	Mount Lemmon Survey	·	2.5 km	MPC · JPL
859758	2013 RZ_{125}	—	September 14, 2013	Haleakala	Pan-STARRS 1	·	2.0 km	MPC · JPL
859759	2013 RG_{126}	—	July 12, 2018	Haleakala	Pan-STARRS 1	·	2.0 km	MPC · JPL
859760	2013 RR_{128}	—	September 14, 2013	Haleakala	Pan-STARRS 1	·	1.2 km	MPC · JPL
859761	2013 RC_{129}	—	September 14, 2013	Haleakala	Pan-STARRS 1	·	2.8 km	MPC · JPL
859762	2013 RG_{129}	—	September 14, 2013	Mount Lemmon	Mount Lemmon Survey	·	2.1 km	MPC · JPL
859763	2013 RR_{129}	—	September 5, 2013	Kitt Peak	Spacewatch	·	2.6 km	MPC · JPL
859764	2013 RY_{129}	—	September 5, 2013	Kitt Peak	Spacewatch	THM	2.2 km	MPC · JPL
859765	2013 RO_{130}	—	September 15, 2013	Mount Lemmon	Mount Lemmon Survey	·	1.9 km	MPC · JPL
859766	2013 RH_{133}	—	September 1, 2013	Haleakala	Pan-STARRS 1	·	1.5 km	MPC · JPL
859767	2013 RL_{133}	—	September 14, 2013	Haleakala	Pan-STARRS 1	·	2.4 km	MPC · JPL
859768	2013 RU_{133}	—	September 2, 2013	Mount Lemmon	Mount Lemmon Survey	MAS	510 m	MPC · JPL
859769	2013 RY_{133}	—	September 12, 2013	Mount Lemmon	Mount Lemmon Survey	·	2.4 km	MPC · JPL
859770	2013 RF_{134}	—	September 4, 2013	Mount Lemmon	Mount Lemmon Survey	L5	6.5 km	MPC · JPL
859771	2013 RQ_{134}	—	September 1, 2013	Mount Lemmon	Mount Lemmon Survey	·	1.3 km	MPC · JPL
859772	2013 RU_{134}	—	September 6, 2013	Mount Lemmon	Mount Lemmon Survey	·	960 m	MPC · JPL
859773	2013 RY_{134}	—	September 15, 2013	Haleakala	Pan-STARRS 1	·	490 m	MPC · JPL
859774	2013 RB_{135}	—	September 5, 2013	Kitt Peak	Spacewatch	·	580 m	MPC · JPL
859775	2013 RQ_{135}	—	September 3, 2013	Calar Alto	F. Hormuth	MAS	500 m	MPC · JPL
859776	2013 RS_{135}	—	September 15, 2013	Kitt Peak	Spacewatch	·	700 m	MPC · JPL
859777	2013 RO_{136}	—	September 14, 2013	Mount Lemmon	Mount Lemmon Survey	MAS	520 m	MPC · JPL
859778	2013 RG_{137}	—	September 3, 2013	Haleakala	Pan-STARRS 1	NYS	690 m	MPC · JPL
859779	2013 RM_{138}	—	September 14, 2013	Haleakala	Pan-STARRS 1	·	900 m	MPC · JPL
859780	2013 RX_{138}	—	September 1, 2013	Mount Lemmon	Mount Lemmon Survey	V	470 m	MPC · JPL
859781	2013 RA_{139}	—	September 2, 2013	Haleakala	Pan-STARRS 1	H	370 m	MPC · JPL
859782	2013 RL_{141}	—	September 15, 2013	Mount Lemmon	Mount Lemmon Survey	·	600 m	MPC · JPL
859783	2013 RF_{142}	—	September 13, 2013	Mount Lemmon	Mount Lemmon Survey	·	2.0 km	MPC · JPL
859784	2013 RP_{142}	—	September 9, 2013	Haleakala	Pan-STARRS 1	V	460 m	MPC · JPL
859785	2013 RB_{144}	—	September 14, 2013	Haleakala	Pan-STARRS 1	·	2.8 km	MPC · JPL
859786	2013 RE_{146}	—	September 7, 2008	Mount Lemmon	Mount Lemmon Survey	KOR	1.0 km	MPC · JPL
859787	2013 RV_{147}	—	September 14, 2013	Mount Lemmon	Mount Lemmon Survey	·	2.3 km	MPC · JPL
859788	2013 RW_{147}	—	September 14, 2013	Haleakala	Pan-STARRS 1	EOS	1.5 km	MPC · JPL
859789	2013 RG_{149}	—	September 9, 2013	Haleakala	Pan-STARRS 1	AGN	870 m	MPC · JPL
859790	2013 RS_{149}	—	September 1, 2013	Haleakala	Pan-STARRS 1	·	1.3 km	MPC · JPL
859791	2013 RX_{150}	—	September 15, 2013	Mount Lemmon	Mount Lemmon Survey	·	1.2 km	MPC · JPL
859792	2013 RY_{150}	—	September 3, 2013	Haleakala	Pan-STARRS 1	·	1.6 km	MPC · JPL
859793	2013 RY_{151}	—	September 4, 2013	Calar Alto	F. Hormuth	·	1.4 km	MPC · JPL
859794	2013 RB_{152}	—	September 14, 2013	Haleakala	Pan-STARRS 1	EOS	1.2 km	MPC · JPL
859795	2013 RF_{154}	—	September 14, 2013	Haleakala	Pan-STARRS 1	EOS	1.3 km	MPC · JPL
859796	2013 RE_{155}	—	September 2, 2013	Mount Lemmon	Mount Lemmon Survey	·	630 m	MPC · JPL
859797	2013 RL_{155}	—	September 3, 2013	Haleakala	Pan-STARRS 1	·	2.3 km	MPC · JPL
859798	2013 RZ_{157}	—	September 14, 2013	Haleakala	Pan-STARRS 1	·	920 m	MPC · JPL
859799	2013 RW_{159}	—	September 15, 2013	Mount Lemmon	Mount Lemmon Survey	·	2.7 km	MPC · JPL
859800	2013 RO_{160}	—	September 12, 2013	Mount Lemmon	Mount Lemmon Survey	·	1.4 km	MPC · JPL

== 859801–859900 ==
back to top

Designation			Discovery			Properties		Ref
Permanent	Provisional	Named after	Date	Site	Discoverer(s)	Category	Diam.	Ref
859801	2013 RH_{161}	—	September 14, 2013	Haleakala	Pan-STARRS 1	·	840 m	MPC · JPL
859802	2013 RY_{161}	—	September 3, 2013	Mount Lemmon	Mount Lemmon Survey	·	750 m	MPC · JPL
859803	2013 RJ_{162}	—	September 1, 2013	Mount Lemmon	Mount Lemmon Survey	·	2.2 km	MPC · JPL
859804	2013 RZ_{163}	—	September 2, 2013	Mount Lemmon	Mount Lemmon Survey	·	2.1 km	MPC · JPL
859805	2013 RH_{175}	—	September 13, 2013	Mount Lemmon	Mount Lemmon Survey	·	2.2 km	MPC · JPL
859806	2013 RV_{185}	—	September 4, 2013	Piszkéstető	K. Sárneczky	·	3.2 km	MPC · JPL
859807	2013 SE	—	March 15, 2004	Kitt Peak	Spacewatch	H	390 m	MPC · JPL
859808	2013 SR_{5}	—	September 17, 2013	Mount Lemmon	Mount Lemmon Survey	·	1.1 km	MPC · JPL
859809	2013 SZ_{5}	—	September 17, 2013	Mount Lemmon	Mount Lemmon Survey	VER	2.0 km	MPC · JPL
859810	2013 SH_{7}	—	November 10, 2009	Kitt Peak	Spacewatch	(5)	860 m	MPC · JPL
859811	2013 SY_{7}	—	September 17, 2013	Mount Lemmon	Mount Lemmon Survey	·	2.1 km	MPC · JPL
859812	2013 SM_{13}	—	August 14, 2013	Haleakala	Pan-STARRS 1	·	1.5 km	MPC · JPL
859813	2013 SB_{14}	—	September 10, 2013	Haleakala	Pan-STARRS 1	·	550 m	MPC · JPL
859814	2013 SZ_{16}	—	September 2, 2013	Mount Lemmon	Mount Lemmon Survey	·	1.2 km	MPC · JPL
859815	2013 SK_{19}	—	September 21, 2013	Haleakala	Pan-STARRS 1	AMO	630 m	MPC · JPL
859816	2013 SF_{23}	—	September 9, 2013	Haleakala	Pan-STARRS 1	·	1.1 km	MPC · JPL
859817	2013 SM_{31}	—	August 9, 2013	Catalina	CSS	·	620 m	MPC · JPL
859818	2013 SR_{33}	—	September 16, 2013	Mount Lemmon	Mount Lemmon Survey	·	1.2 km	MPC · JPL
859819	2013 SL_{36}	—	February 5, 2011	Mount Lemmon	Mount Lemmon Survey	MAS	520 m	MPC · JPL
859820	2013 SV_{44}	—	April 1, 2011	Mount Lemmon	Mount Lemmon Survey	·	2.6 km	MPC · JPL
859821	2013 SK_{45}	—	September 1, 2013	Mount Lemmon	Mount Lemmon Survey	·	1.2 km	MPC · JPL
859822	2013 SM_{46}	—	September 9, 2013	Haleakala	Pan-STARRS 1	·	2.2 km	MPC · JPL
859823	2013 SD_{47}	—	September 14, 2007	Mount Lemmon	Mount Lemmon Survey	·	2.0 km	MPC · JPL
859824	2013 SG_{47}	—	March 21, 2001	Kitt Peak	SKADS	MAS	500 m	MPC · JPL
859825	2013 SR_{48}	—	September 28, 2013	Mount Lemmon	Mount Lemmon Survey	·	460 m	MPC · JPL
859826	2013 SJ_{49}	—	September 28, 2006	Mount Lemmon	Mount Lemmon Survey	·	740 m	MPC · JPL
859827	2013 ST_{51}	—	September 28, 2013	Catalina	CSS	·	1.2 km	MPC · JPL
859828	2013 SN_{53}	—	September 29, 2013	Mount Lemmon	Mount Lemmon Survey	·	760 m	MPC · JPL
859829	2013 SY_{53}	—	September 29, 2013	Mount Lemmon	Mount Lemmon Survey	THM	1.8 km	MPC · JPL
859830	2013 SU_{55}	—	February 28, 2008	Mount Lemmon	Mount Lemmon Survey	·	530 m	MPC · JPL
859831	2013 SJ_{62}	—	September 9, 2013	Haleakala	Pan-STARRS 1	·	1.3 km	MPC · JPL
859832	2013 SO_{68}	—	September 9, 2013	Haleakala	Pan-STARRS 1	·	1 km	MPC · JPL
859833	2013 SC_{74}	—	October 18, 2009	Mount Lemmon	Mount Lemmon Survey	·	1.0 km	MPC · JPL
859834	2013 SQ_{75}	—	August 10, 2013	Palomar	Palomar Transient Factory	·	1.8 km	MPC · JPL
859835	2013 SD_{78}	—	September 28, 2013	Kitt Peak	Spacewatch	·	1.4 km	MPC · JPL
859836	2013 SB_{81}	—	September 24, 2013	Mount Lemmon	Mount Lemmon Survey	PHO	640 m	MPC · JPL
859837	2013 SU_{83}	—	September 10, 2013	Palomar	Palomar Transient Factory	·	680 m	MPC · JPL
859838	2013 SF_{85}	—	September 3, 2013	Calar Alto	F. Hormuth	·	930 m	MPC · JPL
859839	2013 SO_{86}	—	September 8, 2008	Kitt Peak	Spacewatch	·	1.5 km	MPC · JPL
859840	2013 SY_{90}	—	September 2, 2013	Mount Lemmon	Mount Lemmon Survey	·	2.4 km	MPC · JPL
859841	2013 SK_{91}	—	March 15, 2012	Mount Lemmon	Mount Lemmon Survey	·	1.8 km	MPC · JPL
859842	2013 SF_{94}	—	September 27, 2019	Haleakala	Pan-STARRS 1	·	2.2 km	MPC · JPL
859843	2013 SH_{95}	—	September 15, 2013	Kitt Peak	Spacewatch	DOR	1.7 km	MPC · JPL
859844	2013 SV_{103}	—	September 26, 2013	Mayhill-ISON	L. Elenin	·	650 m	MPC · JPL
859845	2013 SW_{103}	—	September 28, 2013	Mount Lemmon	Mount Lemmon Survey	BAR	700 m	MPC · JPL
859846	2013 SC_{105}	—	November 26, 2014	Haleakala	Pan-STARRS 1	·	1.8 km	MPC · JPL
859847	2013 SD_{105}	—	October 8, 2013	Haleakala	Pan-STARRS 1	·	2.2 km	MPC · JPL
859848	2013 SK_{105}	—	September 27, 2013	Haleakala	Pan-STARRS 1	·	2.3 km	MPC · JPL
859849	2013 SO_{106}	—	February 16, 2015	Haleakala	Pan-STARRS 1	·	660 m	MPC · JPL
859850	2013 SY_{106}	—	September 30, 2013	Catalina	CSS	·	1.9 km	MPC · JPL
859851	2013 SZ_{106}	—	September 30, 2013	Catalina	CSS	·	1.9 km	MPC · JPL
859852	2013 SA_{107}	—	September 12, 2013	Catalina	CSS	·	2.4 km	MPC · JPL
859853	2013 SK_{107}	—	September 27, 2013	Haleakala	Pan-STARRS 1	·	1.9 km	MPC · JPL
859854	2013 ST_{107}	—	September 25, 2013	Mount Lemmon	Mount Lemmon Survey	·	1.9 km	MPC · JPL
859855	2013 SJ_{108}	—	September 17, 2013	Mount Lemmon	Mount Lemmon Survey	L5	6.9 km	MPC · JPL
859856	2013 SS_{108}	—	September 28, 2013	Piszkéstető	K. Sárneczky	V	430 m	MPC · JPL
859857	2013 SA_{109}	—	September 24, 2013	Mount Lemmon	Mount Lemmon Survey	·	480 m	MPC · JPL
859858	2013 SJ_{109}	—	September 28, 2013	Mount Lemmon	Mount Lemmon Survey	·	820 m	MPC · JPL
859859	2013 SQ_{109}	—	September 17, 2013	Mount Lemmon	Mount Lemmon Survey	·	2.0 km	MPC · JPL
859860	2013 SG_{111}	—	September 24, 2013	Mount Lemmon	Mount Lemmon Survey	·	2.0 km	MPC · JPL
859861	2013 TW	—	September 15, 2009	Mount Lemmon	Mount Lemmon Survey	·	960 m	MPC · JPL
859862	2013 TV_{6}	—	November 9, 2009	Mount Lemmon	Mount Lemmon Survey	·	830 m	MPC · JPL
859863	2013 TT_{10}	—	October 3, 2013	Kitt Peak	Spacewatch	·	1.6 km	MPC · JPL
859864	2013 TN_{13}	—	September 24, 2013	Haleakala	Pan-STARRS 1	·	790 m	MPC · JPL
859865	2013 TT_{17}	—	October 29, 2008	Kitt Peak	Spacewatch	·	1.2 km	MPC · JPL
859866	2013 TH_{18}	—	October 1, 2013	Mount Lemmon	Mount Lemmon Survey	·	2.0 km	MPC · JPL
859867	2013 TY_{21}	—	October 1, 2013	Mount Lemmon	Mount Lemmon Survey	EOS	1.2 km	MPC · JPL
859868	2013 TJ_{24}	—	October 1, 2013	Kitt Peak	Spacewatch	·	470 m	MPC · JPL
859869	2013 TW_{24}	—	September 14, 2013	Mount Lemmon	Mount Lemmon Survey	NYS	810 m	MPC · JPL
859870	2013 TR_{25}	—	March 17, 2012	Mount Lemmon	Mount Lemmon Survey	·	440 m	MPC · JPL
859871	2013 TJ_{29}	—	October 1, 2013	Kitt Peak	Spacewatch	·	850 m	MPC · JPL
859872	2013 TG_{30}	—	October 1, 2013	Kitt Peak	Spacewatch	·	740 m	MPC · JPL
859873	2013 TR_{31}	—	October 2, 2013	Kitt Peak	Spacewatch	·	1.0 km	MPC · JPL
859874	2013 TL_{33}	—	September 3, 2013	Mount Lemmon	Mount Lemmon Survey	NYS	910 m	MPC · JPL
859875	2013 TR_{36}	—	September 13, 2013	Catalina	CSS	PHO	660 m	MPC · JPL
859876	2013 TZ_{38}	—	September 14, 2013	Haleakala	Pan-STARRS 1	·	2.1 km	MPC · JPL
859877	2013 TL_{41}	—	October 2, 2013	Mount Lemmon	Mount Lemmon Survey	·	1.6 km	MPC · JPL
859878	2013 TD_{45}	—	October 3, 2013	Mount Lemmon	Mount Lemmon Survey	·	810 m	MPC · JPL
859879	2013 TB_{46}	—	September 12, 1998	Kitt Peak	Spacewatch	NYS	850 m	MPC · JPL
859880	2013 TO_{47}	—	October 3, 2013	Mount Lemmon	Mount Lemmon Survey	·	2.2 km	MPC · JPL
859881	2013 TG_{48}	—	October 17, 2009	Catalina	CSS	·	1.2 km	MPC · JPL
859882	2013 TD_{52}	—	October 4, 2013	Mount Lemmon	Mount Lemmon Survey	·	2.2 km	MPC · JPL
859883	2013 TO_{52}	—	October 4, 2013	Kitt Peak	Spacewatch	·	2.0 km	MPC · JPL
859884	2013 TY_{53}	—	October 4, 2013	Mount Lemmon	Mount Lemmon Survey	·	1.1 km	MPC · JPL
859885	2013 TR_{56}	—	October 4, 2013	Mount Lemmon	Mount Lemmon Survey	L5	6.5 km	MPC · JPL
859886	2013 TT_{59}	—	February 20, 2012	Haleakala	Pan-STARRS 1	H	370 m	MPC · JPL
859887	2013 TA_{60}	—	October 4, 2013	Mount Lemmon	Mount Lemmon Survey	(5)	700 m	MPC · JPL
859888	2013 TE_{60}	—	October 25, 2008	Kitt Peak	Spacewatch	·	1.4 km	MPC · JPL
859889	2013 TM_{60}	—	October 4, 2013	Mount Lemmon	Mount Lemmon Survey	·	1.7 km	MPC · JPL
859890	2013 TE_{68}	—	November 19, 2009	Kitt Peak	Spacewatch	·	1.3 km	MPC · JPL
859891	2013 TE_{70}	—	September 1, 2013	Mount Lemmon	Mount Lemmon Survey	·	1.6 km	MPC · JPL
859892	2013 TA_{77}	—	October 5, 2013	Mount Lemmon	Mount Lemmon Survey	PHO	650 m	MPC · JPL
859893	2013 TC_{77}	—	October 5, 2013	Mount Lemmon	Mount Lemmon Survey	·	1.4 km	MPC · JPL
859894	2013 TD_{77}	—	March 15, 2012	Mount Lemmon	Mount Lemmon Survey	H	370 m	MPC · JPL
859895	2013 TZ_{77}	—	February 7, 2011	Mount Lemmon	Mount Lemmon Survey	NYS	760 m	MPC · JPL
859896	2013 TS_{79}	—	September 24, 2013	Haleakala	Pan-STARRS 1	·	370 m	MPC · JPL
859897	2013 TE_{84}	—	February 5, 2011	Mount Lemmon	Mount Lemmon Survey	·	650 m	MPC · JPL
859898	2013 TS_{85}	—	April 14, 2008	Mount Lemmon	Mount Lemmon Survey	·	1.0 km	MPC · JPL
859899	2013 TY_{91}	—	October 1, 2013	Mount Lemmon	Mount Lemmon Survey	·	920 m	MPC · JPL
859900	2013 TT_{93}	—	October 1, 2013	Kitt Peak	Spacewatch	·	1.4 km	MPC · JPL

== 859901–860000 ==
back to top

Designation			Discovery			Properties		Ref
Permanent	Provisional	Named after	Date	Site	Discoverer(s)	Category	Diam.	Ref
859901	2013 TW_{93}	—	October 1, 2013	Kitt Peak	Spacewatch	·	2.4 km	MPC · JPL
859902	2013 TX_{96}	—	August 9, 2013	Catalina	CSS	·	1.8 km	MPC · JPL
859903	2013 TH_{103}	—	October 2, 2013	Mount Lemmon	Mount Lemmon Survey	EOS	1.4 km	MPC · JPL
859904	2013 TK_{103}	—	October 1, 2013	Catalina	CSS	·	690 m	MPC · JPL
859905	2013 TQ_{105}	—	October 3, 2013	Mount Lemmon	Mount Lemmon Survey	V	480 m	MPC · JPL
859906	2013 TD_{108}	—	October 3, 2013	Kitt Peak	Spacewatch	L5	5.7 km	MPC · JPL
859907	2013 TM_{113}	—	October 3, 2013	Haleakala	Pan-STARRS 1	L5	8.8 km	MPC · JPL
859908	2013 TV_{114}	—	October 3, 2013	Haleakala	Pan-STARRS 1	L5	5.5 km	MPC · JPL
859909	2013 TN_{119}	—	February 7, 2011	Mount Lemmon	Mount Lemmon Survey	·	650 m	MPC · JPL
859910	2013 TQ_{123}	—	March 21, 2010	Kitt Peak	Spacewatch	·	2.1 km	MPC · JPL
859911	2013 TQ_{124}	—	October 5, 2013	Haleakala	Pan-STARRS 1	·	2.4 km	MPC · JPL
859912	2013 TT_{125}	—	October 5, 2013	Mount Lemmon	Mount Lemmon Survey	·	1.5 km	MPC · JPL
859913	2013 TJ_{126}	—	November 9, 2004	Mauna Kea	Veillet, C.	·	1.3 km	MPC · JPL
859914	2013 TM_{128}	—	September 6, 2013	Kitt Peak	Spacewatch	·	2.4 km	MPC · JPL
859915	2013 TX_{128}	—	October 5, 2013	Oukaïmeden	C. Rinner	·	2.3 km	MPC · JPL
859916	2013 TZ_{128}	—	September 15, 2013	Catalina	CSS	T_{j} (2.99) · EUP	2.7 km	MPC · JPL
859917	2013 TY_{129}	—	September 3, 2013	Kitt Peak	Spacewatch	·	1.0 km	MPC · JPL
859918	2013 TE_{130}	—	September 15, 2013	Catalina	CSS	·	560 m	MPC · JPL
859919	2013 TY_{133}	—	February 5, 2011	Haleakala	Pan-STARRS 1	·	620 m	MPC · JPL
859920	2013 TZ_{133}	—	September 15, 2013	Haleakala	Pan-STARRS 1	·	2.1 km	MPC · JPL
859921	2013 TD_{136}	—	September 5, 2013	Kitt Peak	Spacewatch	·	590 m	MPC · JPL
859922	2013 TJ_{137}	—	October 3, 2013	Catalina	CSS	·	1.5 km	MPC · JPL
859923	2013 TW_{138}	—	October 2, 2013	Haleakala	Pan-STARRS 1	·	910 m	MPC · JPL
859924	2013 TT_{140}	—	September 6, 2013	Mount Lemmon	Mount Lemmon Survey	·	500 m	MPC · JPL
859925	2013 TV_{143}	—	November 15, 2006	Mount Lemmon	Mount Lemmon Survey	·	620 m	MPC · JPL
859926	2013 TK_{158}	—	November 9, 2013	Haleakala	Pan-STARRS 1	EUN	770 m	MPC · JPL
859927	2013 TN_{159}	—	October 2, 2013	Mount Lemmon	Mount Lemmon Survey	L5	5.9 km	MPC · JPL
859928	2013 TK_{160}	—	October 1, 2013	Kitt Peak	Spacewatch	·	1.1 km	MPC · JPL
859929	2013 TY_{160}	—	October 3, 2013	Mount Lemmon	Mount Lemmon Survey	·	1.7 km	MPC · JPL
859930	2013 TH_{161}	—	October 9, 2013	Mount Lemmon	Mount Lemmon Survey	·	1.3 km	MPC · JPL
859931	2013 TD_{163}	—	March 15, 2008	Kitt Peak	Spacewatch	V	550 m	MPC · JPL
859932	2013 TF_{164}	—	October 3, 2013	Haleakala	Pan-STARRS 1	·	900 m	MPC · JPL
859933	2013 TS_{166}	—	October 3, 2013	Kitt Peak	Spacewatch	·	1.3 km	MPC · JPL
859934	2013 TW_{166}	—	October 3, 2013	Kitt Peak	Spacewatch	·	2.2 km	MPC · JPL
859935	2013 TM_{167}	—	October 31, 2008	Kitt Peak	Spacewatch	·	1.3 km	MPC · JPL
859936	2013 TU_{171}	—	October 12, 2013	Catalina	CSS	·	1.0 km	MPC · JPL
859937	2013 TT_{172}	—	October 6, 2013	Mount Lemmon	Mount Lemmon Survey	RAF	660 m	MPC · JPL
859938	2013 TU_{172}	—	October 9, 2013	Mount Lemmon	Mount Lemmon Survey	(194)	1.1 km	MPC · JPL
859939	2013 TJ_{173}	—	October 8, 2013	Mount Lemmon	Mount Lemmon Survey	(5)	800 m	MPC · JPL
859940	2013 TR_{173}	—	October 7, 2013	Mount Lemmon	Mount Lemmon Survey	(13314)	1.2 km	MPC · JPL
859941	2013 TY_{173}	—	September 10, 2004	Kitt Peak	Spacewatch	·	1.1 km	MPC · JPL
859942	2013 TN_{175}	—	October 1, 2013	Mount Lemmon	Mount Lemmon Survey	·	960 m	MPC · JPL
859943	2013 TG_{176}	—	October 2, 2013	Mount Lemmon	Mount Lemmon Survey	·	510 m	MPC · JPL
859944	2013 TL_{177}	—	October 13, 2013	Kitt Peak	Spacewatch	·	1.2 km	MPC · JPL
859945	2013 TW_{177}	—	March 15, 2015	Haleakala	Pan-STARRS 1	·	960 m	MPC · JPL
859946	2013 TN_{180}	—	October 4, 2013	Catalina	CSS	H	370 m	MPC · JPL
859947	2013 TC_{181}	—	October 3, 2013	Mount Lemmon	Mount Lemmon Survey	·	680 m	MPC · JPL
859948	2013 TZ_{181}	—	October 2, 2013	Kitt Peak	Spacewatch	(895)	2.9 km	MPC · JPL
859949	2013 TS_{182}	—	October 1, 2013	Mount Lemmon	Mount Lemmon Survey	·	1.2 km	MPC · JPL
859950	2013 TX_{182}	—	October 31, 2008	Kitt Peak	Spacewatch	·	2.0 km	MPC · JPL
859951	2013 TE_{183}	—	July 27, 2017	Haleakala	Pan-STARRS 1	·	1.2 km	MPC · JPL
859952	2013 TH_{184}	—	October 3, 2013	Haleakala	Pan-STARRS 1	·	1.3 km	MPC · JPL
859953	2013 TM_{184}	—	October 3, 2013	Haleakala	Pan-STARRS 1	V	480 m	MPC · JPL
859954	2013 TW_{184}	—	October 7, 2013	Mount Lemmon	Mount Lemmon Survey	·	980 m	MPC · JPL
859955	2013 TM_{186}	—	October 12, 2013	Mount Lemmon	Mount Lemmon Survey	·	1.5 km	MPC · JPL
859956	2013 TV_{186}	—	October 2, 2013	Haleakala	Pan-STARRS 1	EUN	960 m	MPC · JPL
859957	2013 TA_{187}	—	October 3, 2013	Haleakala	Pan-STARRS 1	·	820 m	MPC · JPL
859958	2013 TK_{188}	—	October 1, 2013	Mount Lemmon	Mount Lemmon Survey	·	460 m	MPC · JPL
859959	2013 TX_{188}	—	August 23, 2017	Haleakala	Pan-STARRS 1	·	1.2 km	MPC · JPL
859960	2013 TY_{188}	—	October 4, 2013	Mount Lemmon	Mount Lemmon Survey	·	2.2 km	MPC · JPL
859961	2013 TD_{191}	—	October 3, 2013	Kitt Peak	Spacewatch	·	2.1 km	MPC · JPL
859962	2013 TF_{194}	—	October 5, 2013	Haleakala	Pan-STARRS 1	·	1.2 km	MPC · JPL
859963	2013 TL_{194}	—	October 9, 2013	Kitt Peak	Spacewatch	AGN	750 m	MPC · JPL
859964	2013 TO_{194}	—	October 5, 2013	Haleakala	Pan-STARRS 1	·	2.2 km	MPC · JPL
859965	2013 TZ_{196}	—	October 1, 2013	Mount Lemmon	Mount Lemmon Survey	·	2.0 km	MPC · JPL
859966	2013 TF_{197}	—	October 3, 2013	Kitt Peak	Spacewatch	L5	6.7 km	MPC · JPL
859967	2013 TX_{198}	—	October 9, 2013	Kitt Peak	Spacewatch	·	2.2 km	MPC · JPL
859968	2013 TD_{199}	—	October 3, 2013	Haleakala	Pan-STARRS 1	L5	5.9 km	MPC · JPL
859969	2013 TM_{199}	—	October 5, 2013	Kitt Peak	Spacewatch	·	1.6 km	MPC · JPL
859970	2013 TO_{199}	—	October 3, 2013	Mount Lemmon	Mount Lemmon Survey	NYS	630 m	MPC · JPL
859971	2013 TP_{199}	—	October 3, 2013	Mount Lemmon	Mount Lemmon Survey	·	1.9 km	MPC · JPL
859972	2013 TQ_{200}	—	October 1, 2013	Mount Lemmon	Mount Lemmon Survey	·	650 m	MPC · JPL
859973	2013 TD_{201}	—	October 3, 2013	Mount Lemmon	Mount Lemmon Survey	·	760 m	MPC · JPL
859974	2013 TP_{201}	—	October 3, 2013	Haleakala	Pan-STARRS 1	·	660 m	MPC · JPL
859975	2013 TT_{202}	—	October 3, 2013	Mount Lemmon	Mount Lemmon Survey	·	840 m	MPC · JPL
859976	2013 TB_{203}	—	October 3, 2013	Haleakala	Pan-STARRS 1	·	810 m	MPC · JPL
859977	2013 TG_{203}	—	October 1, 2013	Kitt Peak	Spacewatch	·	810 m	MPC · JPL
859978	2013 TK_{203}	—	October 13, 2013	Kitt Peak	Spacewatch	·	590 m	MPC · JPL
859979	2013 TL_{203}	—	October 13, 2013	Kitt Peak	Spacewatch	·	640 m	MPC · JPL
859980	2013 TW_{203}	—	October 3, 2013	Kitt Peak	Spacewatch	·	740 m	MPC · JPL
859981	2013 TY_{204}	—	October 3, 2013	Haleakala	Pan-STARRS 1	EOS	1.3 km	MPC · JPL
859982	2013 TT_{205}	—	October 3, 2013	Haleakala	Pan-STARRS 1	L5	6.7 km	MPC · JPL
859983	2013 TV_{206}	—	October 5, 2013	Haleakala	Pan-STARRS 1	·	910 m	MPC · JPL
859984	2013 TL_{207}	—	October 3, 2013	Haleakala	Pan-STARRS 1	·	700 m	MPC · JPL
859985	2013 TB_{208}	—	October 2, 2013	Haleakala	Pan-STARRS 1	·	550 m	MPC · JPL
859986	2013 TP_{208}	—	October 1, 2013	Mount Lemmon	Mount Lemmon Survey	V	420 m	MPC · JPL
859987	2013 TP_{210}	—	October 5, 2013	Haleakala	Pan-STARRS 1	·	2.4 km	MPC · JPL
859988	2013 TP_{212}	—	October 3, 2013	Haleakala	Pan-STARRS 1	·	510 m	MPC · JPL
859989	2013 TW_{212}	—	October 5, 2013	Haleakala	Pan-STARRS 1	·	380 m	MPC · JPL
859990	2013 TR_{217}	—	October 5, 2013	Haleakala	Pan-STARRS 1	L5	6.3 km	MPC · JPL
859991	2013 TU_{217}	—	October 2, 2013	Kitt Peak	Spacewatch	·	2.4 km	MPC · JPL
859992	2013 TV_{217}	—	October 1, 2013	Mount Lemmon	Mount Lemmon Survey	·	510 m	MPC · JPL
859993	2013 TC_{222}	—	October 3, 2013	Haleakala	Pan-STARRS 1	·	600 m	MPC · JPL
859994	2013 TV_{222}	—	October 5, 2013	Haleakala	Pan-STARRS 1	·	1.1 km	MPC · JPL
859995	2013 TB_{223}	—	October 5, 2013	Haleakala	Pan-STARRS 1	L5	6.1 km	MPC · JPL
859996	2013 TO_{224}	—	October 5, 2013	Haleakala	Pan-STARRS 1	·	1.1 km	MPC · JPL
859997	2013 TC_{230}	—	October 3, 2013	Haleakala	Pan-STARRS 1	·	2.7 km	MPC · JPL
859998	2013 TR_{230}	—	October 3, 2013	Kitt Peak	Spacewatch	·	680 m	MPC · JPL
859999	2013 TS_{231}	—	October 3, 2013	Kitt Peak	Spacewatch	·	990 m	MPC · JPL
860000	2013 TD_{232}	—	October 4, 2013	Mount Lemmon	Mount Lemmon Survey	·	1.4 km	MPC · JPL

== Meaning of names ==
As minor planet discoveries are confirmed, they are given a permanent number by the IAU's Minor Planet Center (MPC), and the discoverers can then submit names for them, following the IAU's naming conventions. The list below concerns those minor planets in the specified number-range that have received names, and explains the meanings of those names.

Official naming citations of newly named small Solar System bodies are approved and published in a bulletin by IAU's Working Group for Small Bodies Nomenclature (WGSBN). Before May 2021, citations were published in MPC's Minor Planet Circulars for many decades. Recent citations can also be found on the JPL Small-Body Database (SBDB). Until his death in 2016, German astronomer Lutz D. Schmadel compiled these citations into the Dictionary of Minor Planet Names (DMP) and regularly updated the collection.

Based on Paul Herget's The Names of the Minor Planets, Schmadel also researched the unclear origin of numerous asteroids, most of which had been named prior to World War II. This article incorporates text from this source, which is in the public domain: SBDB New namings may only be added to this list below after official publication as the preannouncement of names is condemned. The WGSBN publishes a comprehensive guideline for the naming rules of non-cometary small Solar System bodies.

Named minor planet	Provisional	This minor planet was named for...	Ref · Catalog
859641 Vydūnas	2013 QW_{47}	Wilhelm Storost (1868–1953), who wrote under the pseudonym Vydūnas, was a prominent Lithuanian writer, philosopher, educator.	IAU · 859641
