= Vente =

Vente may refer to:

== People ==
- Dylan Vente (born 1999), Dutch footballer
- Leen Vente (1911–1989), Dutch footballer

== Other uses ==
- Ventė Cape, headland in Lithuania
- Vente Pa' Ca, song
- Vente Venezuela, political party
- Vente a Alemania, Pepe, film
- Vente de Agosto, holiday
