= Juknaičiai Eldership =

Eldership of Lithuania

The Juknaičiai Eldership (Lithuanian: Juknaičių seniūnija) is an eldership of Lithuania, located in the Šilutė District Municipality. In 2021 its population was 2178.
