= Ventė Cape =

Cape in Lithuania

Coordinates: 55°21′N 21°12′E

- Cape
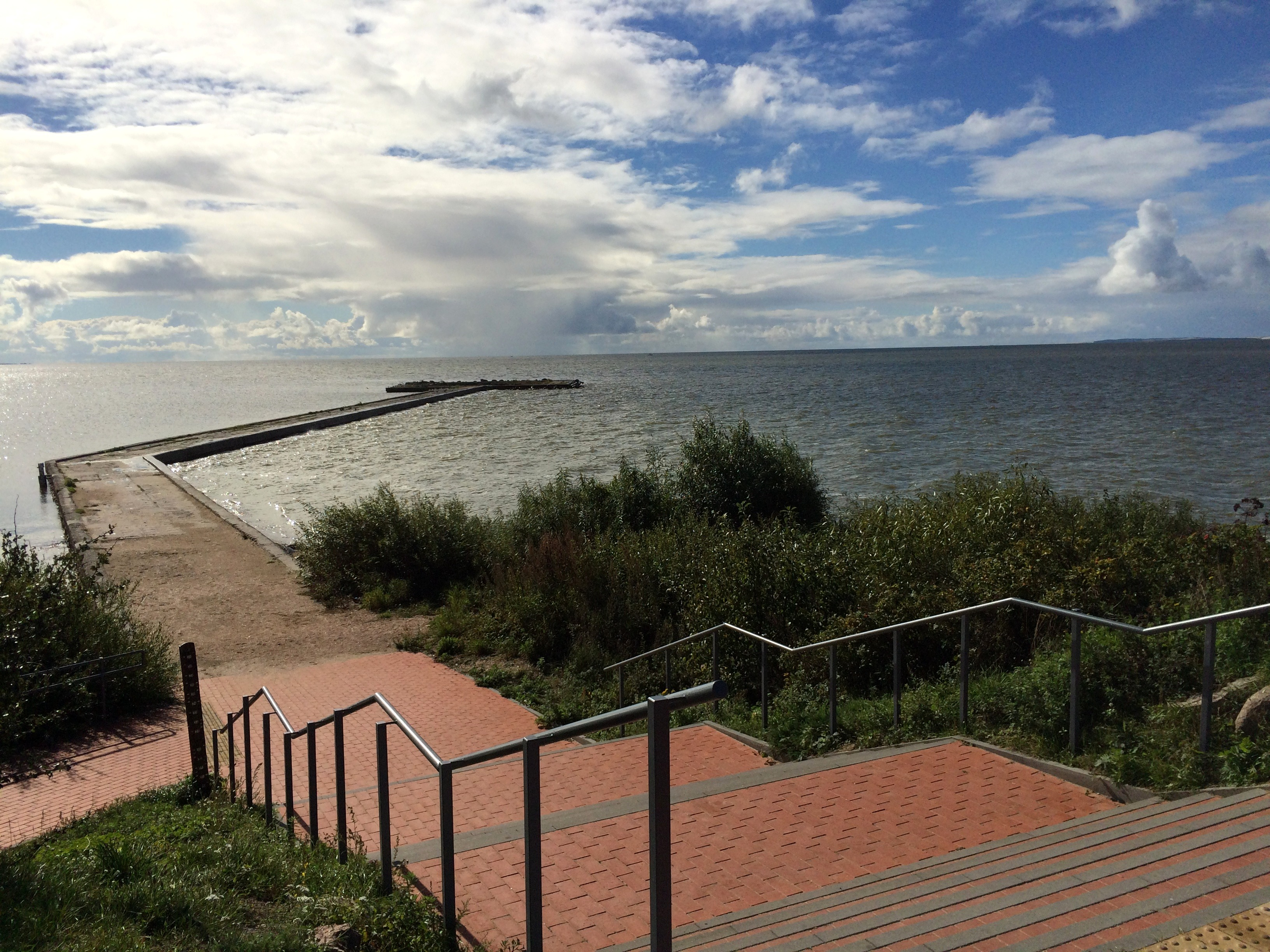
- Pier next to Ventė Cape Lighthouse

- Ventė Cape (Kintai Eldership), in Šilutė District Municipality
- Location: Šilutė District Municipality, Lithuania
- Water bodies: Kniaupas Bay; Minija River; Curonian Lagoon

Area
  - Total: 12.1 km^{2} (4.7 sq mi)

Dimensions
  - Length: 5.5 kilometres (3.4 mi)
  - Width: 2.5 kilometres (1.6 mi) (at widest point)
- Elevation: 5 m (16 ft)

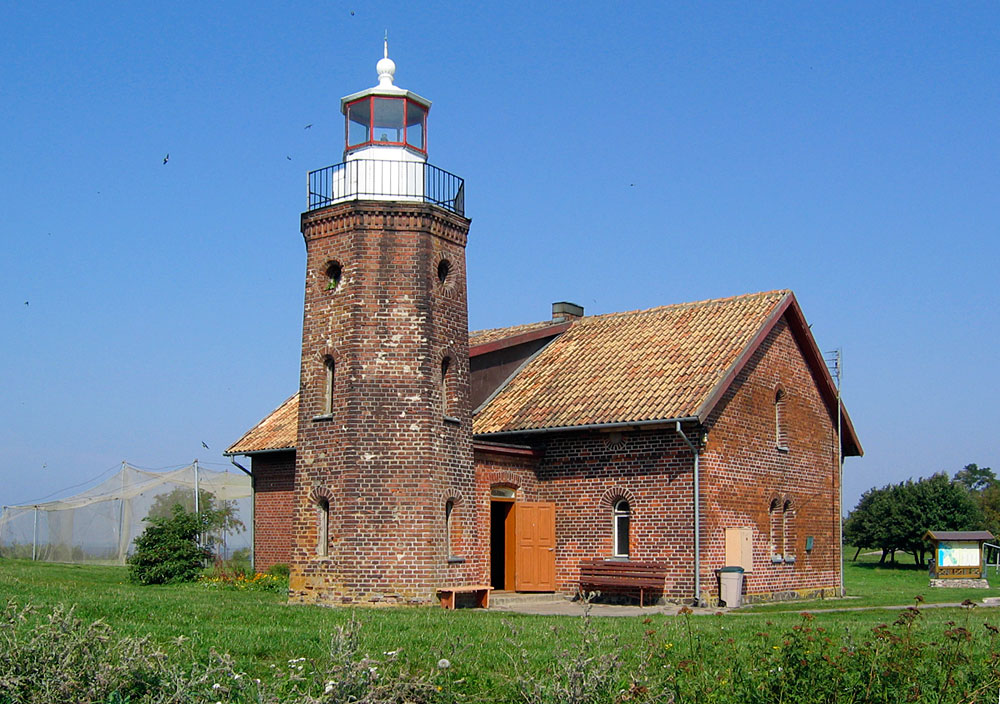
The lighthouse at Ventė Cape

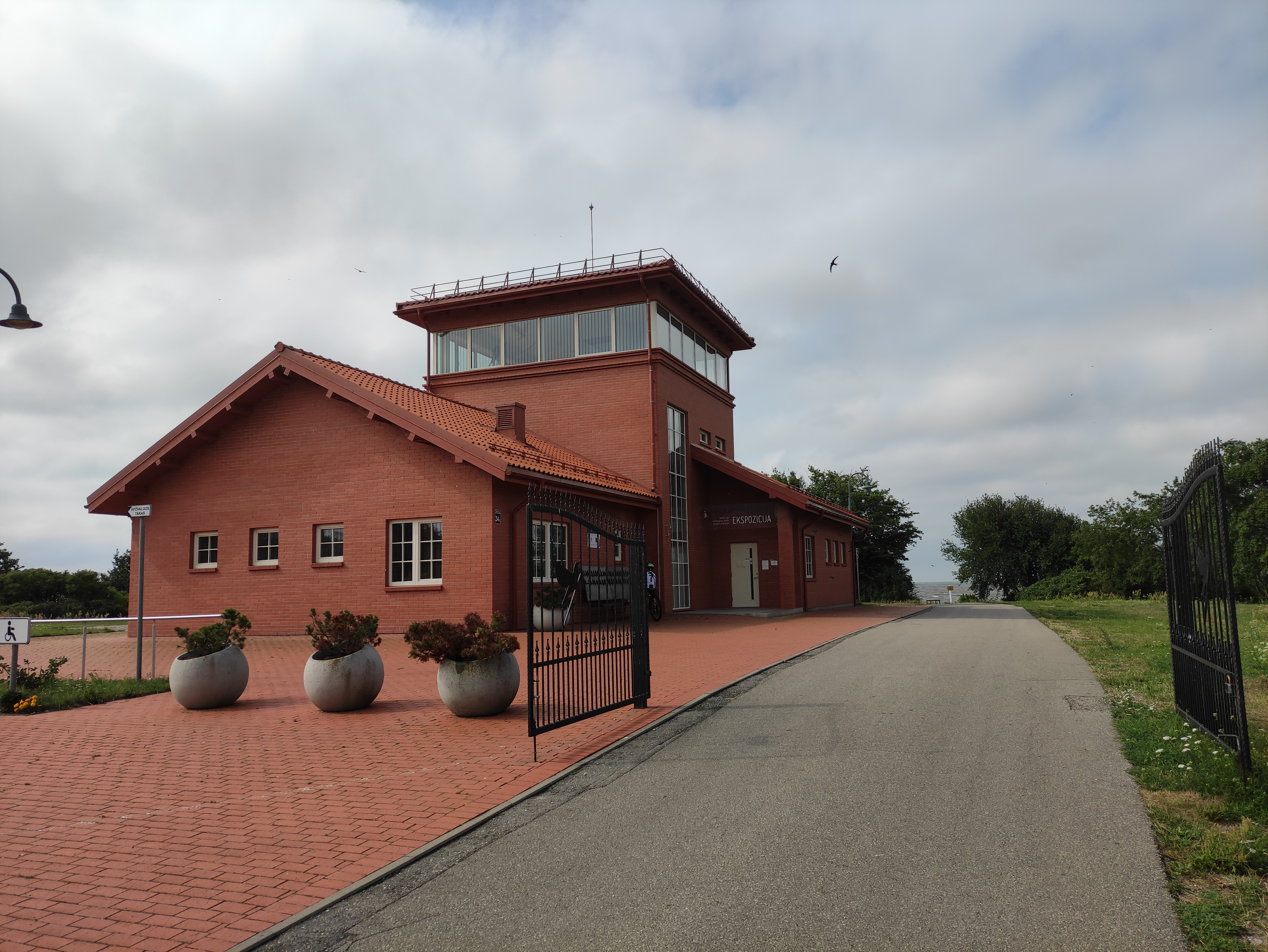
Ornithological station and a museum

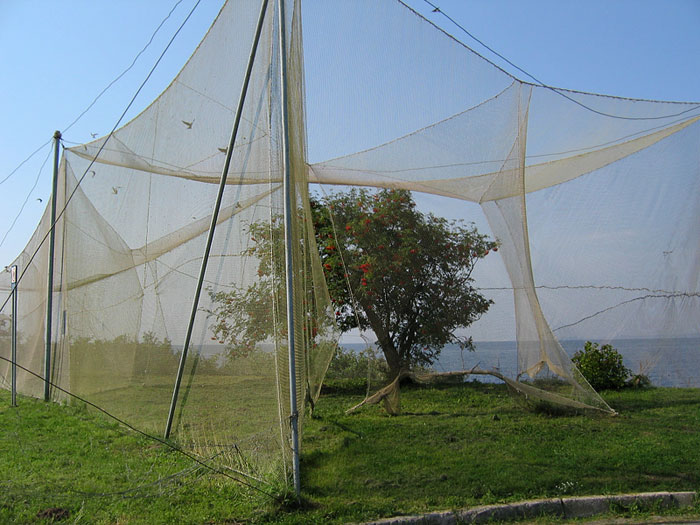
Nets in the bird ringing station

Ventė Cape (Lithuanian: Ventės ragas, German: Windenburger Eck), sometimes referred to as Ventė Horn or Ventė Peninsula, is a peninsula in the Nemunas Delta, in Šilutė district, Lithuania. It is known as a resting place for birds during their migration, particularly in autumn. Ventė Cape Ornithological Station – one of the first bird ringing stations in Europe still in operation – was opened here by Tadas Ivanauskas in 1929.

Cape Ventė was formed 4,500-5,000 years ago when the Curonian Lagoon flooded a ridge of coastal moraine formations during the last stage of the Baltic Sea glaciation. In the 1980s and 1990s, the tip of Cape Vente was reinforced, the banks were raised and paved with stones. A 250 meters long breakwater has been built, which also acts as an icebreaker at the end of winter, breaking up large blocks of ice. This process helped to halt the deterioration of the Cape Ventė Peninsula. Cape Ventė has a red brick lighthouse standing at 11 m high, built in 1863, with an observation deck on top. The Ventė Cape Lighthouse is one of the few lighthouses in Lithuania where visitors are permitted to climb up to the observation deck. The main bird migration route in Lithuania (part of one of the most important bird migration routes in Northern Europe across the White and Baltic Seas) passes through Cape Ventė.

The Cape, being in the former Memel Territory, was part of Germany until 1919. The Teutonic Knights erected a castle here, called Windenburg, but it no longer exists.

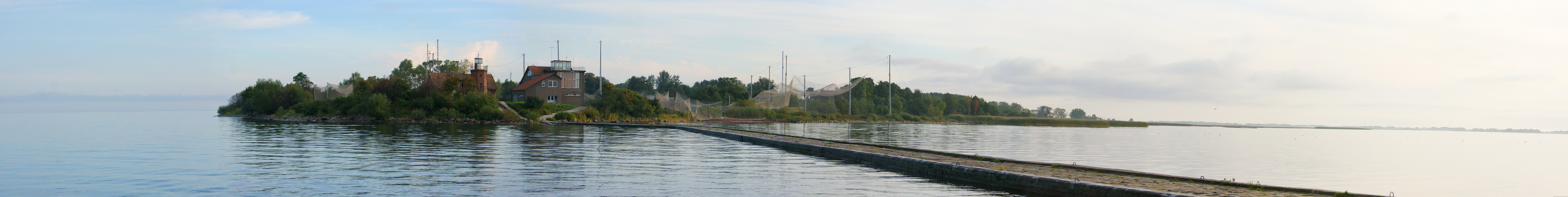
Ventė Cape in autumn morning, Heligoland traps visible
