= Vydūnas =

Prussian-Lithuanian teacher, poet, humanist, philosopher and writer

Vilius Storostas-Vydūnas
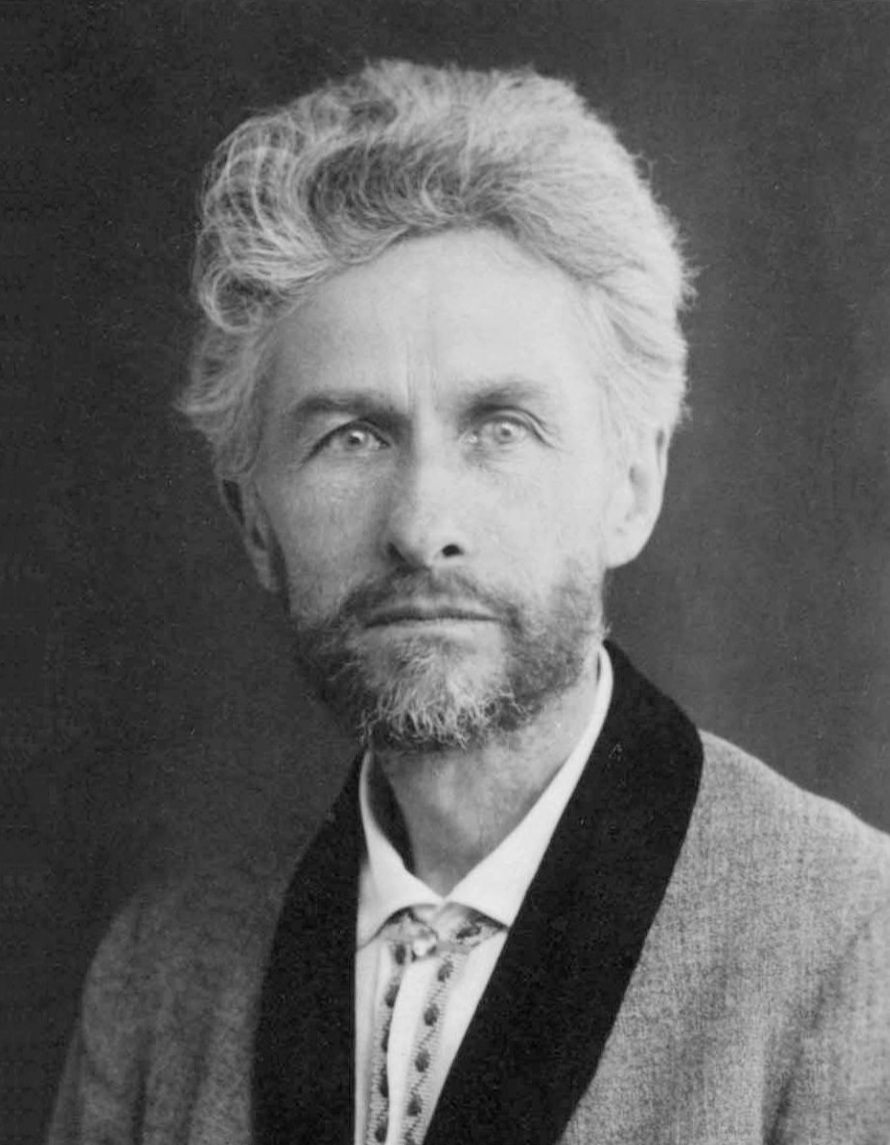
- Vydūnas in 1930
- Born: Wilhelm Storost; 22 March 1868; Jonaten, Kingdom of Prussia
- Died: 20 February 1953 (aged 84); Detmold, West Germany
- Resting place: Bitėnai (reburied 1991)
- Spouse: Klara Füllhase

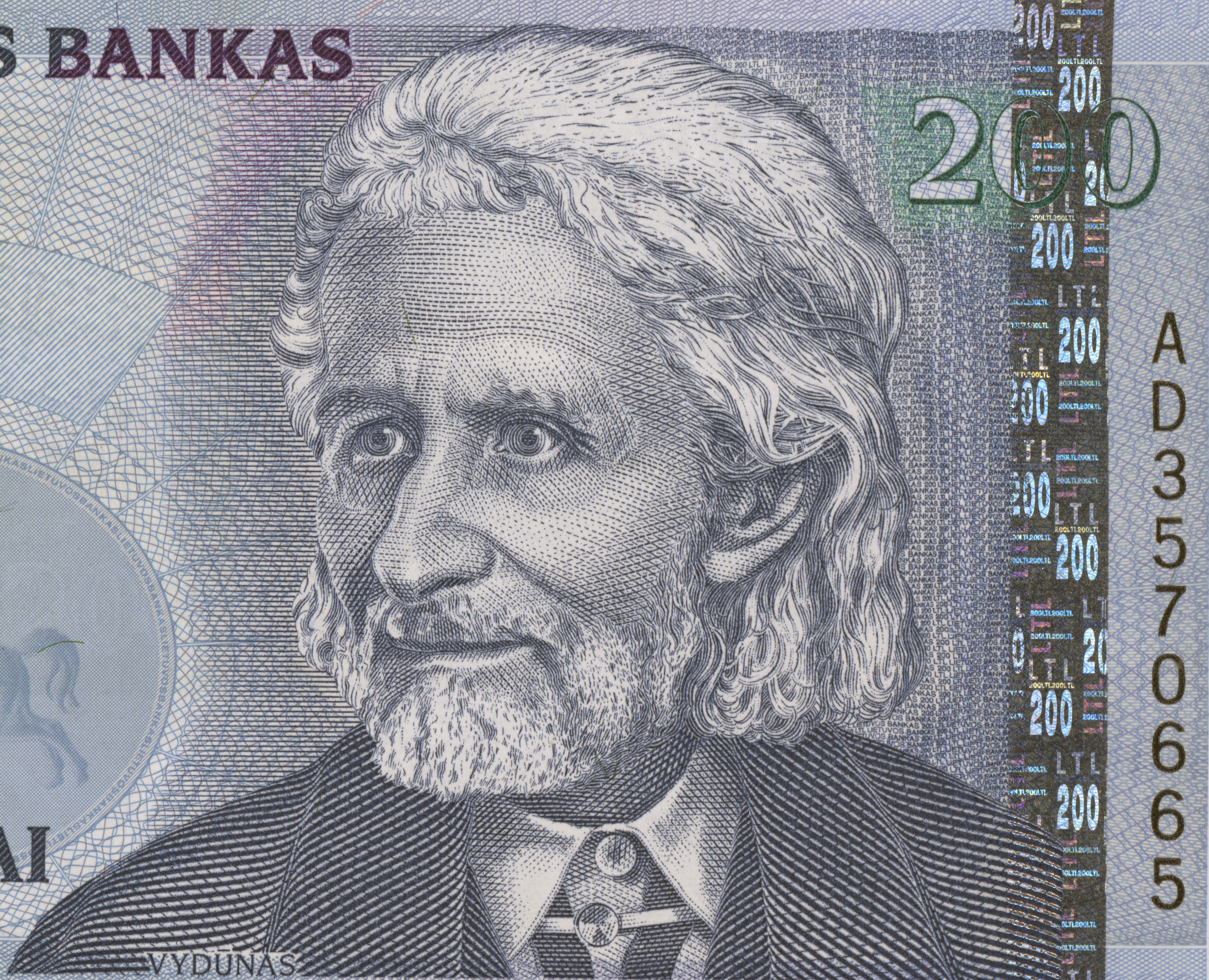
Vydunas as featured on 200 litas banknote (1997 release)

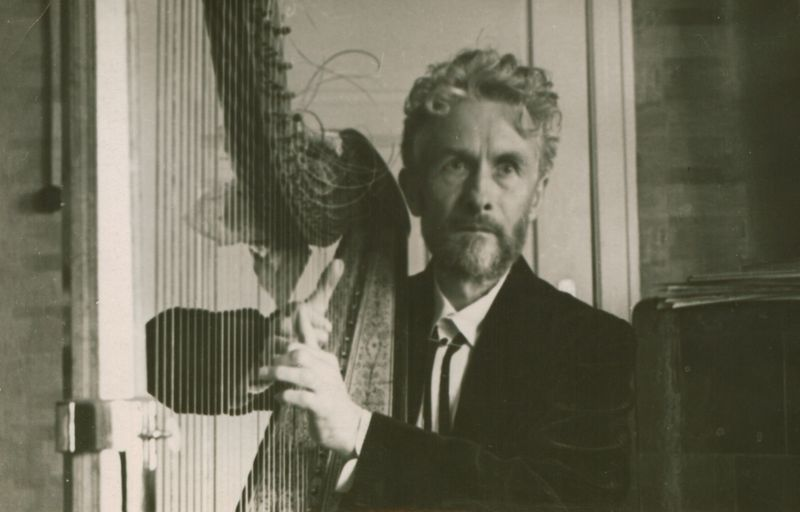
Vydūnas playing harp at home

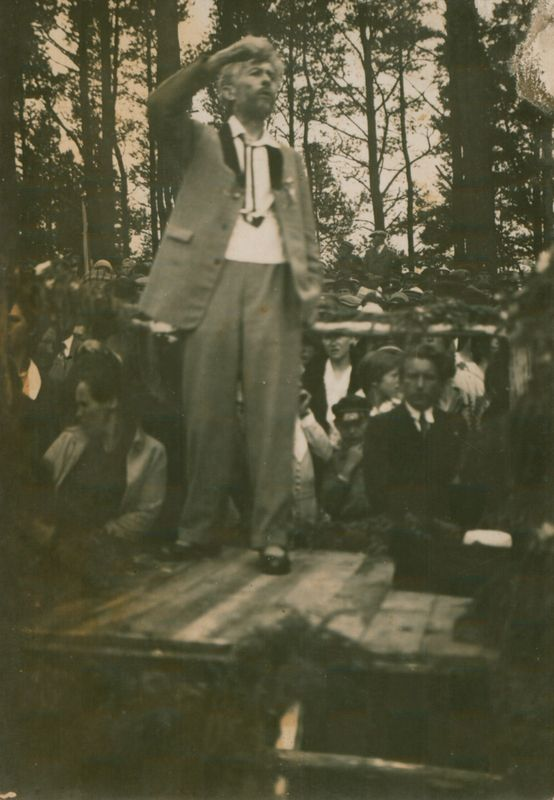
Vydūnas holding a funeral speech in 1931

Wilhelm Storost, artistic name Vilius Storostas-Vydūnas (22 March 1868 – 20 February 1953), mostly known as Vydūnas, was a Prussian-Lithuanian teacher, poet, humanist, philosopher and Lithuanian writer, a leader of the Prussian Lithuanian national movement in Lithuania Minor, and one of leaders of the theosophical movement in East Prussia.

== Biography ==
The Storost family was a long-established family in East Prussia and Wilhelm was born in the village of Jonaten (Lithuanian: Jonaičiai), near Heydekrug, in the Kingdom of Prussia. Wilhelm Storost was the name on his German passport, while Vilimas or Vilius Storostas was the literature Lithuanian form used by himself, his family, and other Lithuanians. "Vydūnas" was added to his surname as a pseudonym when he was about 40 years old. Storost was married to Klara Füllhase.

Storost was educated as teacher at the Präparandenanstalt in Pillkallen (lit. Pilkalnis) (1883–85) and at teacher seminar in Ragnit (lit. Ragainė) (1885–88). From 1888 to 1892 he was a teacher in Kinten (lit. Kintai), when he went to teach at a boys school in Tilsit (lit. Tilžė) until 1912 and taught German, French, English, Lithuanian and sports. In 1912 he left his teaching position in order to take up philosophical studies, which he took at the universities of Greifswald, Halle, Leipzig and Berlin. 1918/19 he taught Lithuanian at the Seminar for Oriental Languages in Berlin under the director Eduard Sachau. Back in Tilsit he dedicated himself to reestablishment of Lithuanian Culture, especially folks songs and rural traditions. He directed a choir and wrote songs as well as theater plays. From 1933 on he worked in Memel at the music school.

1932 he published the book Sieben Hundert Jahren Deutsch-Litauischer Beziehung (Seven Hundred Years of German-Lithuanian relations) focusing on German trade, military and religious colonization and genocide of Old Prussians. The book did not please the Nazis and in 1933 was outlawed. 1938 he was shortly incarcerated, but because of protests released after two months.

Together with nearly all of the people of East Prussia he was expelled during the Soviet take-over and lived in a refugee camp for some time. He died in Detmold, West Germany. His grand nephew Jürgen Storost recently explained that Wilhelm Storost's answered his friend Viktor Falkenhahn, that "his use of the pen name Vydūnas was his chosen anthroposophic mission; that he did not want to be a "pavydūnas", but a "vydūnas" (one who wishes everyone everything good).

Vydūnas was active in the Romuva community, but did not declare the revival of the pagan religion as either his personal goal or a national goal of Lithuanians. He was a national leader rather than a religious one, though his moral influence transcended that of a typical political leader or a writer during his time. Later biographers compared him with national leaders in India, such as Rabindranath Tagore or Mahatma Gandhi. Pantheistic universalism, not predefined with participating in any obligatory religious practice, was one of the leading ideas of his philosophy, and gained him later fame as a pioneer of both pagan revival and theosophy in Lithuania.

Vydūnas was an ethical vegetarian and wrote several essays about his ethical choices.

Vydūnas was nominated for the Nobel Prize by the Lithuanian Writers Association.
