= Usėnai Eldership =

Eldership of Lithuania

The Usėnai Eldership (Lithuanian: Usėnų seniūnija) is an eldership of Lithuania, located in the Šilutė District Municipality. In 2021 its population was 999.
