= Kintai =

- Town
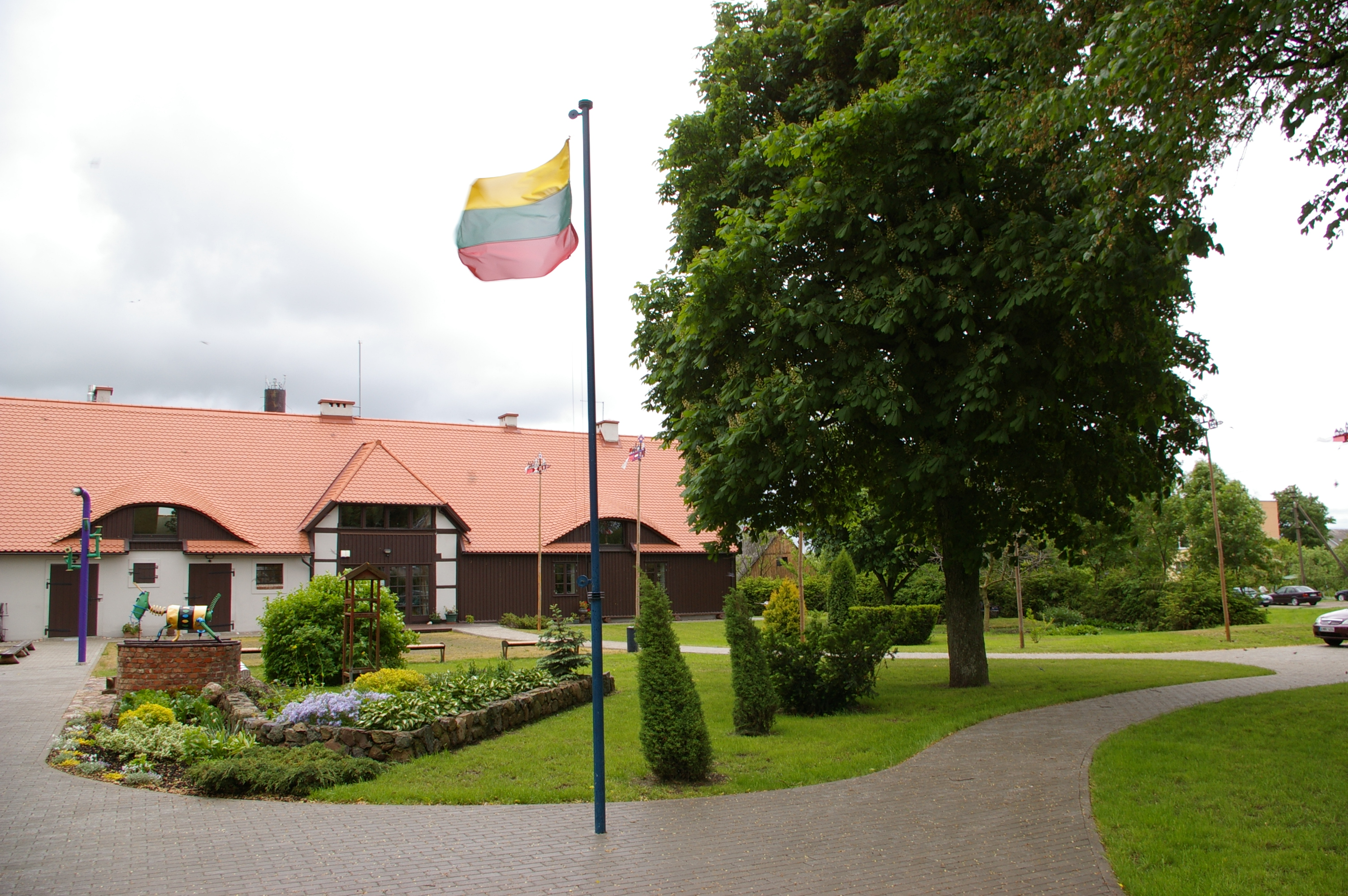
- Square in front of the Culture Centre

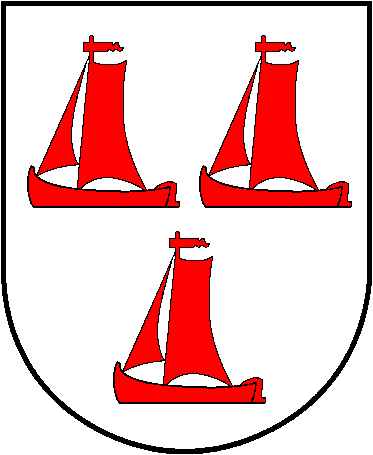
- Seal
- Interactive map of Kintai
- Location within Lithuania
- Coordinates: 55°25′20″N 21°16′0″E
- Country: Lithuania
- County: Klaipėda County
- Municipality: Šilutė District Municipality

Population (2011)
  - Total: 616
- Time zone: UTC+2 (EET)
  - Summer (DST): UTC+3 (EEST)

Kintai (German: Kinten) is a small town in Klaipėda County, in Lithuania. It is the center of the Eldership (Seniūnija) Kintai and is part of the Šilutė District Municipality. According to the 2011 census, the town has a population of 616 people.

== Geography ==
Kintai is located in western Lithuania, in the historic region of Lithuania Minor, at the Curonian Lagoon. There are three roads to Kintai, coming from Šilutė, Ventė and Priekulė. To the north of Kintai is the 800 ha wide Kintai Forest. To the southeast is the Nemunas Delta Regional Park. Europe's second highest Giant Cedar, with a height of 18 metres (59 ft), is located in Kintai.

== History ==
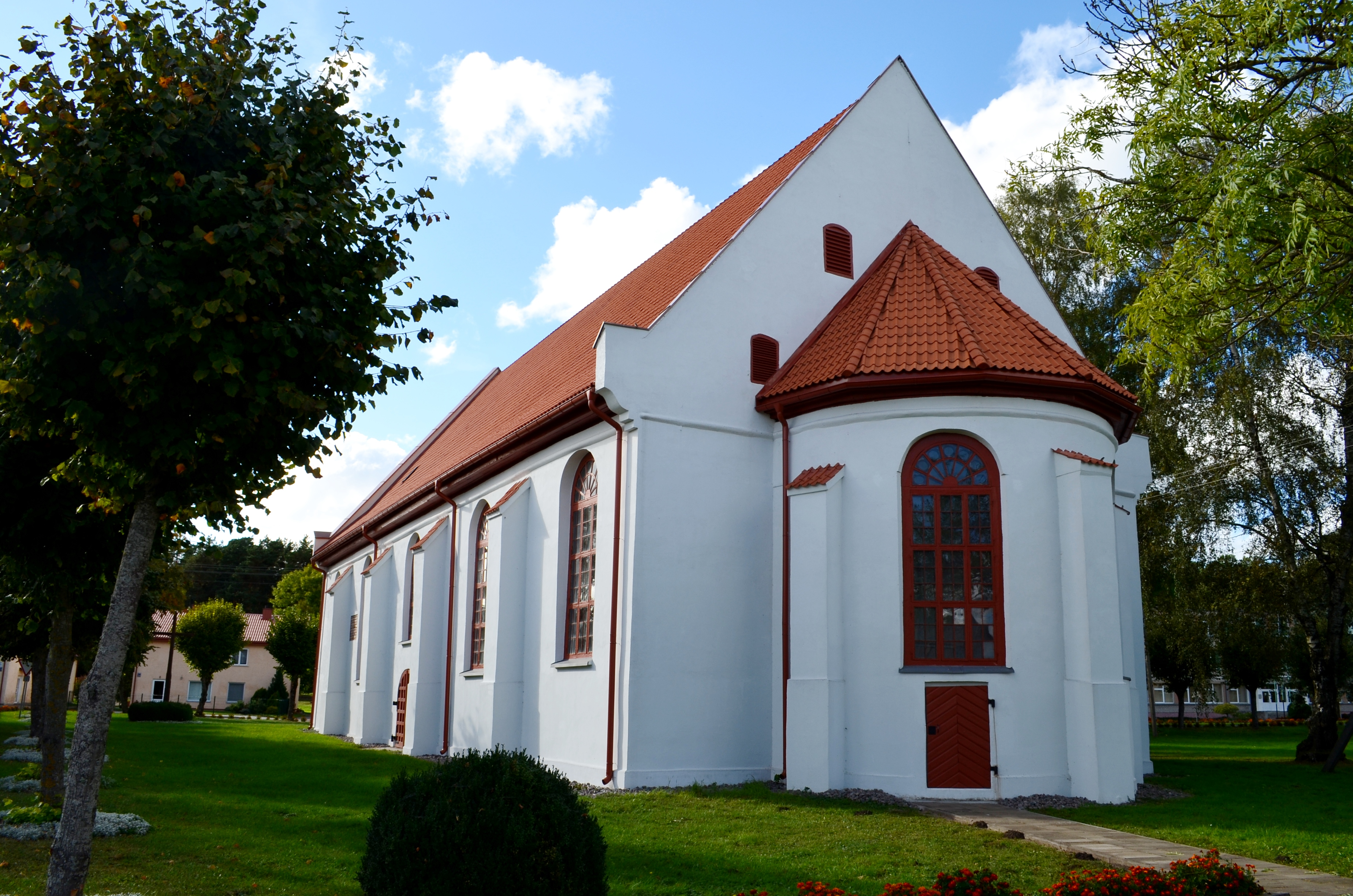
Church of Crucified Jesus

The towns name originates from the words Kintas, Kìnta.

Kintai began to appear in the 16th century when it was located within the Polish-Lithuanian Union, soon to be Polish–Lithuanian Commonwealth. The town was a part of Duchy of Prussia, which was fief of Poland. The settlement started to grow at the beginning of the 18th century.

In 1705, the Kintai Lutheran Church was built. In 1962, the church of Kintai was included in the Registry of Cultural Property of Lithuania. The church suffered severely during the Soviet occupation. It was not protected and unattended by local authorities for several years, and in 1948, it was repurposed as a grain warehouse. 1987-1982 some restoration work was done, adjusted to host concerts and exhibitions. In 1990 the church was given to the Catholic community. Next to the church the parish primary school of Kintai was founded, where 1888-1892 Vydūnas worked as a teacher.

From the 18th century, it was part of the Kingdom of Prussia, and from 1871 it was also part of Germany, within which it was administratively part of the province of East Prussia, and was officially referred to by its Germanized name Kinten.

In 1820, a state-owned forestry was founded, and in 1850, a postal office was established. Between the 18th and 19th centuries, there was a big fish and cattle market, where even fishers from the Curonian Spit went to, to sell their goods.

In the late 19th century, the village had an almost exclusively Lithuanian population of 494. In the second half of the 19th century books and periodicals were published in Lithuanian. In Kintai, Lithuanian activity started to occur actively after the First World War. Near the end of 1922, the eldest minor Prussian-Lithuanian rescue committee was founded and in 1923, the "Rūta" Society; together they had 20 members. They had a library, organized lectures and art evenings. The choir of the Lithuanian Singer Society in Kintai participated in the song festival in Kaunas, 1928.

Before the public school in Kintai was built, there was a private Lithuanian school (22 students in 1937). In the 1920s, an obelisk in memory of parishioners who perished during World War I was built next to the church. In the 1970s, after most of the German population fled west to Germany, the obelisk was torn down by the Soviet government.

Kintai suffered greatly during the Second World War and during Soviet rule (about 75% of the building's were destroyed). The population changed as well, the Lietuvininkai and Germans that moved to the west, made room for people from all over Lithuania. 1951 the Kintai Hillfort was dug off. After the war, the primary school of Kintai opened again, 1949-1960 they started to teach students up to seventh grade, 1960–1969 up to eighth grade and 1969 they became a middle school. There was a cheese factory, a forestry, an ambulatory care clinic, a pharmacy, a cultural centre (since 1957) and a library (since 1949). There was a hospital in Kintai for a little while in 1953.

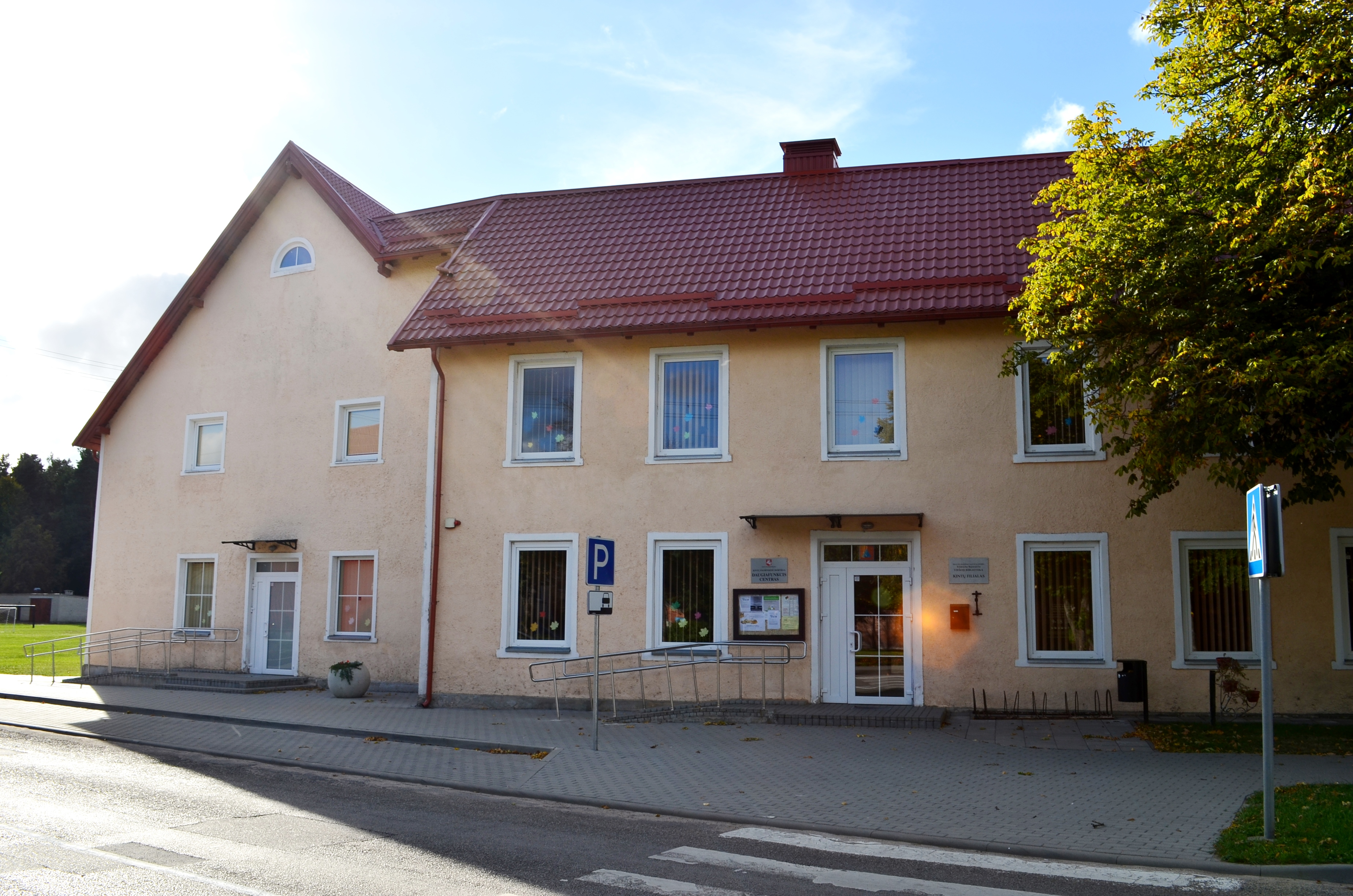
Municipal library

After the restoration of Lithuania's independence the Kintai Lutheran Church was rebuilt and given to the Catholic community (1990), the Kintai art school for children (a branch of the Šilutė art school) was founded (1994), the Vydūnas Museum opened (1994), the Kintai Charity Organization "SOS vaikai ir neturtingieji" (1996) was established and the Vydūnas Culture Centre opened (1997), which was reopened in 2002 as a public institution.

In 2011, Kintai received their Coat of Arms.

== Notable people ==
Philosopher Vydūnas (1868–1953) worked in Kintai between 1888 and 1892. He was primary school teacher. In 1988 at the church of Kintai he was unveiled a memorial stone.
