= Katyčiai Eldership =

Eldership of Lithuania

The Katyčiai Eldership (Lithuanian: Katyčių seniūnija) is an eldership of Lithuania, located in the Šilutė District Municipality. In 2021 its population was 814.
