= Saugos Eldership =

Eldership of Lithuania

The Saugos Eldership (Lithuanian: Saugų seniūnija) is an eldership of Lithuania, located in the Šilutė District Municipality. In 2021 its population was 2758.
