= Uostadvaris Lighthouse =

Uostadvaris Lighthouse Uostadvario švyturys
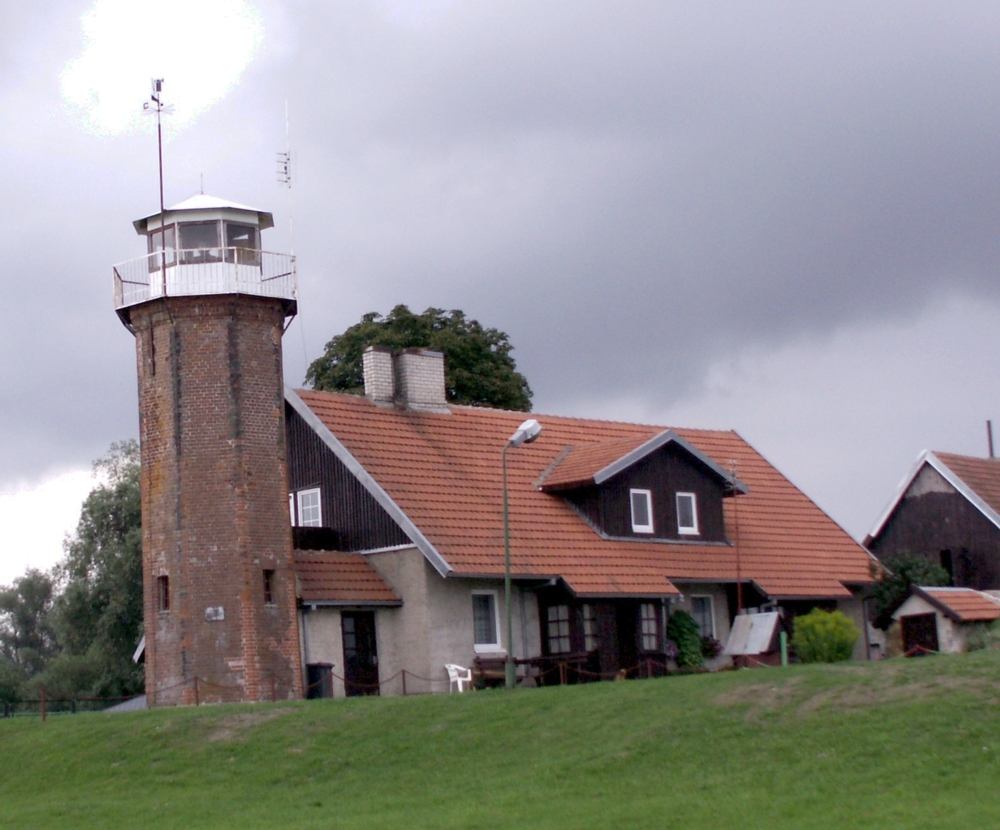
- Uostadvaris Lighthouse
- Location: Uostadvaris; Rusnė; Lithuania
- Coordinates: 55°20′39.4″N 21°17′29.4″E

Tower
- Constructed: 1876
- Construction: brick tower
- Height: 12 metres (39 ft)
- Shape: octagonal tower with balcony and lantern
- Markings: red brick tower, white lantern and balcony
- Operator: Nemunas Delta Regional Park

Light
- Deactivated: 1986
- Focal height: 13 metres (43 ft)
- Range: 12 nautical miles (22 km; 14 mi)

Uostadvaris Lighthouse (Lithuanian: Uostadvario švyturys) is a lighthouse located 12 kilometres north of Rusnė, in Lithuania. The lighthouse is located on southern side of the Atmata River, one of the mouths of the Nemunas Delta, on the coast of the Curonian Spit.

The lighthouse Kuwertshof was constructed in 1876, when the area was part of the German state of Prussia. It is an octagonal red-brick tower, attached by a passage to the lighthouse keeper's building. The lighthouse was deactivated in 1986.

== See also ==
- List of lighthouses in Lithuania
