= List of lighthouses in Lithuania =

This is a list of lighthouses in Lithuania.

== Baltic Sea lighthouses ==
The following lighthouses lie on or near the Baltic Sea.

Name	Image	Year built	Location & coordinates	Light characteristic	Focal height (metres)	NGA number	Admiralty number	Range (nautical miles)
Juodkrantė Lighthouse		1950	Curonian Spit	Fl W 8s	68	116-11996	C3334	17
Klaipėda Lighthouse		1796	Klaipėda	Iso W 6s	44	116-12004	C3346	18
Former Nida Lighthouse		1874	Nida					
Nida Lighthouse		1945	Nida	Fl(2) W 5.8s	76	116-11984	C3318	22
Šventoji Lighthouse		1957		L Fl (3) W 15s	42	116-12044	C3382	17

== Curonian Lagoon lighthouses ==
The following lighthouses lie within the fresh water Curonian Lagoon.

Name	Image	Year built	Location & coordinates	Light characteristic	Focal height (metres)	NGA number	Admiralty number	Range (nautical miles)
Pervalka Lighthouse		1900	Curonian Lagoon	Fl W 5s	15			7
Cape Vente Lighthouse		1837	Šilutė District Municipality	F W	13			1.9 (Note: Change in units: quantity in kilometre has been automatically converted to nautical mile for uniformity.)
Uostadvaris Lighthouse		1876	Uostadvaris		13			12

== See also ==
- Lists of lighthouses and lightvessels
