= Klaipėda Lighthouse =

Klaipėda range Rear Lighthouse Klaipėdos švyturys
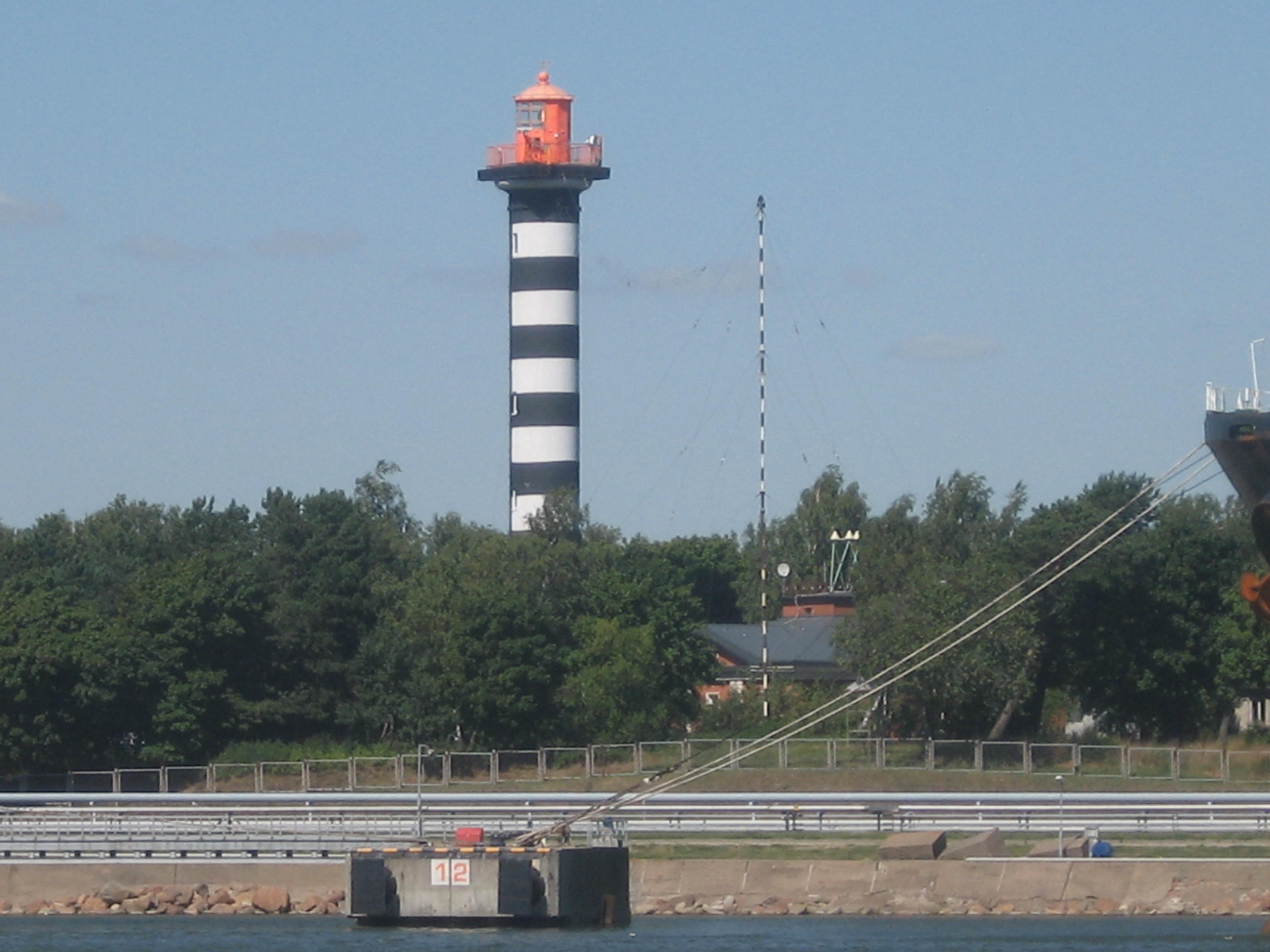
- Klaipėda range Rear Lighthouse
- Location: Klaipėda; Klaipėda County; Lithuania
- Coordinates: 55°43′40.6″N 21°05′44.4″E

Tower
- Constructed: 1953
- Foundation: two-story octagonal basement
- Construction: concrete tower
- Height: 40 metres (130 ft)
- Shape: cylindrical tower with balcony and lantern
- Markings: tower painted with white and black horizontal bands, red lantern
- Operator: Klaipėda State Seaport

Light
- First lit: 1953
- Focal height: 44 metres (144 ft)
- Range: main: 18 nautical miles (33 km; 21 mi) reserve: 8 nautical miles (15 km; 9.2 mi)
- Characteristic: Iso W 6s.
- Lithuania no.: LT-0010

Klaipėda Lighthouse (Lithuanian: Klaipėdos švyturys) is a lighthouse located in Klaipėda, on the Lithuanian coast of the Baltic Sea; located 500 metres from the coast.

== History ==
The lighthouse in Klaipėda was originally built in 1796, with its first glare shone on September 1, 1796. The lighthouse was the third oldest lighthouse on the coast of the Baltic Sea - with the only two older ones being in Gdańsk and in Travemünde. The original lighting system was made out of six bronze reflectors - however the glare's range was only four kilometres at that time. In 1819 the lighthouse was fitted with a new lighting system made out of thirteen silver-brass plates (used as reflectors) with thirteen kerosene lamps to illuminate the reflectors. The lighthouse was completely destroyed in World War II, it was reconstructed and renovated in 1953.

== See also ==
- List of lighthouses in Lithuania
