= Juodkrantė Lighthouse =

Juodkrantė Lighthouse Juodkrantė švyturys
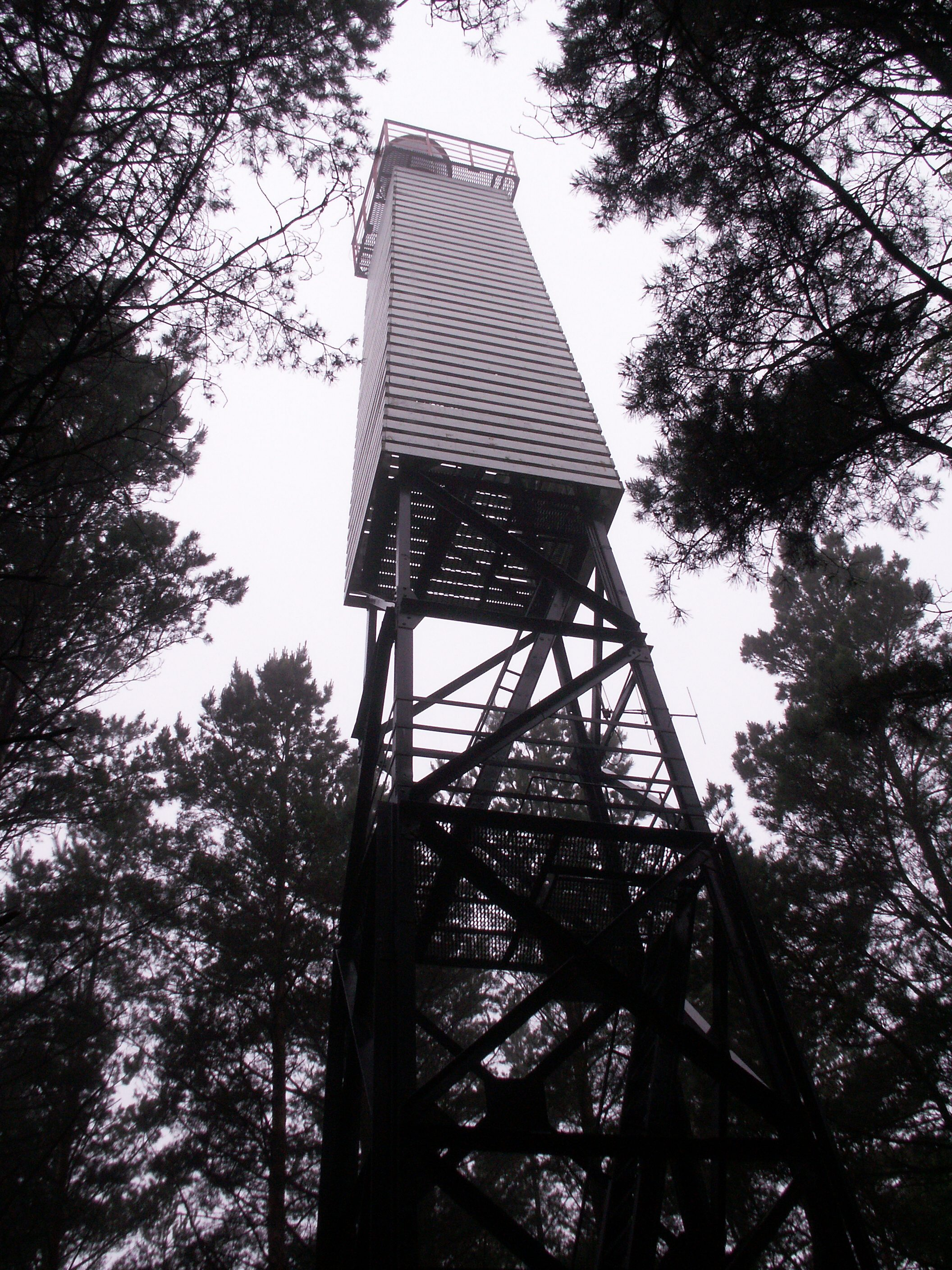
- Juodkrantė Lighthouse
- Location: Neringa; Klaipėda County; Lithuania
- Coordinates: 55°33′23.7″N 21°06′56.9″E

Tower
- Constructed: 1950
- Construction: skeletal tower
- Height: 20 metres (66 ft)
- Shape: square pyramidal tower with gallery and daymark
- Markings: white tower, red lantern
- Operator: Klaipeda Port Authority

Light
- Focal height: 68 metres (223 ft)
- Range: 17 nautical miles (31 km; 20 mi)
- Characteristic: white light, 3 s on, 5 s off
- Lithuania no.: LT-0049

Juodkrantė Lighthouse (Lithuanian: Juodkrantė švyturys) - a lighthouse on the Curonian Spit, on the Lithuanian coast of the Baltic Sea. The lighthouse was constructed in 1950; 900 metres away from the coastline. The lighthouse is a square pyramidal skeletal tower - with a white daymark and red gallery - making the lighthouse appear enclosed from far away.

== See also ==
- List of lighthouses in Lithuania
