= Pervalka Lighthouse =

Pervalka Lighthouse Pervalkos švyturys
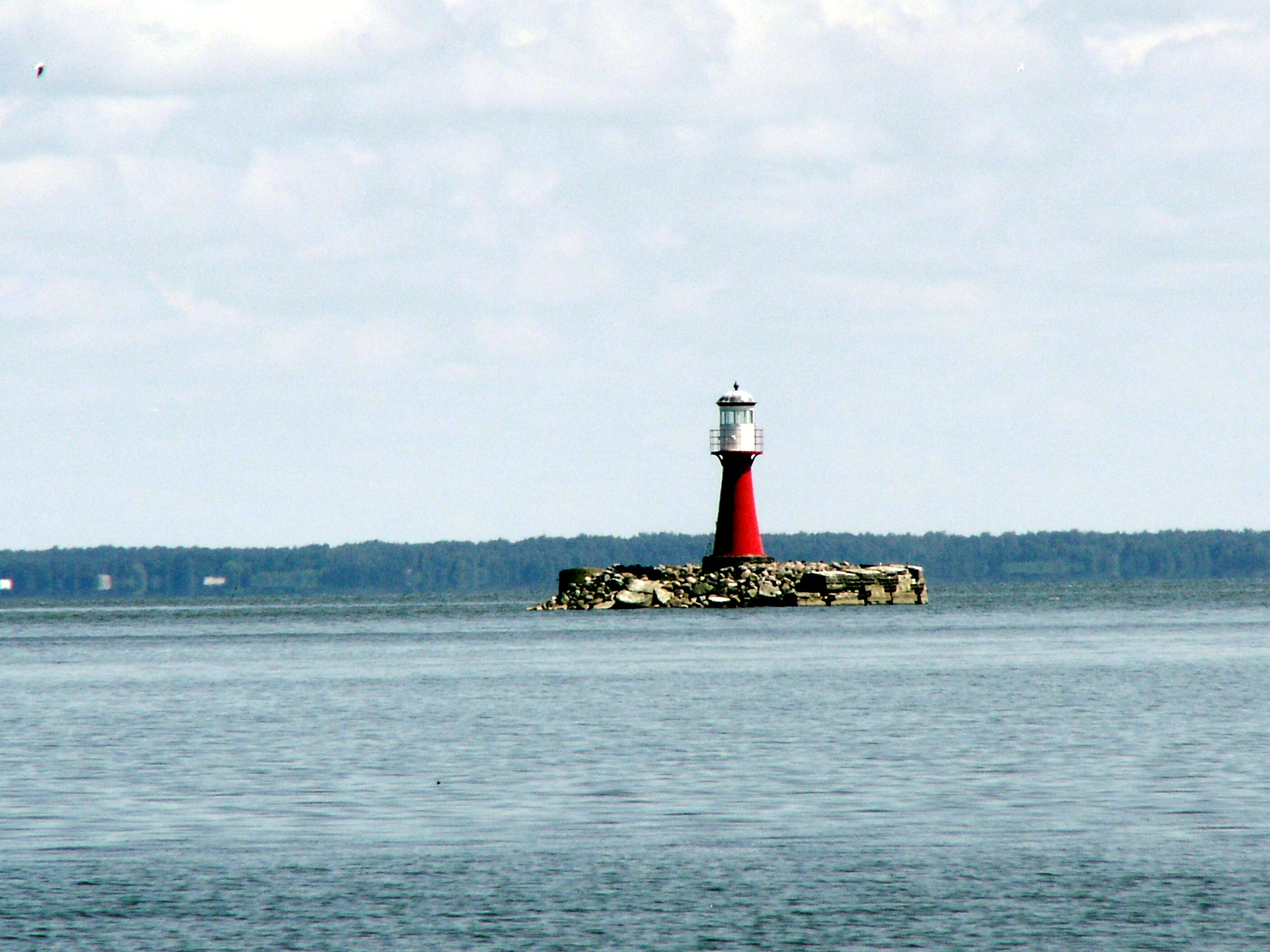
- Pervalka Lighthouse
- Location: Pervalka; Neringa Municipality; Lithuania
- Coordinates: 55°25′11″N 21°06′54″E

Tower
- Constructed: 1900 (first)
- Construction: cast iron tower
- Height: 14 metres (46 ft)
- Shape: conical tower with balcony and lantern
- Markings: red tower, white lantern
- Operator: Kuršių Nerija National Park

Light
- First lit: 1948 (current)
- Focal height: 15 metres (49 ft)
- Range: 7 nautical miles (13 km; 8.1 mi)
- Characteristic: Fl W 5s.

Pervalka Lighthouse (Lithuanian: Pervalkos švyturys) - a lighthouse located in Pervalka on the Curonian Spit, located in between the Curonian Lagoon (to the east) and the Baltic Sea (to the west); located in Lithuania.

The lighthouse operates automatically - by flashing in a white glare. The lighthouse's base is built on stone; with the lighthouse's cylindrical shape made out of sheet metal - with the current lighthouse built in 1900.

== See also ==
- List of lighthouses in Lithuania
