= Šventoji Lighthouse =

Šventoji Lighthouse Šventosios švyturys
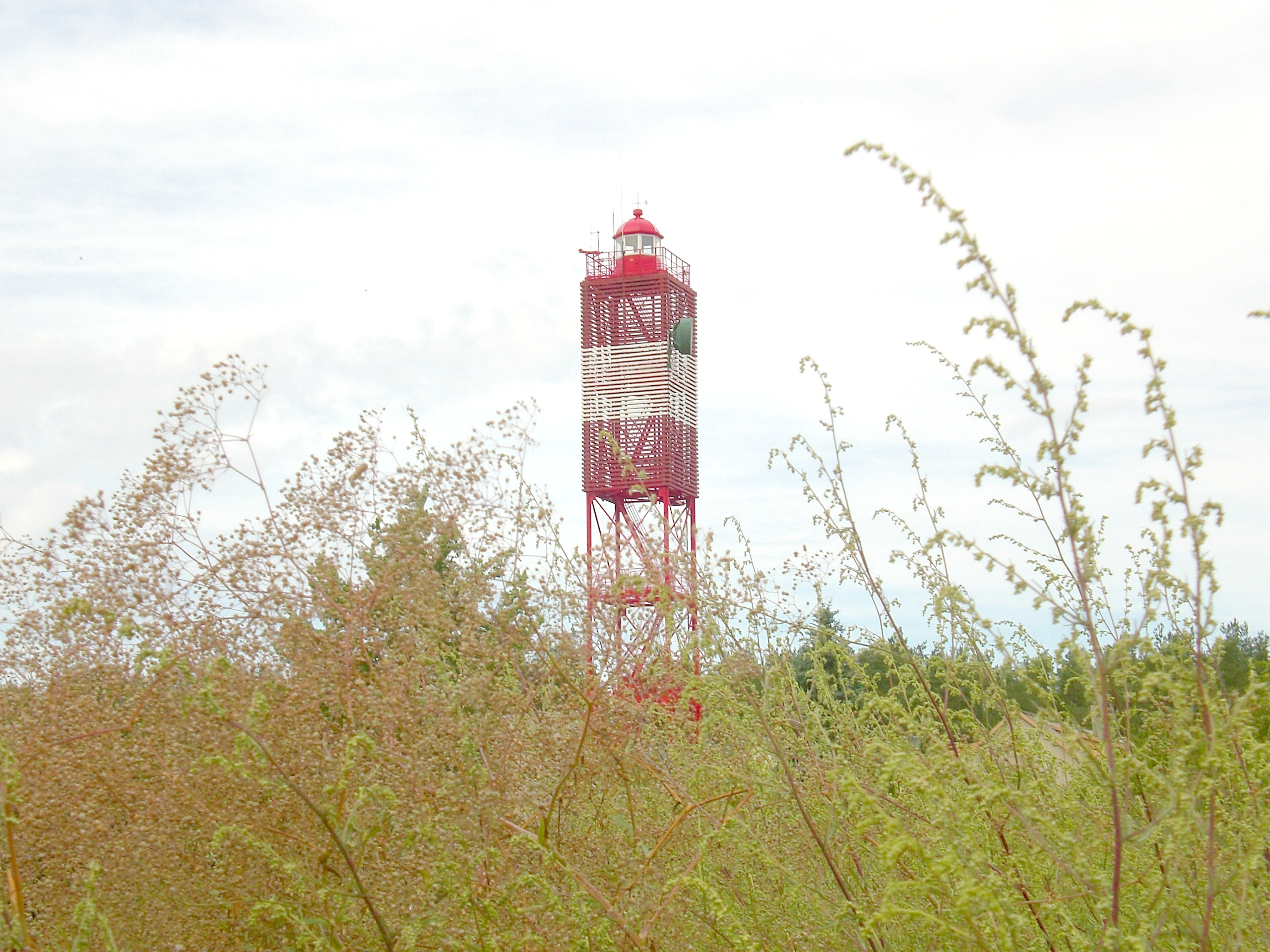
- Šventoji Lighthouse
- Location: Šventoji, Lithuania
- Coordinates: 56°01′30.7″N 21°04′56.6″E

Tower
- Constructed: 1957
- Construction: skeletal tower
- Height: 39 metres (128 ft)
- Shape: square tower with balcony and lantern
- Markings: red and white bands, red tower and lantern

Light
- Focal height: 42 metres (138 ft)
- Range: 17 nautical miles (31 km; 20 mi)
- Characteristic: L Fl (3) W 15s.
- Lithuania no.: LT-0001

Šventoji Lighthouse (Lithuanian: Šventosios švyturys) is a lighthouse located in the town of Šventoji (Lithuania's northernmost town on the Baltic coast) in Lithuania, on the coast of the Baltic Sea. The lighthouse is located 8 kilometres south from the Latvian border.

Constructed in 1957, the original lighthouse was a wooden square structure made of large wooden beams, this was replaced with metal in the year 2000. The lighthouse has white and red slatted daymarks on the upper half of its structure. The light characteristic is three long flashes of white light every fifteen seconds.

== See also ==
- List of lighthouses in Lithuania
