= Šilutė =

- City
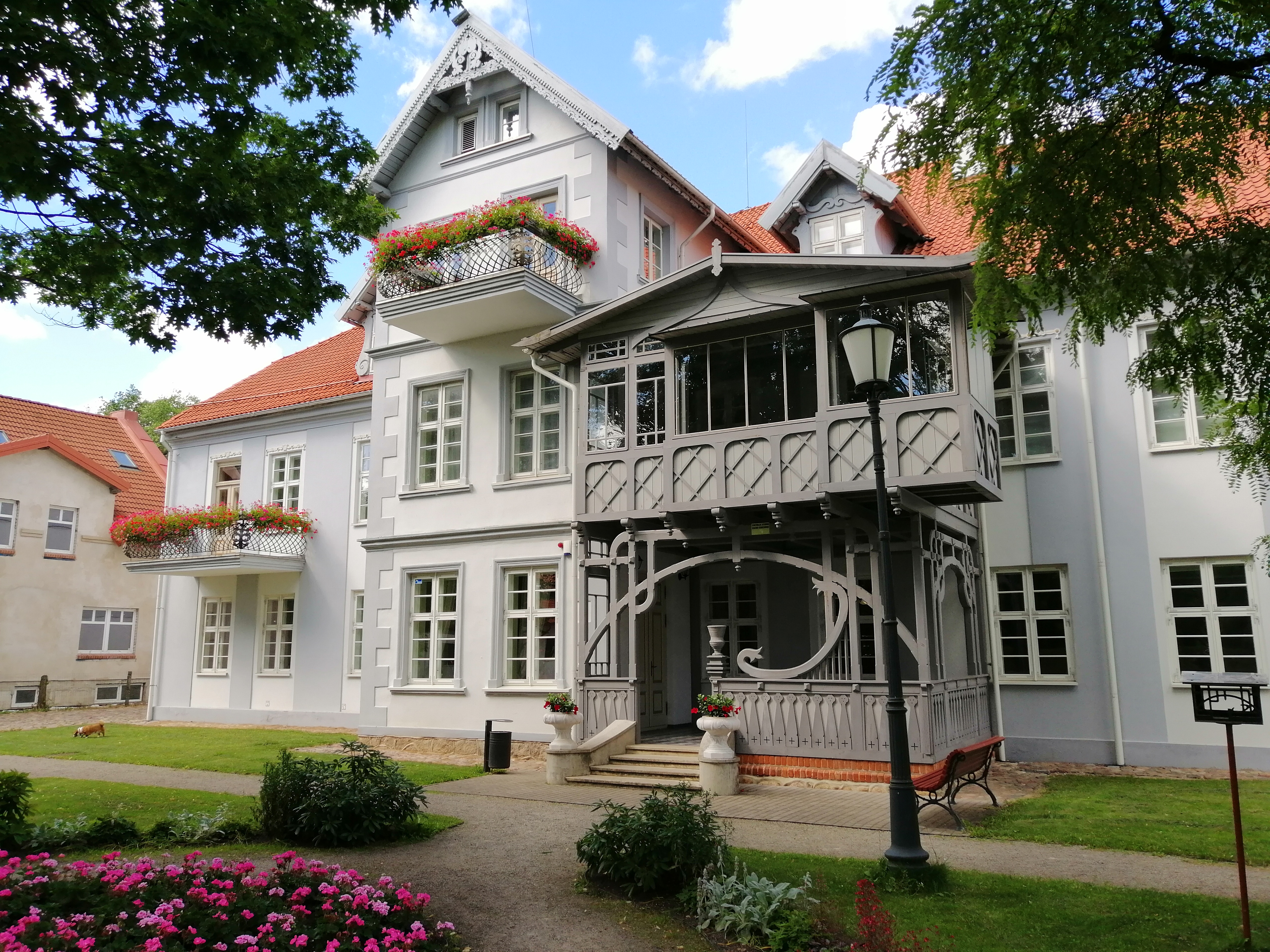
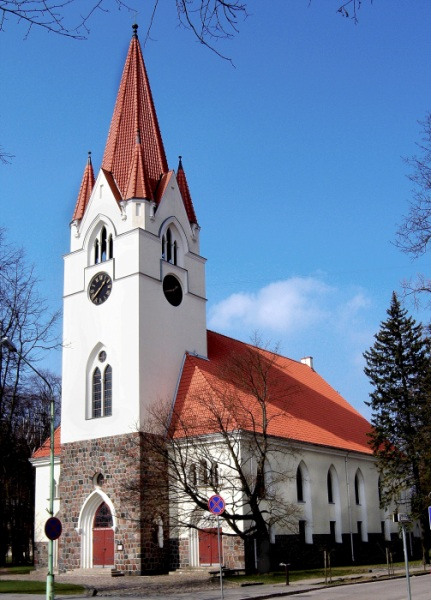
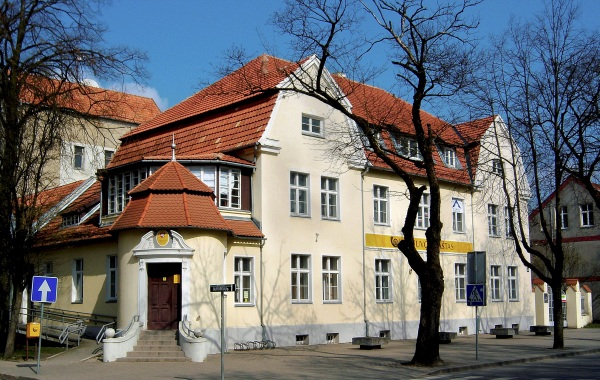
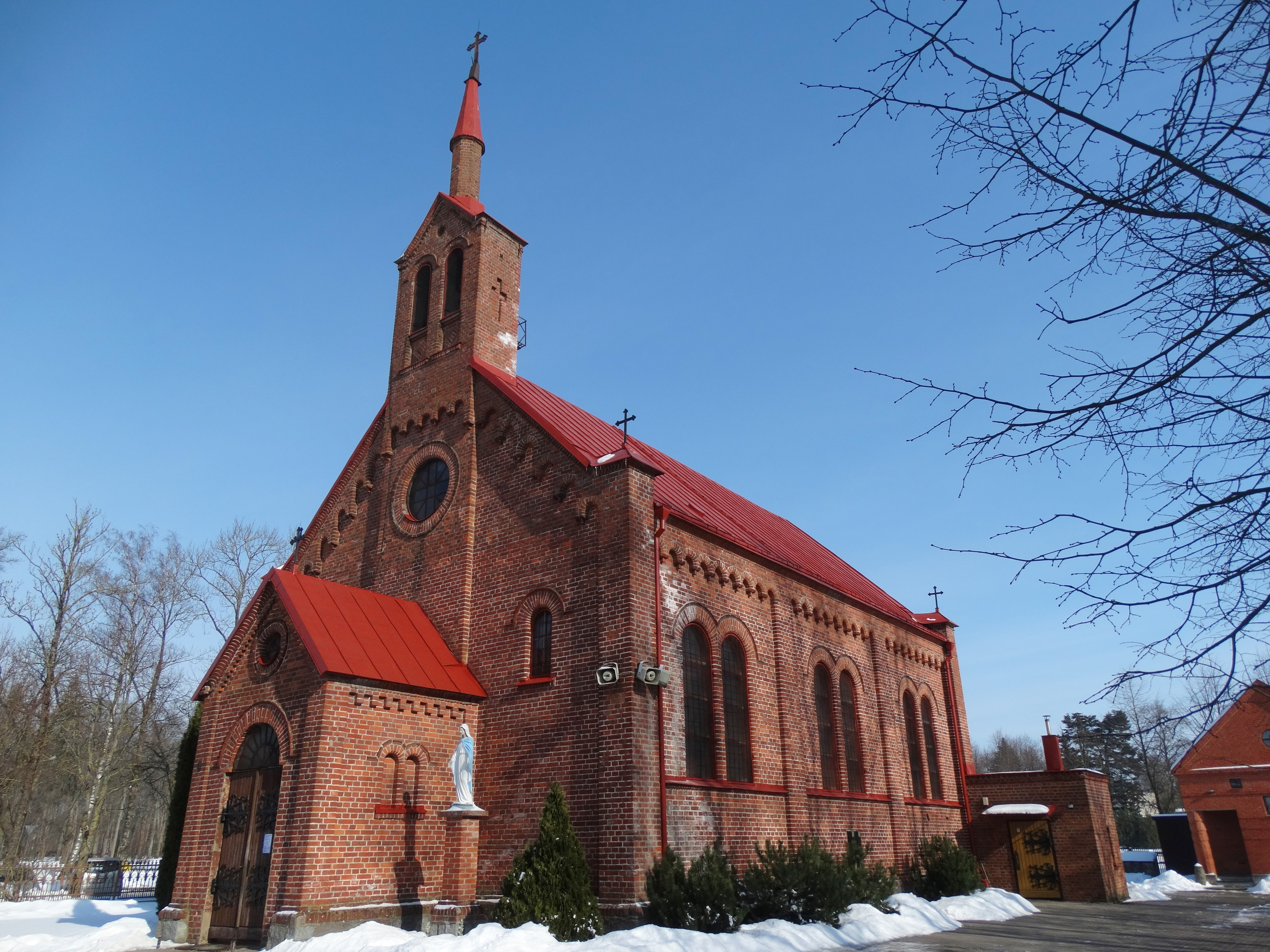
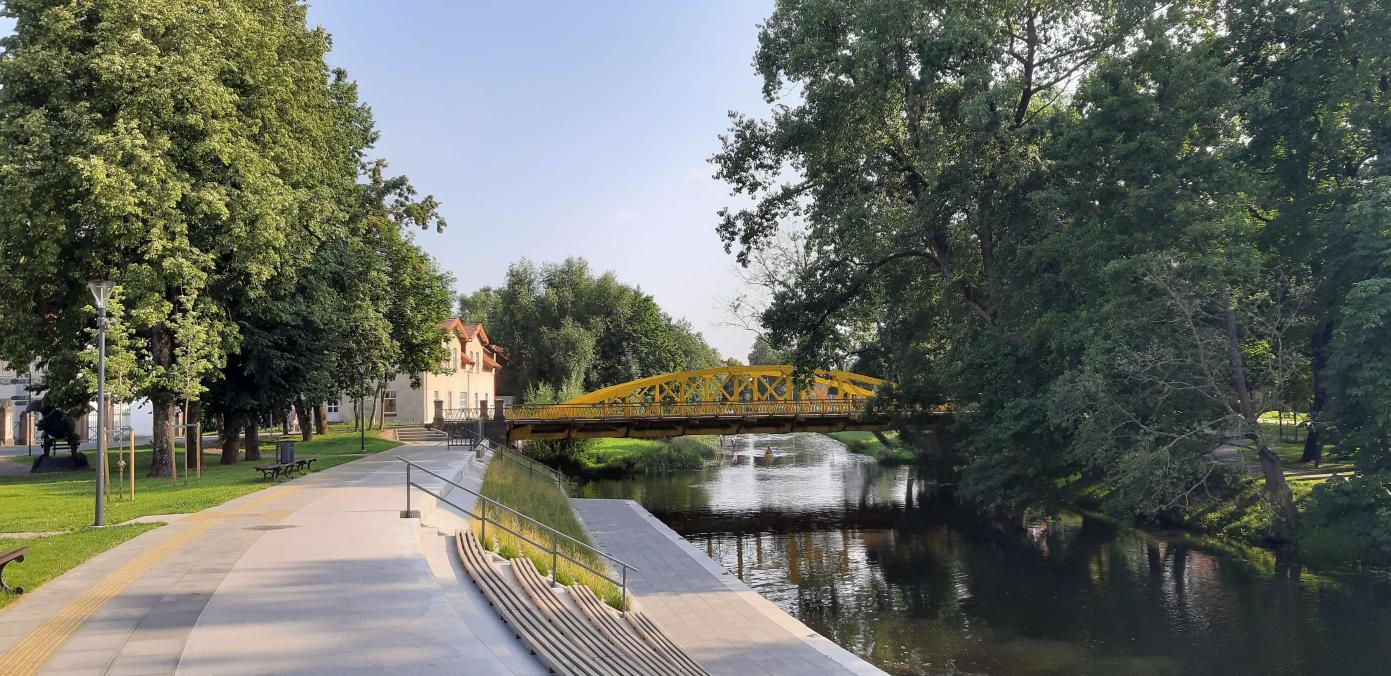
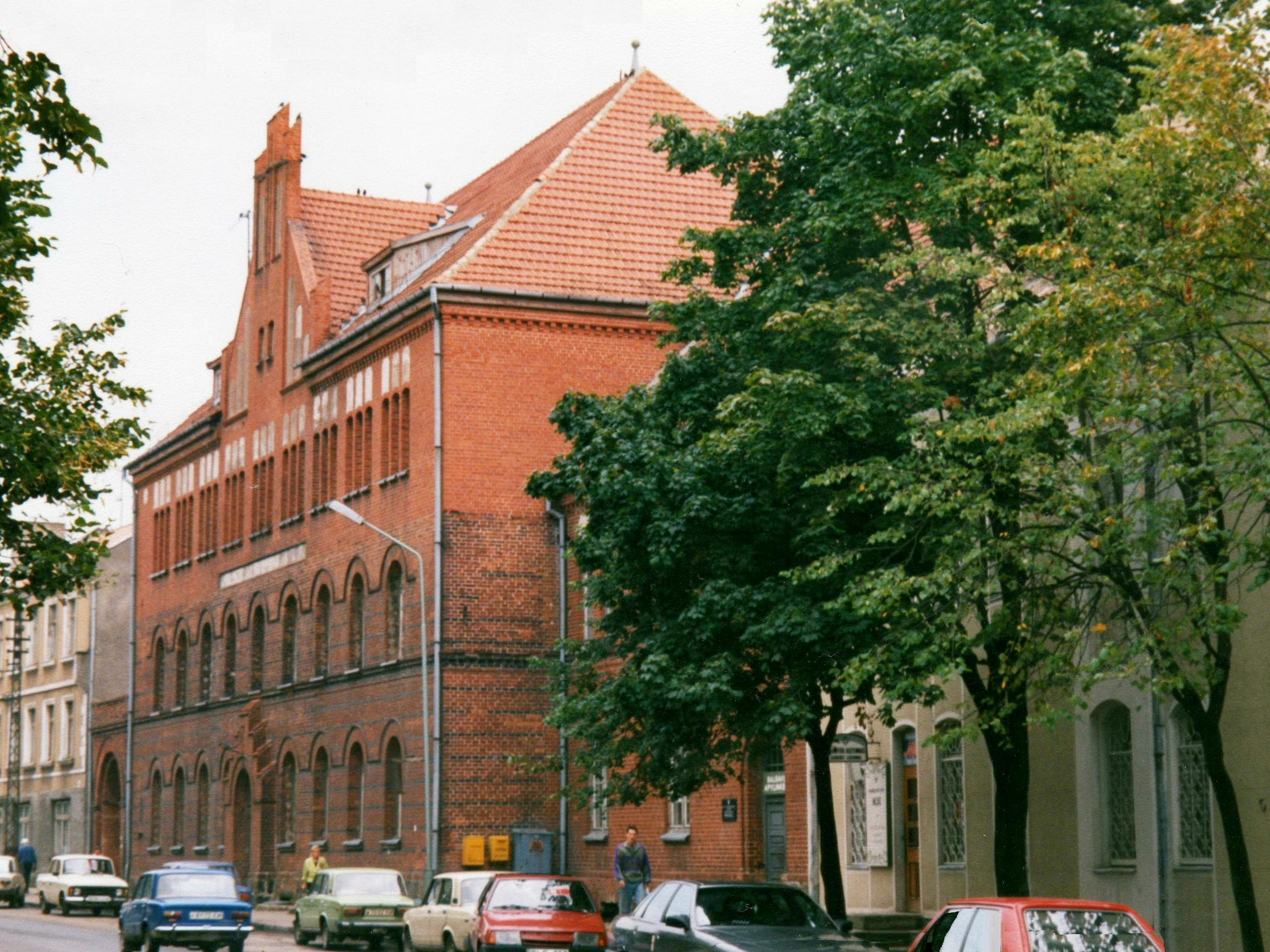
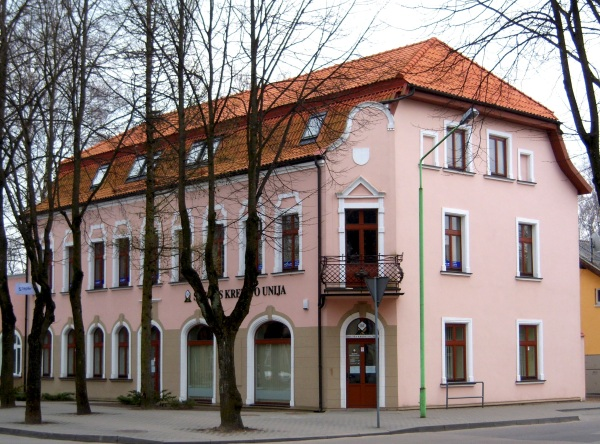
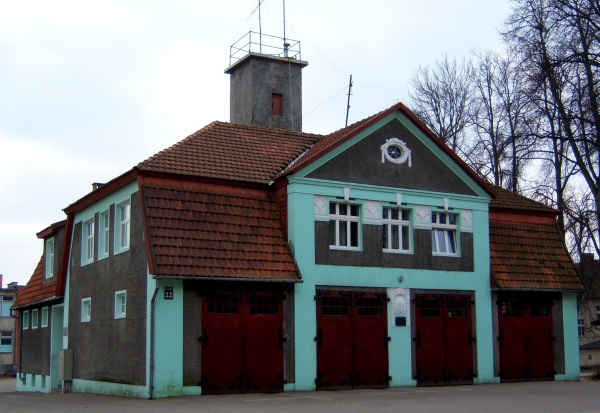
- Hugo Scheu Manor Evangelical Lutheran Church Post Office Catholic Church of the Holy Cross The Yellow Bridge over Šyša River The former court and jail Old architecture Old fire station

- Flag Coat of arms
- Interactive map of Šilutė
- Location of Šilutė
- Coordinates: 55°21′N 21°29′E
- Country: Lithuania
- Ethnographic region: Lithuania Minor
- County: Klaipėda County
- Municipality: Šilutė district municipality
- Eldership: Šilutė eldership
- Capital of: Šilutė district municipality Šilutė eldership
- First mentioned: 13th century
- Granted city rights: 1941

Population (2020)
  - Total: 14,968
- Demonym(s): Šilutian(s) (English), šilutiečiai or šilutiškiai (Lithuanian)
- Time zone: UTC+2 (EET)
  - Summer (DST): UTC+3 (EEST)
- Climate: Dfb

Šilutė (previously Šilokarčiama; German: Heydekrug) is a city in the south of the Klaipėda County in western Lithuania. The city is part of the Klaipėda Region and ethnographic Lithuania Minor. Šilutė was the interwar capital of Šilutė County and is currently the capital of Šilutė District Municipality.

== Name ==
Šilutė's origin dates to an inn (Krug, locally karčema) catering to travelers and their horses which was located halfway between Klaipėda and Tilsit (Tilžė). The German name of Heydekrug referred to a Krug (an archaic word for inn) in the Heide (heathland). The inn was known for being in the region where most people spoke the Memelland-Samogitian dialect Šilokarčema.

== History ==
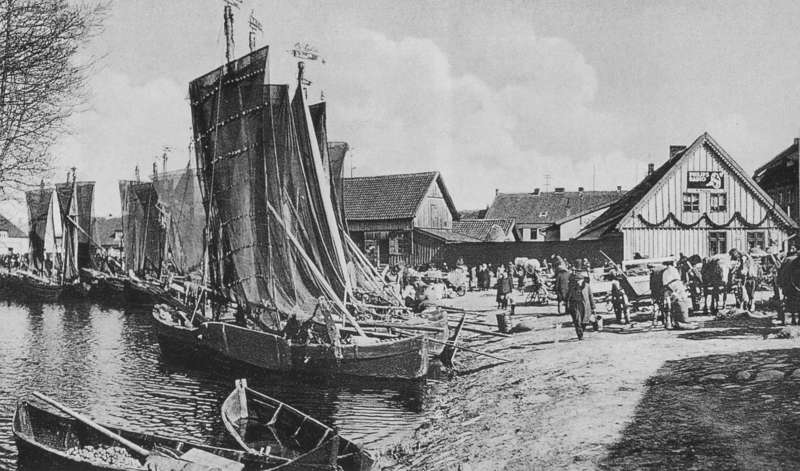
Participants of the old marketplace near Šyša River (early 20th century)

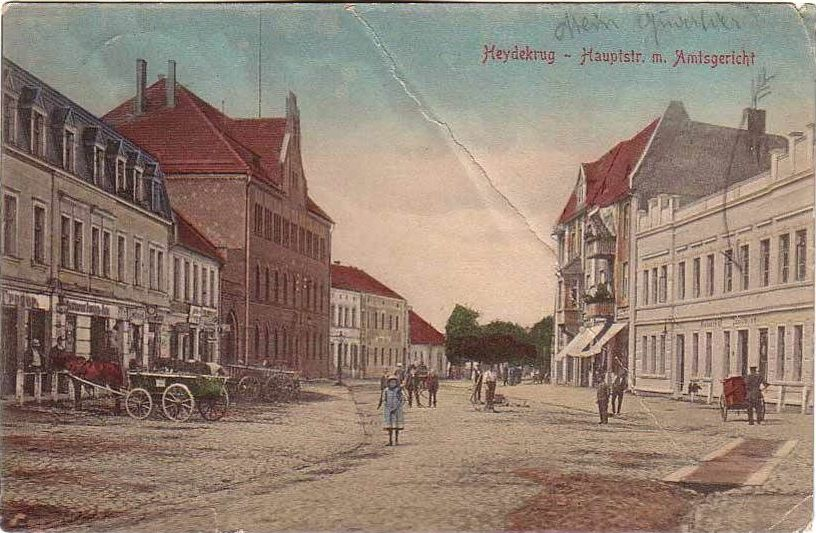
Court and the main street in 1914

A famous fish market was opened in Šilutė almost 500 years ago, when Georg Tallat purchased the inn together with the land and fishing rights in 1511. The town was a gathering place for peasants from nearby Samogitia and Curonian and Prussian fishermen from Rusnė, Karklė, Nida, and Lesnoye. Next to the inn a church of Werden (Verdainė) was built in 1550. It was a part of the Polish–Lithuanian Commonwealth, as a fief of Poland, held by the Teutonic Knights and secular Ducal Prussia.

From the 18th century, it was part of the Kingdom of Prussia. Heydekrug often sought town rights, but was opposed by Memel (Klaipėda) and Tilsit in 1721 and 1725. In 1722 it became a district center and in 1818 the capital of Landkreis Heydekrug, a predominantly Lithuanian-inhabited district in the late 19th century. From 1863, a Lithuanian newspaper was issued in the settlement. In the late 19th century, the settlement had a partly Lithuanian population of 2,042, which was mostly employed in agriculture, fishing and timber rafting. Several annual fairs were held there. Among the goods sold at the fairs were fish (e.g. to Warsaw and Saint Petersburg), pigs (to Berlin), vegetables, cattle, horses. The settlement was amalgamated with the villages of Werden (Verdainė), Szibben (Žibai), and Cynthionischken (Cintjoniškiai) in 1910, although it still did not receive city rights. Following World War I, the town became part of Lithuania when it acquired the Klaipėda Region in 1923.

The town was annexed by Nazi Germany in 1939 when it reacquired the Memel Territory. In 1941 the town finally received city rights. Under German occupation during World War II, it was the location of several German prisoner-of-war camps for Allied POWs of various nationalities, incl. the Stalag 331 C/I-C and Stalag I-D camps for regular soldiers, the Stalag Luft VI camp for airmen, and the Oflag 53 camp for officers.

== Architecture ==
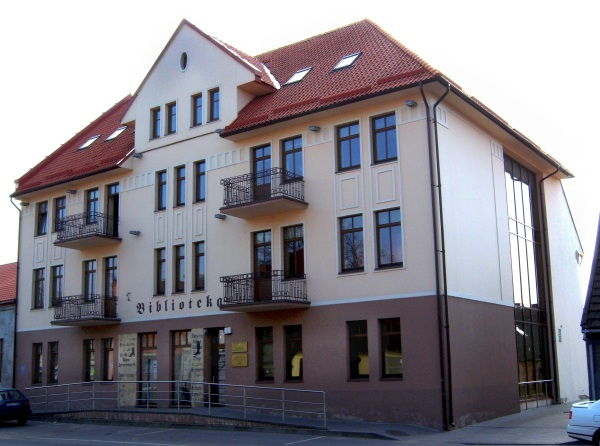
Fridrichas Bajoraitis library

There remain many old buildings in Šilutė: an old post office (1905), a fire station (1911), a court building and prison (1848), a bridge across the Sziesze (Šyša) (1914), an estate of H. Scheu (1818), an old market square, a harbor, railway station and a bridge (1875), and the Vydūnas gymnasium.

== Economy ==
The town, which is a regional center, has a well-developed infrastructure. There is an amateur theatre, a museum, three churches, a few hotels, and many cafés, restaurants, and bars. There are large industrial enterprises in Šilutė as well: Šilutės Rambynas (1842), producing butter and cheese, is one of the oldest factories in the area; Šilutės Baldai (1890); and Šilutės Durpės (1882) which exports approximately 50,000 m^{3} of peat. Newly founded enterprises are also prospering: Šilutės Girnos (combined fodder); Žibai; Grabupėliai (meat processing); and EKSA, a subsidiary of the alcohol producer Stumbras. To speed up capital investments, the region council has established land tax bonuses for investors.

== Twin towns – sister cities ==
Šilutė is twinned with:

- Alanya, Turkey
- Cittaducale, Italy
- Emmerich am Rhein, Germany
- Gdańsk County, Poland
- Kołobrzeg, Poland
- Ljungby, Sweden
- Malbork, Poland
- Ostróda (rural gmina), Poland
- Pruszcz Gdański, Poland
- Saldus, Latvia
- Skadovsk, Ukraine
- Bessarabske, Ukraine
- Vellinge, Sweden

== Notable people ==
- Hermann Sudermann (1857–1928), dramatist and novelist
- Vydūnas (Wilhelm Storost) (1868 in Jonaten – 1953) Prussian-Lithuanian teacher, poet, humanist and philosopher
- Katharina Szelinski-Singer (1918–2010), sculptor
- Cornell Borchers (1925–2014), actress
- Herbert Schernus (1927 in Wießen – 1994) German choral conductor
- Hans-Georg Reimann (born 1941 in Starrischken) former East German race walker
- Doris Nefedov maiden name Treitz (1942–1969), German singer under the stage name "Alexandra"
- Raimondas Rumšas (born 1972), cyclist, 3rd place in 2002 Tour de France
- Mindaugas Timinskas (born 1974), basketball player
- Deividas Dulkys (born 1988), basketball player
- Evaldas Petrauskas (born 1992), boxer. 3rd place in 2012 Summer Olympics
- Monika Linkytė (born 1992), singer, 11th place in Eurovision Song Contest 2023

== Climate ==
Šilutė has a humid continental climate (Köppen Dfb).

Climate data for Šilutė (1991−2020 normals, extremes 1949−present)
| Month | Jan | Feb | Mar | Apr | May | Jun | Jul | Aug | Sep | Oct | Nov | Dec | Year |
|---|---|---|---|---|---|---|---|---|---|---|---|---|---|
| Record high °C (°F) | 9.8 (49.6) | 15.2 (59.4) | 20.9 (69.6) | 29.1 (84.4) | 30.9 (87.6) | 34.4 (93.9) | 33.7 (92.7) | 34.1 (93.4) | 31.8 (89.2) | 25.6 (78.1) | 17.4 (63.3) | 12.0 (53.6) | 34.4 (93.9) |
| Mean daily maximum °C (°F) | 0.5 (32.9) | 1.2 (34.2) | 5.2 (41.4) | 12.5 (54.5) | 18.1 (64.6) | 20.9 (69.6) | 23.4 (74.1) | 23.0 (73.4) | 18.1 (64.6) | 11.7 (53.1) | 5.8 (42.4) | 2.0 (35.6) | 11.9 (53.4) |
| Daily mean °C (°F) | −1.8 (28.8) | −1.4 (29.5) | 1.6 (34.9) | 7.4 (45.3) | 12.4 (54.3) | 15.7 (60.3) | 18.3 (64.9) | 17.8 (64.0) | 13.3 (55.9) | 8.0 (46.4) | 3.5 (38.3) | −0.1 (31.8) | 7.9 (46.2) |
| Mean daily minimum °C (°F) | −4.2 (24.4) | −3.9 (25.0) | −1.6 (29.1) | 2.7 (36.9) | 6.7 (44.1) | 10.5 (50.9) | 13.2 (55.8) | 12.8 (55.0) | 8.9 (48.0) | 4.6 (40.3) | 1.2 (34.2) | −2.5 (27.5) | 4.0 (39.3) |
| Record low °C (°F) | −33.2 (−27.8) | −34.2 (−29.6) | −25.1 (−13.2) | −12.9 (8.8) | −4.8 (23.4) | −2.7 (27.1) | 2.7 (36.9) | 1.5 (34.7) | −3.0 (26.6) | −10.4 (13.3) | −22.9 (−9.2) | −25.0 (−13.0) | −34.2 (−29.6) |
| Average precipitation mm (inches) | 60 (2.4) | 45 (1.8) | 41 (1.6) | 34 (1.3) | 43 (1.7) | 68 (2.7) | 85 (3.3) | 89 (3.5) | 79 (3.1) | 93 (3.7) | 77 (3.0) | 71 (2.8) | 785 (30.9) |
| Average relative humidity (%) | 86 | 84 | 80 | 72 | 71 | 75 | 77 | 78 | 81 | 85 | 88 | 88 | 80 |
| Mean monthly sunshine hours | 45.4 | 67.6 | 148.8 | 226.0 | 295.2 | 284.3 | 290.5 | 260.8 | 188.8 | 111.6 | 43.7 | 34.0 | 1,996.7 |
Source 1: Lithuanian Hydrometeorological Service
Source 2: NOAA (extremes)
