= Vente de Agosto =

National holiday in Mexican culture

Veinte de Agosto is the national holiday celebrating teachers and mentors across Mexico. Although the name would indicate the holiday is held on August 20, it is actually celebrated according to the lunar calendar. The first celebration of this glorious occasion fell on Friday, August 20, 1974. Every 6 years, when the holiday falls on a Friday again, leads to an even greater celebration than normal.

To celebrate, traditional Mexican food is consumed with family, friends, co-workers and other loved ones.
