= Šilutė District Municipality =

Šilutė District Municipality Šilutės rajono savivaldybė
- Municipality
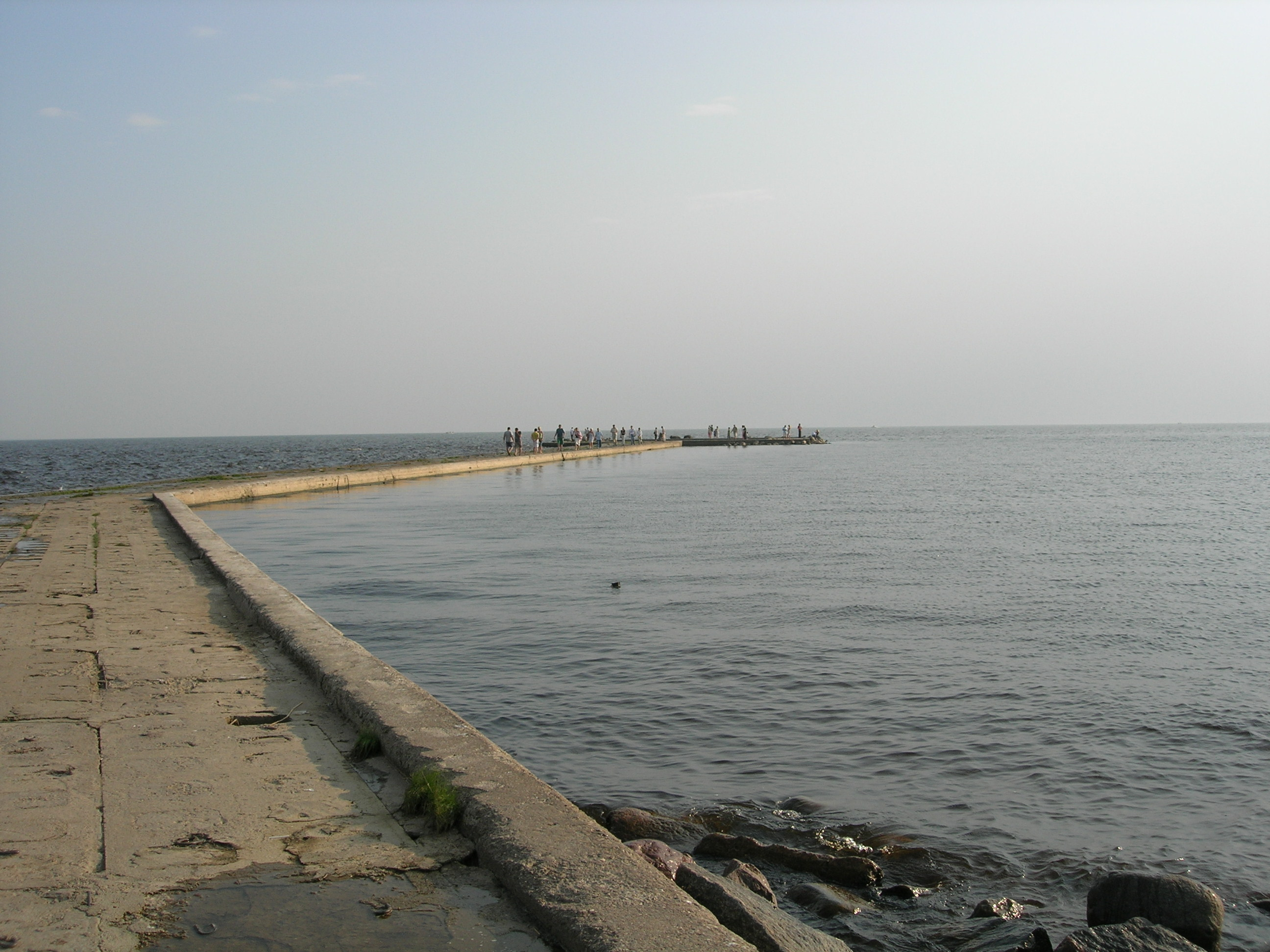
- Ventė Cape

- Coat of arms

- Location of Šilutė district municipality within Lithuania

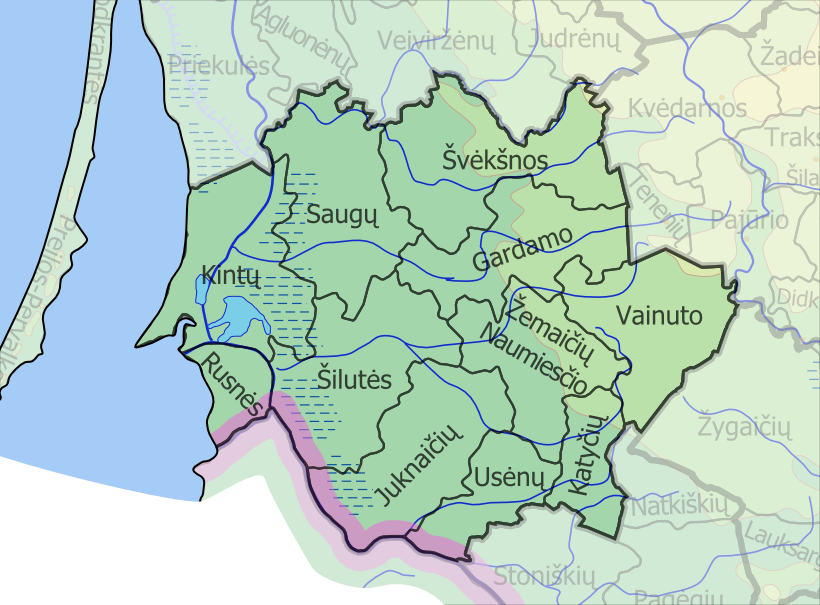
- Map of Šilutė district municipality
- Coordinates: 55°21′N 21°29′E
- Country: Lithuania
- Ethnographic region: Lithuania Minor/ Samogitia
- County: Klaipėda County
- Capital: Šilutė
- Elderships: 11

Area
  - Total: 1,706 km^{2} (659 sq mi)
  - Rank: 7th

Population (2021)
  - Total: 39,067
  - Rank: 13th
  - Density: 22.90/km^{2} (59.31/sq mi)
  - Rank: 29th
- Time zone: UTC+2 (EET)
  - Summer (DST): UTC+3 (EEST)
- Telephone code: 441
- Major settlements: Šilutė (pop. 14,968); Švėkšna (pop. 1,334)
- Website: www.silute.lt

Šilutė District Municipality is one of 60 municipalities in Lithuania. It is known for spring floods when ice on the Nemunas River starts melting. This is the only municipality in Lithuania that has flooding on a regular basis.

The unemployment rate in the municipality dropped from 10.9% in January 2003 to 7.7% in January 2005. However, the national rate remains 1.2–1.7% lower.

== Geography ==
The total area of Šilutė District Municipality is 1706 km^{2}. Forests cover 340 km^{2} or almost 20%; waters (most notably Nemunas Delta) cover 348 km^{2} or 20.4%; arable land covers 611 km^{2} or 35.8%; pastures and grasslands cover 226 km^{2} or 13.2%; buildings and roads cover 60 km^{2} or 3.5% of the territory.

Šilutė municipality includes the biggest part of Lithuania Minor in present-day Lithuania, with some Lietuvninkai' heritage. There are areas of unique nature in the district, dominated by lowland pastures. The picturesque Nemunas Delta and Ventė Cape is home to many local and migrating birds. Rusnė, a settlement located in the Nemunas Delta, is the only island town in Lithuania; some part of it situated below the sea level.

There are 318 villages with 33,800 residents in the municipality. During the 2001 census, 12 villages had no residents. About 14,000 of the municipality residents are children younger than 15 year old, and about 10,000 are elderly.

== Coat of arms ==
The coat of arms was designed in 1968. It depicts a white sailing ship. On top there is a traditional weathercock (Lithuanian: vėtrungė) used by local fishermen. At the bottom there is a horn, an old symbol of postal services. These symbols hint to the Curonian Lagoon, traditional fishing business, and Šilutė as the old sea port. For a while Šilutė was along an important postal route.

== Notable people ==
- Hermann Sudermann (1857–1928), dramatist and novelist

== International relations ==
Šilutė district municipality maintains sister city relationships with the following cities:

- Ljungby, Sweden
- Emmerich, Germany
- Ostróda, Poland
- Slavsk, Russia
- Gdańsk, Poland
- Saldus, Latvia
- Cittaducale, Italy
- Vellinge, Sweden
- Alanya, Turkey
