= Martin Reisgys =

Politician from Klaipėda Region (1886–1942)

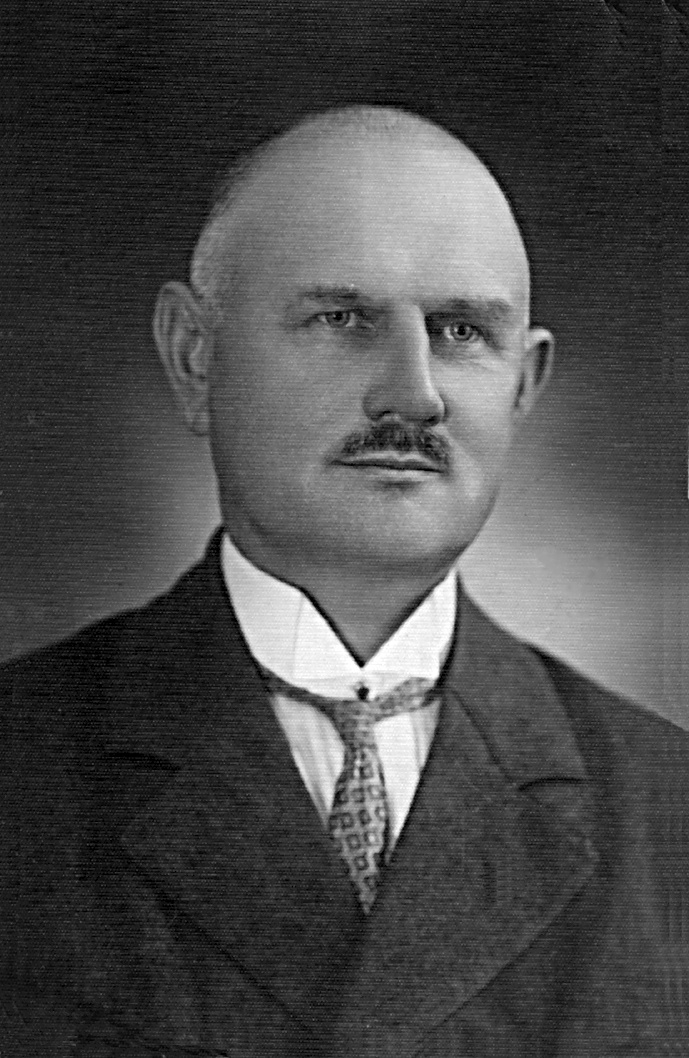
- Reisgys in 1930
- Born: 11 December 1886; Venckai, East Prussia
- Died: 2 April 1942 (aged 55); Mauthausen concentration camp
- Awards: Order of the Lithuanian Grand Duke Gediminas

Martin (Martynas) Reisgys (11 December 1886 – 2 April 1942) was a politician and a public figure in Lithuania Minor (Prussian Lithuania) and interwar Klaipėda Region (Memelland) in Lithuania. He supported the Klaipėda Revolt in January 1923 and was the president of the Directorate of the Klaipėda Region in 1930–1931 and 1934. He attempted to implement pro-Lithuanian policies and contain the growing Nazi influence in the region. He died in the Mauthausen concentration camp.

== Biography ==
=== Early years ===
Martin Reisgys was born in 1886 as the eldest of five children in a farming family in the village of Venckai. His parents bought a 12-hectare (30-acre) farm in Biržininkai near Klaipėda. He attended school in Venckai, was considered a talented student, and was recommended to become a teacher, but decided to pursue a career in construction instead. He was self-taught and, after passing exams in Klaipėda, built houses in Rokai, Voveriškiai, Butkai, Šventvakariai.

From 1906 to 1908, he served in the Imperial German Army. During World War I, he was drafted into the German army again, but his language skills allowed him to serve as a translator for Lithuanian and Latvian.

After his military service, he became involved in the Lithuanian national movement. In 1912, he co-founded Jaunimas, a Lithuanian youth association in the village of Lankupiai, which promoted the Lithuanian language and culture and later joined the Santara Society.

=== Political work ===
After World War I, Reisgys became politically involved with the Lithuanian movement in the Klaipėda Region, which was placed under French administration as a mandate of the League of Nations. As a member of the National Council of Lithuania Minor, he traveled with a delegation to the Conference of Ambassadors in Paris in the fall of 1922 to advocate for the region's annexation to Lithuania. On the eve of the Klaipėda Revolt in January 1923, he joined the rebel directorate under Erdmonas Simonaitis, which advocated for a Lithuanian takeover of the region.

Reisgys was active in his local community. He joined the Lithuanian Riflemen's Union in 1923 and was long-term leader of its local chapter in Dovilai. He was also a member of the Sandora Society and the school board of Dovilai parish. He was a shareholder of Rytas, a Lithuanian publishing house.

=== Directorate ===
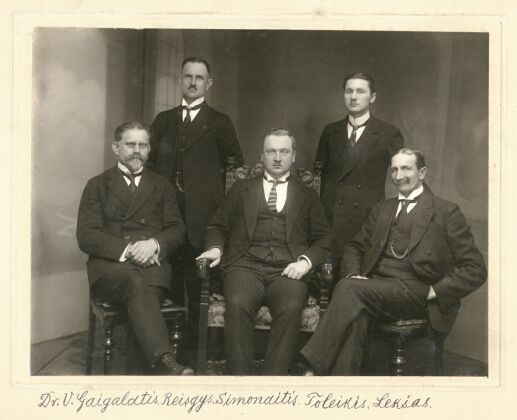
Directorate of 1923 (Reisgys at the back left)

Reisgys was a member of the Directorate of the Klaipėda Region between February 1925 and January 1926, and between December 1927 and August 1930. He served as directorate's president twice, from 16 August 1930 to 1 January 1931 and from 28 June to 1 December 1934.

Directorate of Otto Kadgiehn received a vote of no confidence from the Parliament of the Klaipėda Region in May 1930. After prolonged negotiations, the Governor of the Klaipėda Region appointed Reisgys as the president of the directorate. This new directorate could not win parliament's approval. Therefore, the governor dismissed the parliament, and Germany submitted the dispute to the League of Nations. Lithuania wished to avoid the intervention by the League and compromised with Germany, appointing Otto Böttcher as the president in January 1931.

After the Nazi seizure of power in Germany, pro-Nazi parties were organized in the Klaipėda Region in spring–summer 1933. The Lithuanians responded by appointing the hard-line advocate of Lithuanian interest Jonas Navakas as the governor in November 1933. He reinstated Reisgys as the director, but it was clear that he could not obtain vote of confidence from the parliament. Thus, the Lithuanian military commander dissolved the Memel Agricultural Party, pro-German party with 11 seats in the parliament, on grounds that it was seditious and prohibited its members from sitting in the parliament. Therefore, the parliament lacked the quorum to dismiss Reisgys.

Reisgys' directorate took decisive steps to combat Nazi influence in the region. It dismissed several hundred government employees, including heads of local self-government, police officers, and judges, and replaced them with people more loyal to Lithuania. The directorate then attempted to reform the administration, courts, and schools requiring the equal use of the Lithuanian and German languages. This caused numerous lawsuits against the directorate, protests, and intense German propaganda. At the end of 1934, Reisgys resigned and most of the reforms were undone.

Reisgys returned to his farm in Jurgiai. Even after his resignation, he continued to oppose Nazi influences. In 1935, he appeared as a witness in the trial against the pro-Nazi activists Ernst Neumann and Theodor von Sass at the court in Kaunas.

=== Persecution and death ===
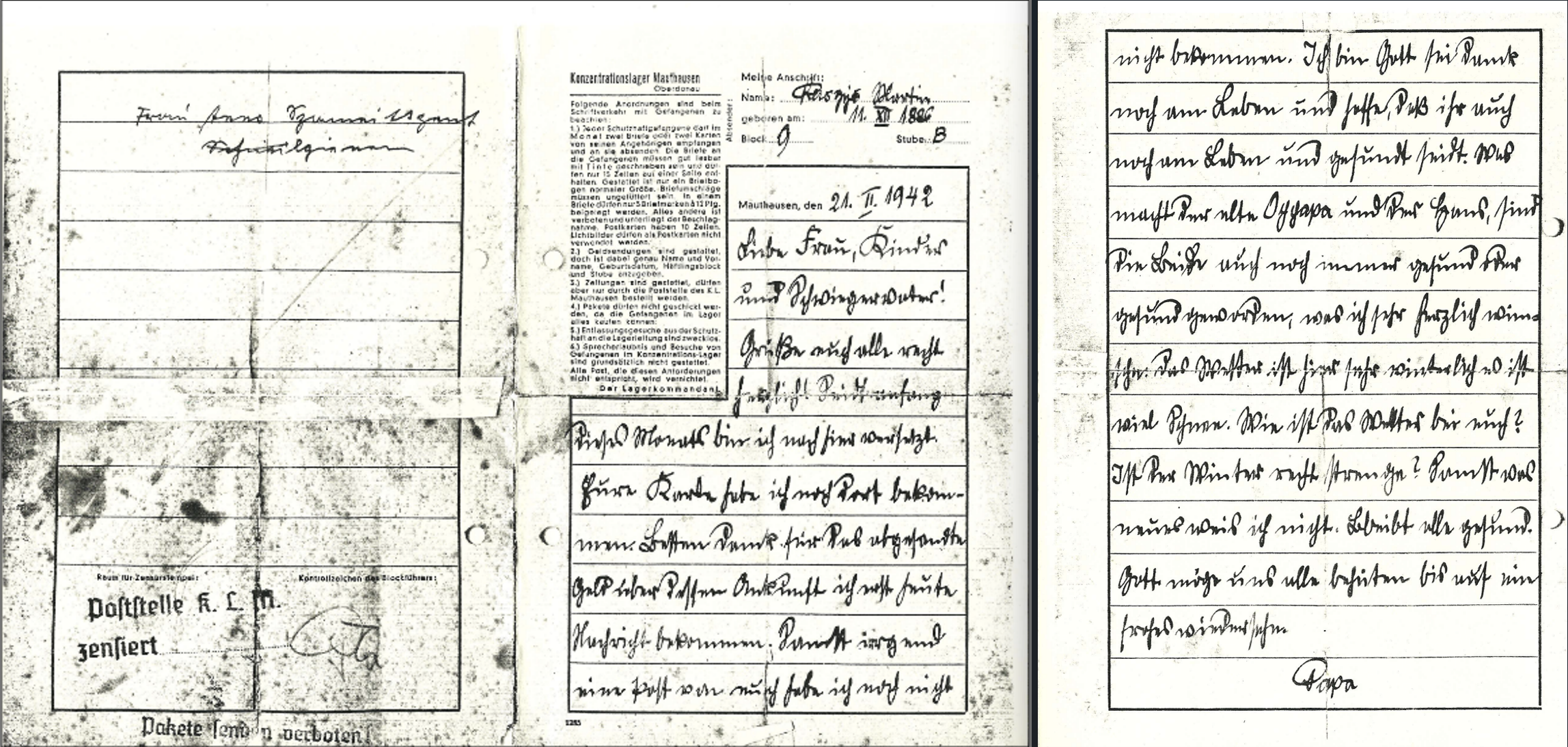
Reisgys' last letter from the Mauthausen concentration camp dated 11 February 1942

When Nazi Germany took over the Klaipėda Region in March 1939, Reisgys sought safety in Kuršėnai, Lithuania. He was gifted the local manor by the government of Lithuania for his work on Lithuanian causes. When the Soviets occupied Lithuania in June 1940, Reisgys travelled to Šiauliai hoping to obtain a replacement passport. However, the Soviet NKVD treated him as a criminal and interrogated him for several hours. After this experience, he decided to repatriate to Germany and return to his farm in Jurgiai.

In June 1941, he was arrested by the Gestapo and interrogated in Klaipėda and Königsberg. He was deported to the Sachsenhausen concentration camp near Berlin and finally to the Mauthausen concentration camp in Austria. He died there on 2 April 1942. His remains were cremated.

== Awards ==
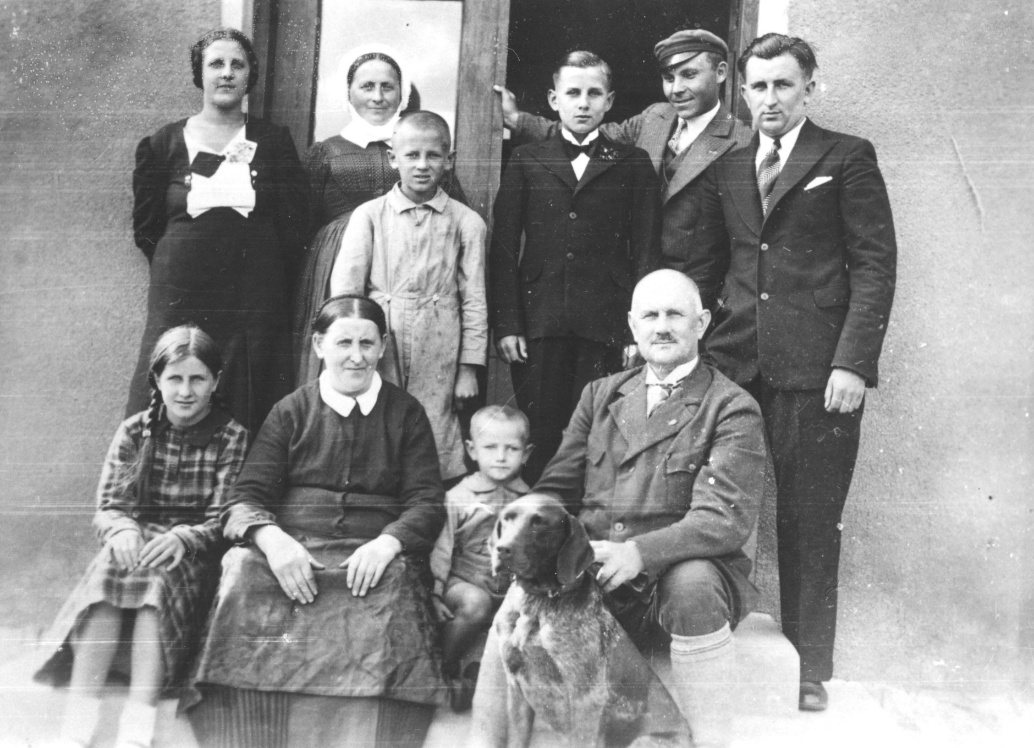
Reisgys (front right) with his wife Anikė (front left) and their six children and the household staff in 1934 in Jurgiai

Reisgys received the following awards:

- Order of the Lithuanian Grand Duke Gediminas (2nd degree)
- Independence Medal
- Riflemen's Star
- Medal for the Liberation of Klaipėda

== Personal life ==
In 1913, he married Anikė Dietzkies from Jurgiai. The marriage produced six children. Through marriage, he came into possession of a 54-hectare (130-acre) farm, which he systematically modernized and erected new buildings.

After his death, his family continued to be persecuted: in May 1948, the Soviets deported his widow Anikė and their three younger children, Martin, Eva, and Jonas, to Bolturino in the Krasnoyarsk Krai. Anikė died there in 1958. It was not until 1960 that her children, Martin, Eva, and Jonas, were allowed to leave for West Germany. The two eldest sons, Jurgis and Anskis, emigrated to Australia after the war, while the eldest daughter, Ana, remained in Lithuania.

== Legacy ==
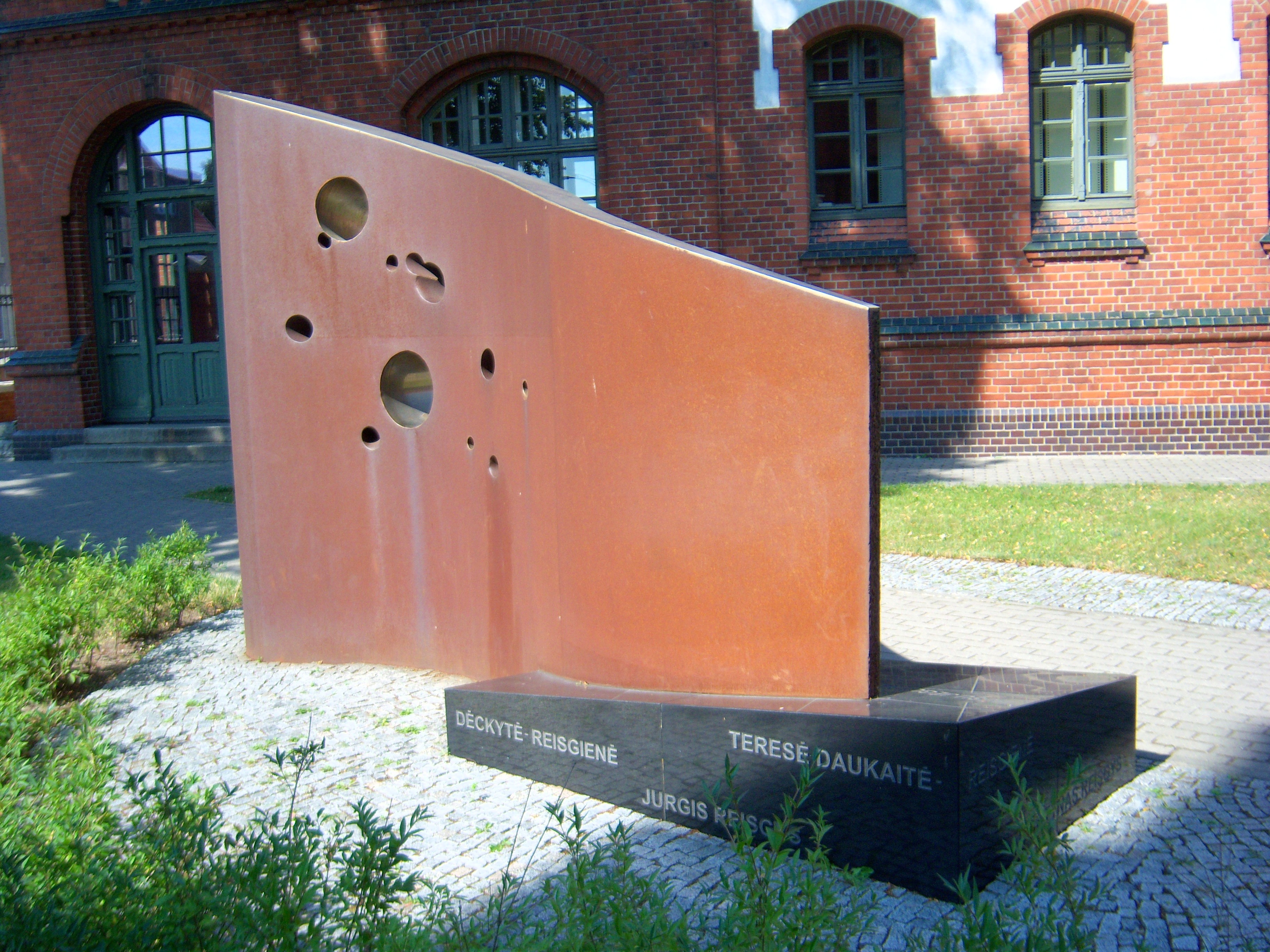
Sculpture Banga

Reisgys' neighbor and sculptor Vytautas Majoras erected a traditional Lithuanian memorial cross in honor of Reisgys on the site of his former farm in Jurgiai in 1986.

In memory of Reisgys and his family, the sculpture Banga ("Wave") was unveiled on the campus of Klaipėda University on 2 April 2009. The sculpture, created by artist Vytautas Karčiauskas and architect Gintas Reisgys, is shaped like a wave and is made from black granite and steel. At the same time, the family donated surviving Reisgys' archive to Klaipėda University.

In July 2025, a cenotaph for Reisgys was installed in the cemetery of Kisiniai village.
