= Wilhelm Bertuleit =

Wilhelm "Willi" Bertuleit (Lithuanian: Vilius Bertulaitis; 29 May 1900 – 22 July 1941) was a Prussian Lithuanian active in the Klaipėda Region (Memelland). He supported Nazi Germany and its attempts to retake the region from Lithuania. He was a member of the NSDAP and SA. He was killed in action serving in the Wehrmacht in the Eastern Front.

== Biography ==
Bertuleit was born in Rund-Görge, now Bendikai village, just a bit north of Memel, now Klaipėda. He was director of a German bank Bank der Ostpreußischen Landschaft, credit union Kreditverband Memelländischer Grundbesitzer, and unregistered credit union Agraria Kreditgesellschaft. These institutions were used to finance and support pro-Nazi party Socialist People's Union of the Klaipėda Region (Sozialistische Volksgemeinschaft des Memelgebiets or SOVOG), headed by Ernst Neumann.

In 1933, Bertuleit joined the NSDAP. He became a deputy of Neumann and was tried for anti-Lithuanian activities during the Neumann–Sass case (December 1934 – March 1935). He received a twelve-year prison sentence but due to the German pressure was released from the Lithuanian imprisonment on 14 February 1938. When December 1938 elections to the Parliament of the Klaipėda Region elected a pro-German majority, Bertuleit was appointed as the President of the Directorate of the Klaipėda Region. After the 20 March 1939 ultimatum, Lithuania had to transfer the region to Germany. Bertuleit participated at the signing of the transfer treaty in Berlin and coordinated the transition until 1 August. As the Directorate and the Parliament of the Klaipėda Region were liquidated, Bertuleit became a member of the Reichstag on 25 April.

Bertuleit was a member of SA and received the rank of SA-Sturmbannführer in 1939. He died in 1941 as a member of the armed forces during the war against the Soviet Union.
