= Union of Christian Socialist Workers of the Memel Region =

Political party in Klaipėda Region active between 1933 and 1934

Union of Christian Socialist Workers of the Memel Region Christlich Sozialistische Arbeitsgemeinschaft des Memelgebiets
- Abbreviation: CSA
- Chairman: Theodor Freiherr von Sass
- Adjutant Deputy: Hanno von der Ropp
- Head of Affairs: P. Klein
- Personal Secretary: Ernst Gaebler
- Founded: 1 June 1933; 93 years ago
- Banned: 13 July 1934; 92 years ago
- Headquarters: Klaipėda
- Paramilitary wing: Secret strike squads (German: Sturm Kolonne)
- Membership: 18 (February 1933); 2258 (early 1934)
- Ideology: Nazism; Christian fascism
- Political position: Far-right
- Colours: Black White Red; Brown (customary)
- Anthem: "Horst-Wessel-Lied"

The Union of Christian Socialist Workers of the Memel Region (German: Christlich Sozialistische Arbeitsgemeinschaft des Memelgebiets, Lithuanian: Klaipėdos krašto krikščionių socialistų darbininkų sąjunga) or CSA was a far-right Nazi party in the Klaipėda Region.

== History ==
The Union of Christian Socialist Workers of the Memel Region was registered on 1 June 1933 in Klaipėda, known in German as Memel. It consisted of the secret Klaipėda branch of the Nazi Party. Its 18 members, declaring their loyalty to the Government of Lithuania and calling themselves the CSA list, participated in the elections to the Seimelis of Klaipėda on 22 May 1933 and won them. On the instructions of the NSDAP leadership in Munich, Theodor von Sass, a priest of the Klaipėda Evangelical Lutheran Church, and Hanno von der Ropp, the Chief Prosecutor of the Klaipėda Regional Court, reorganized the list into a party.

The leadership of the region consisted of 7 people: chairman Theodor Freiherr von Sass, Adjutant Deputy Hanno von der Ropp, Personal Secretary Ernst Gaebler, Head of Affairs P. Klein, and others. The counties leadership consisted of 4 commanders, who led the commanders of districts groups, blocks, and cells. Following the example of the NSDAP strikers, the CSA organized 9 detachments. Firstly they were named hall guards (German: Saalschutz), later strike squads (German: Sturm Kolonne). The CSA published the Nazi newspaper People's Courier (German: Volkskurier).

At the beginning of 1934, the CSA had 2,258 members who were civil servants, reserve officers, teachers. The CSA coordinated its activity with Karl Motz, head of the East Division of the NSDAP Munich office, Hans Moser, head of the Tilsit County NSDAP, Hofmann, head of the Sturmabteilung (SA) of Tilsit, and Erich Koch, Oberpräsident of East Prussia.

The leaders of the old German parties in the Klaipėda Region (Memel Agricultural Party and Memel People's Party) convinced the NSDAP leadership that Sass was too weak to implement the plans of the Nazis and nominated Ernst Neumann as the head of the CSA. Nevertheless, Sass refused to hand over leadership, hoping for Adolf Hitler's personal decision. Consequently, Neumann then formed a new political party based on Nazism, the Sozialistische Volksgemeinschaft des Memelgebiets (SOVOG), and a struggle for power began between the CSA and SOVOG. The German consul H. Strack tried to reconcile and unite the two sides on 2 July 1933. A few months later, when the SOVOG strengthened itself, the NSDAP stopped funding the CSA, and many of its members switched to SOVOG.

The Lithuanian authorities did not immediately evaluated the Nazi activities of the CSA and at first they were glad that the CSA was destroying the old German parties in the Klaipėda Region. On 9 February 1934, Jonas Navakas, the Governor of Klaipėda, on the basis of a special law of 8 February 1934, issued for the protection of the Nation and the State (from insults and service to foreign states), arrested the leaders of the CSA and SOVOG and suspended the activities of the CSA.

On 24 December 1934, the trial of Neumann and Sass was started during which the leaders and members of the CSA and SOVOG political parties were sentenced to death and imprisonment in a heavy labor prison by the Court of the Lithuanian Armed Forces. The decision was appealed to the Supreme Tribunal of Lithuania, however it left the previous court decision unchanged. Neumann was sentenced to twelve years imprisonment in a heavy labor prison, while Sass and Ropp – eight years in a heavy labor prison.

On 13 July 1934, by the order of the military commandant, the CSA and SOVOG political parties were banned.
