= Trial of Neumann and Sass =

1935 mass trial of Nazis in Lithuania

Coordinates: 54°53′56″N 23°54′20″E

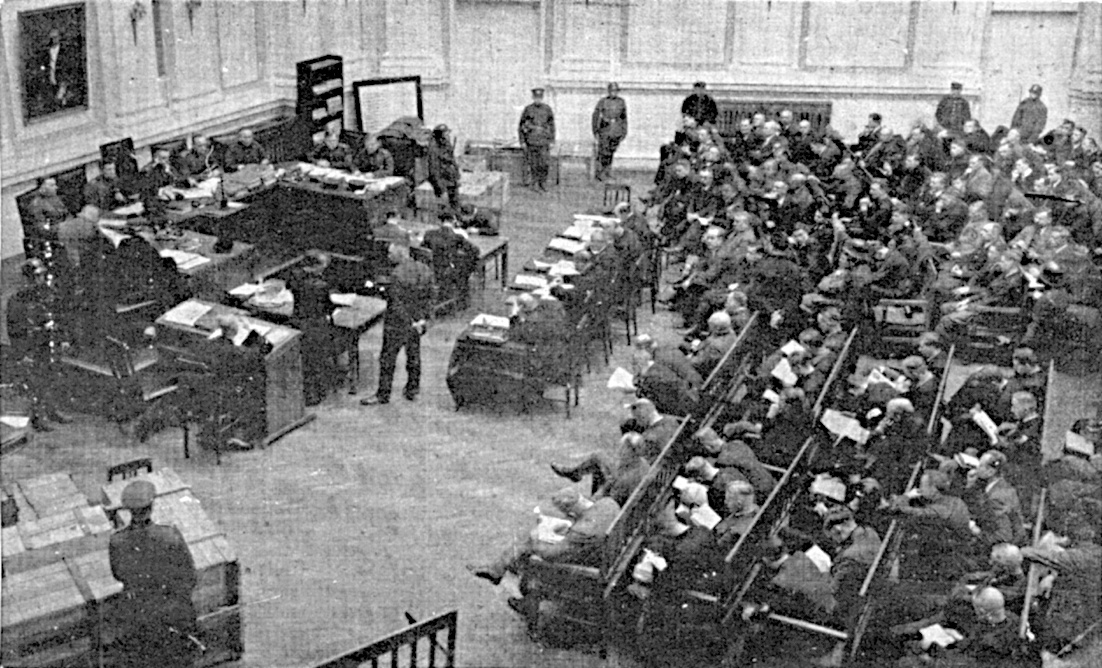
- Court hearing
- Court: Court of the Lithuanian Armed Forces
- Decided: 24 December 1934 – 26 March 1935

Case history
- Appealed to: Supreme Tribunal of Lithuania
- Subsequent actions: Accused Nazis sentenced to death and imprisonment in a heavy labor prison
- Related action: The Supreme Tribunal of Lithuania confirmed the sentences imposed by the Court of the Lithuanian Armed Forces.

Court membership
- Judge sitting: Silvestras Leonas (chairman)

Case opinions
- Severely criticized by the Nazi Party, Nazi Germany requested for a secret trial with light penalties, States of the Triple Entente urged for a secret trial

The trial of Neumann and Sass (Lithuanian: Noimano-Zaso teismo procesas; German: Neumann-Sass-Kriegsgerichtsprozess), also known as the Kaunas Trials, was among the largest mass trials of Nazis in the early 1930s, held in Lithuania against Nazi Party members from local German minority in Klaipėda, accused of planning insurrection with the goal of detaching Klaipėda from Lithuania and joining it to Germany. The trial resulted in the convictions of the leaders of regional Nazi parties, Theodor von Sass, Ernst Neumann, and other party members for their activity in the Klaipėda Region.

The trial process was held in the Lithuanian Palace of Justice and the Parliament, in Kaunas, in 1935. Some of the trial's 69 hearings were held as a public trial upon invitation, despite requests from Nazi Germany and urging from the states of the Entente to organise a secret trial. The trial drew attention across Europe and was attended by many international journalists. The convicted Nazis were sentenced to death or to penal labour by the Court of the Lithuanian Armed Forces. Following an appeal, the Supreme Tribunal of Lithuania left the court's judgment and verdict unchanged. Foreign pressure made Lithuania later grant amnesty to all convicts before they had completed their sentences, and none of the executions were carried out.

== Background ==
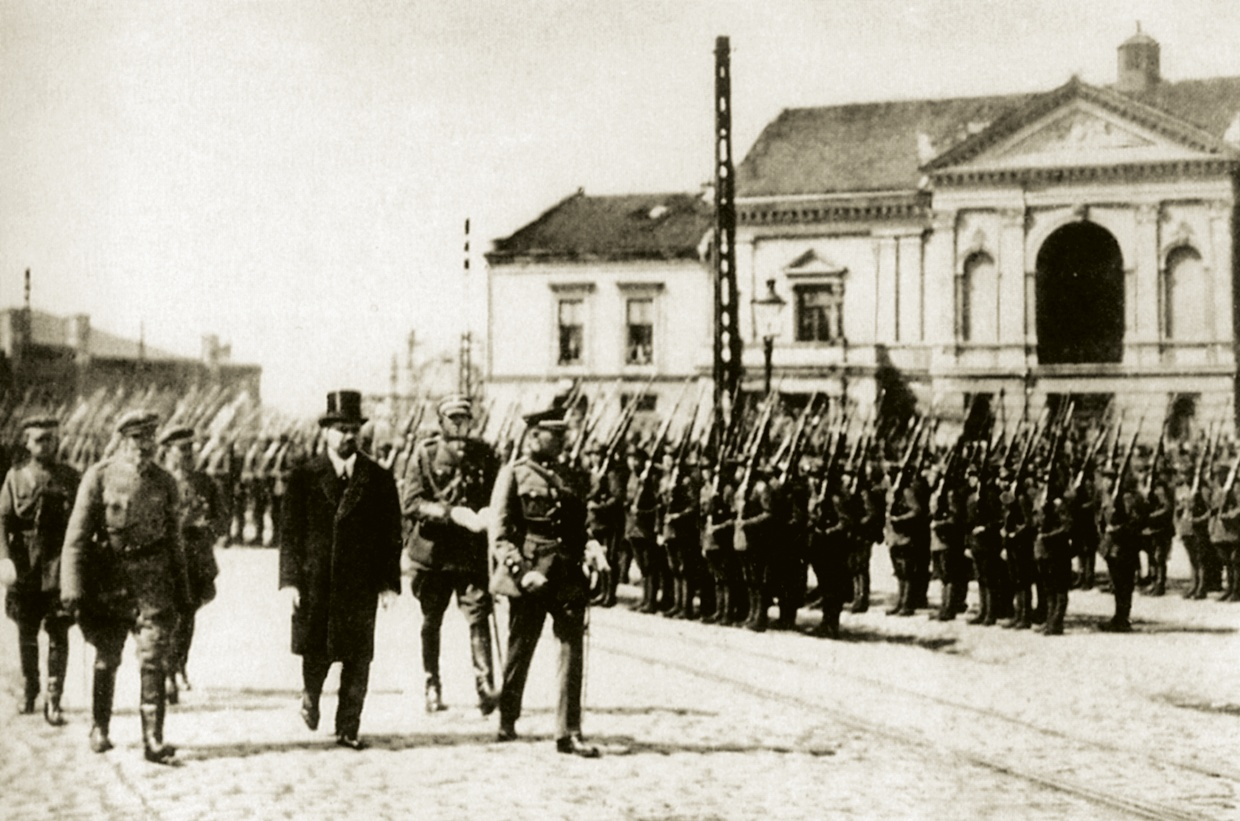
Lithuanian Prime Minister Ernestas Galvanauskas participates in the rebels parade in Klaipėda, 1923

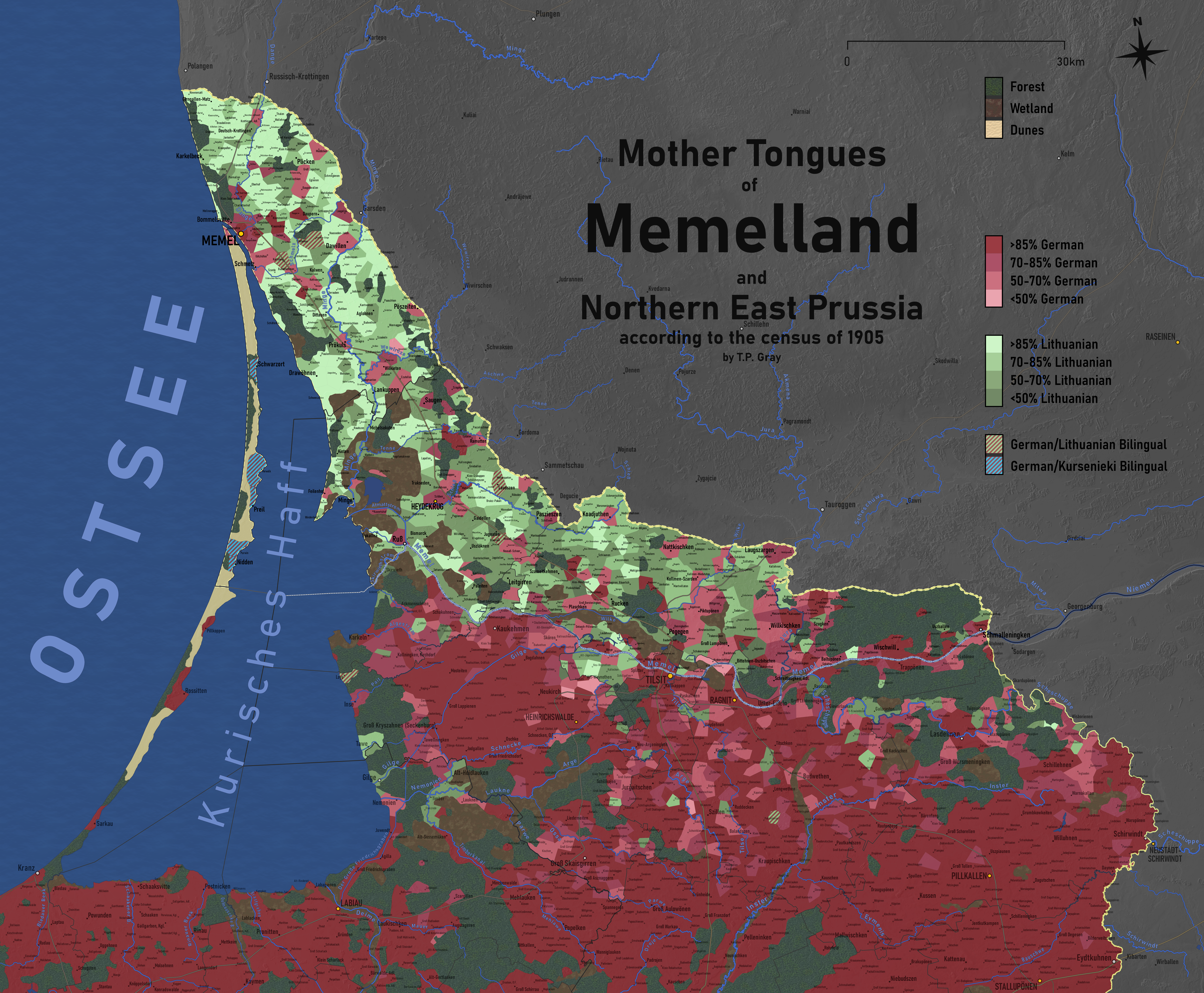
Mother tongues and religious confessions of Memelland in 1905; in contrast to the rest of Lithuania, the population of the Klaipėda Region was overwhelmingly Lutheran

The Klaipėda Region was detached from East Prussia, in the German Empire, by the Treaty of Versailles in 1919 and became a mandate of the League of Nations under provisional French administration until a more permanent resolution could be worked out. Lithuania acquired the region after the Klaipėda Revolt of 10–15 January 1923, which had been carried out mainly by soldiers and volunteers from Lithuania. According to Lithuanian intelligence, about 60% of the region's population supported an uprising, about 30% were neutral, and only about 10% supported a free state.

The Klaipėda Region consisted of four administrative territorial units: the city of Klaipėda and the counties of Klaipėda, Šilutė, and Pagėgiai (about 5% of the territory of Lithuania). A Lithuanian census carried out in the region in 1925 found its total population was 141,000. The census classified inhabitants by declared language as 43.5 percent German, 27.6 percent Lithuanian, and 25.2 percent "Klaipėdan" (Memelländisch). Lithuanian and German authors argued about whether the Klaipėdians (Memellanders) were Lithuanian or German, and the Lithuanian government believed they were Germanized Lithuanians.

However, by tradition, the population of the region generally supported Germany, rather than Lithuania. German politicians promoted a Memellander ideology and argued that Germans and local Lithuanians were "two ethnicities (Volkstümer), yet one cultural community (Kulturgemeinschaft)". In 1924, the Klaipėda Convention between Lithuania, the United Kingdom, France, Italy, and Japan was signed. It guaranteed the autonomy of the region within Lithuania. The convention also granted the right for the residents of the region to decide on citizenship. After an agreement between Lithuania and Germany in February 1925, German citizens were allowed to depart to Germany. In 1925–1933, 17,730 people departed from the Klaipėda Region.

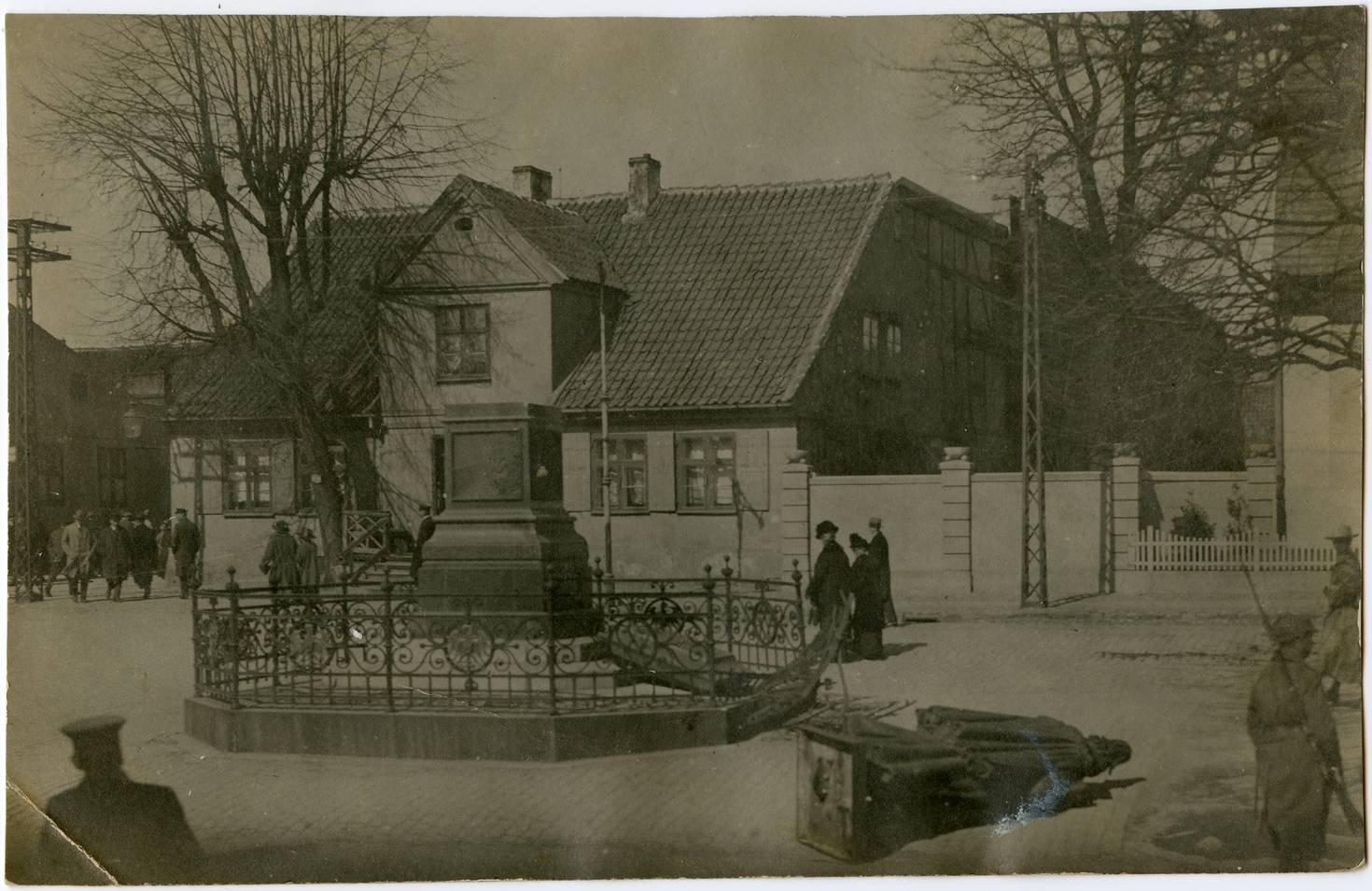
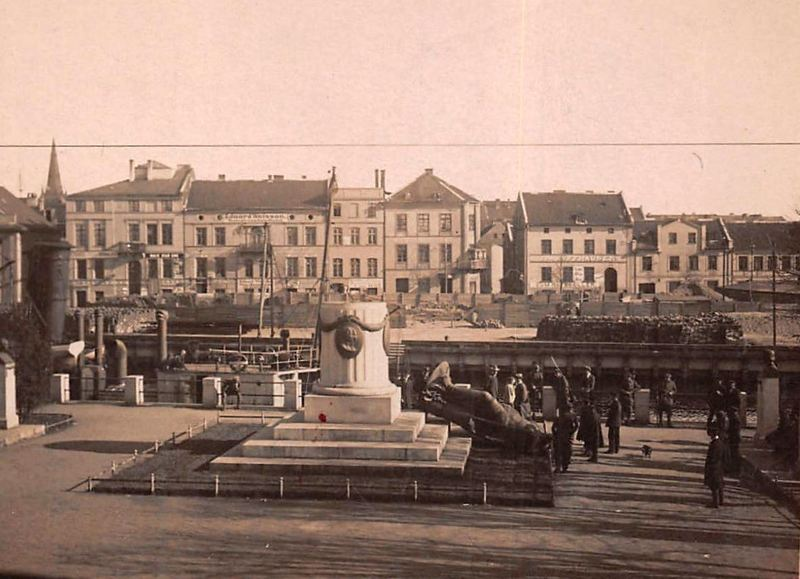
Demolished monuments of Kaiser Wilhelm I (left) and Borussia (right) in Klaipėda, 1923

Lithuania's acquisition of the Klaipėda Region damaged the region's economy and resulted in growing unemployment and local hostility towards Lithuania. German nationalists began to take advantage of the situation, which worsened over time.

On 6 April 1923, strikes and demonstrations, organized by nationalists and communists, began in the region. At night, unidentified activists demolished monuments of Kaiser Wilhelm I and Borussia, which had symbolized German culture and statehood in the region. The German population of the region considered that to be a Lithuanian provocation, but Lithuanians denied.

Another obstacle to the Lithuanian government's plans to Lithuanize the region and its population was the Klaipėdans' (Memellanders') opposition to the government and their support for pro-German parties in the elections to the Parliament of the Klaipėda Region (Lithuanian: Seimelis). Moreover, the Germans had considerable influence in all government bodies. The anti-Lithuanian activities in the region were heavily financed by various German financial institutions. According to Klaipėda Governor Antanas Merkys (1927–1932), the deteriorating situation of the region was dangerous in 1927, and in 1930, school curriculums classified Lithuanian as a foreign language, which was seldom studied.

On 29 June 1931, Joseph Goebbels participated in an event in nearby Tilsit and claimed that the aim of the National Socialists was for the Klaipėda Region to be ceded to Germany as part of the restoration of the pre-war German borders. This rhetoric was supported by the Nazi press.

The German-Lithuanian Klaipėda Regional Union, whose members slandered Lithuanians and advocated for the region to be returned to Germany, was established in Berlin and had branches in Tilsit and Königsberg. The “Kulturverband der Deutschen Litauens” financed German schools, boarding schools, bookstores, libraries, and clubs; it also organized celebrations and, from 1933, actively promoted National Socialism in Lithuania. The anti-Lithuanian activities were co-ordinated and financed by the German consulate in Klaipėda.

== Crimes ==
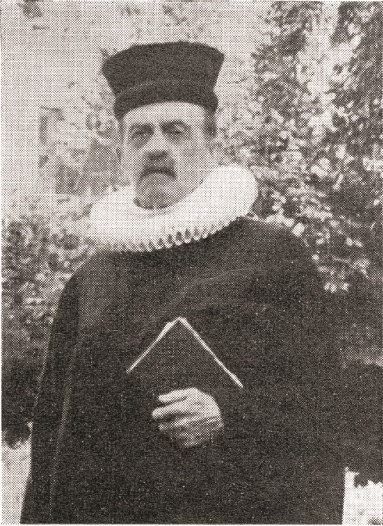
Theodor Freiherr von Sass

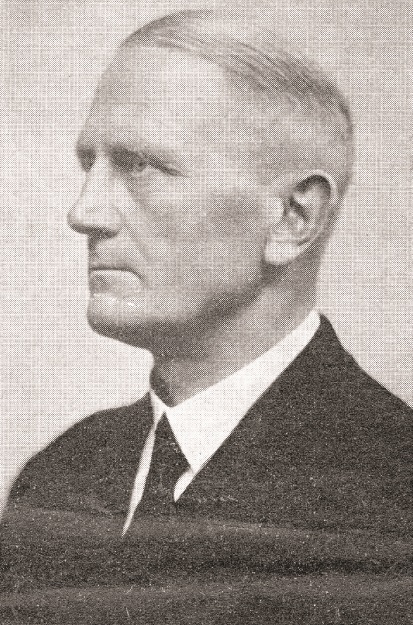
Ernst Neumann

The accused at the trial of Neumann and Sass were leaders and active members of the Union of Christian Socialist Workers of the Memel Region (Christlich Sozialistische Arbeitsgemeinschaft des Memelgebiets, or CSA) and the Socialist People's Union of the Memel Region (Sozialistische Volksgemeinschaft des Memelgebiets, SOVOG); both political parties had been established in 1933. A clandestine branch of the National Socialist German Workers' Party (NSDAP) was located in Klaipėda starting in 1928. After Adolf Hitler's coming to power on 30 January 1933, their activity increased. On 22 May 1933, the region's Nazis, who were members of the CSA, took part in the Klaipėda regional elections. The party was led by the Lutheran minister Theodor von Sass, Hanno von der Ropp, and Secretary Ernst Gaebler.

Shortly thereafter, the pro-German politicians of the region convinced the NSDAP leadership that Sass was too weak to implement the plans of the Nazis and that Neumann should be appointed the Nazi commander of the region. Sass refused, however, to give up his party's leadership to Neumann. Consequently, Neumann and Wilhelm Bertuleit established the SOVOG political party, which had 5,986 members. That resulted in a struggle for power between the CSA and SOVOG; the SOVOG rose to greater influence, and the NSDAP stopped funding the CSA.

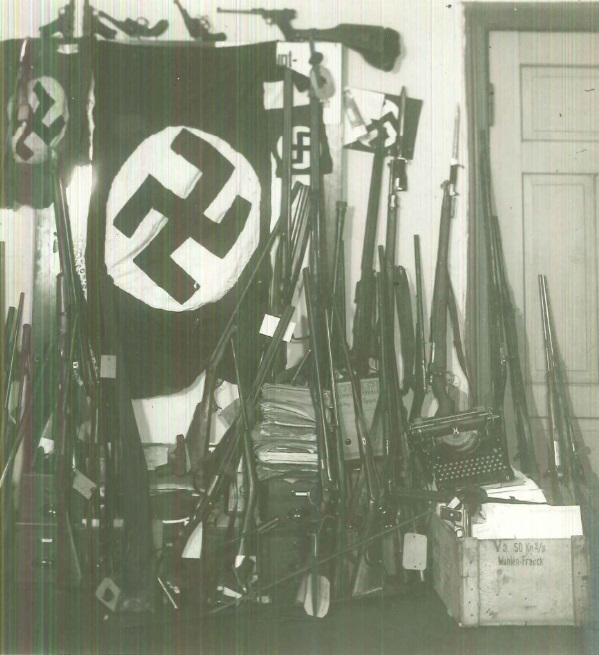
Weaponry and flags of the detained Nazis

Both the SOVOG and CSA parties actively recruited new members. While stating its loyalty to Lithuania, the SOVOG conducted secret activities against the state. Members of the SOVOG acted throughout the entire Klaipėda Region and had county leaders and secret strike squads (German: Sturm Kolonne), which were based on the principles of the Sturmabteilung (SA) and Schutzstaffel and performed military training, espionage, and terrorist acts. In early 1934, the SOVOG and CSA planned a joint insurrection in the Klaipėda Region with the aim of separating the region from Lithuania. The insurrection would have been accompanied by invasion by the members of the Sturmabteilung (SA), which was concentrated near the border. The NSDAP trained members of both parties.

The Lithuanian authorities became interested in the activities of both parties in 1934 and launched a thorough investigation of both. After the Lithuanian State Security Police's successful infiltration of both parties and the recruitment of agents providing information on the leadership's activities, Neumann and Sass were arrested. Among 805 party members, the investigators found 1,104 firearms and many works of illegal NSDAP propaganda.

== Prosecution ==
Part of the defendants in the trial of Neumann and Sass with evidence in 1935

A total of 126 people were prosecuted, of whom 92 were from the SOVOG and 34 from the CSA. The Nazis attempted to disturb the prosecution process by killing G. Jesuttis, the chief Wachtmeister of the Klaipėda Regional Court, since they feared of him testifying about the Nazi activities in the region. The local Nazis also attempted to assassinate Wilhem Lopp, who collaborated with the Lithuanian authorities.

On 13 August 1934, both political parties were banned.

The final criminal case contained 32 volumes and an indictment of 528 pages. Charges were filed against 123 Nazis, half of whom were aged 18–26.

== Trial ==
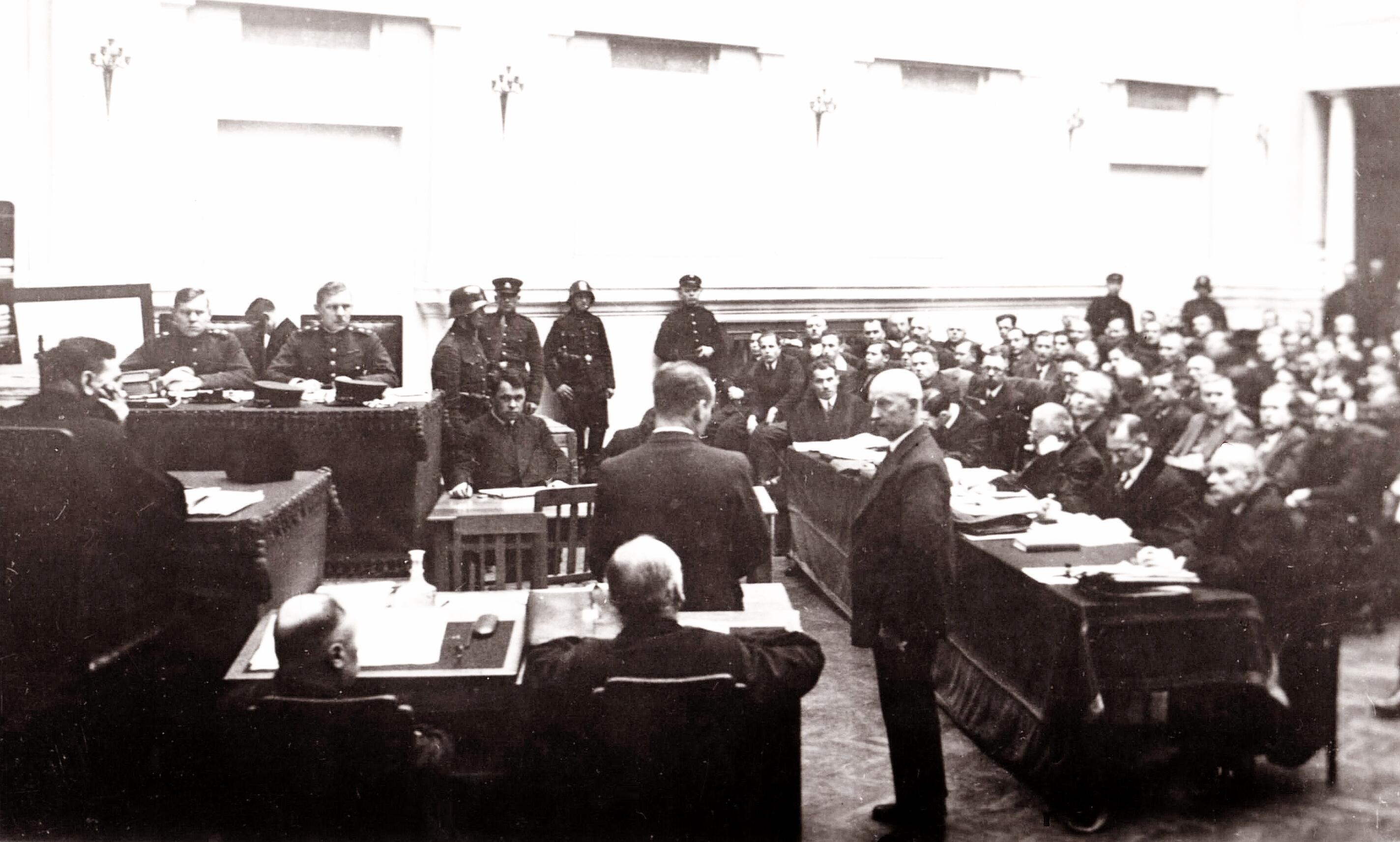
Court hearing

The trial is described as the first mass trial of the Nazis by many Lithuanian sources, albeit they had been preceded by mass trials of Austrian Nazis by the Austrian government after the failed July Putsch. Lithuania planned a public trial in Kaunas Sports Hall on 5 November 1934, which would have been broadcast on Lithuanian radio, but Nazi Germany, supported by the Triple Entente, demanded a secret trial and light penalties. Nevertheless, Lithuania held a partly public trial (upon invitation). Moreover, Lithuanian authorities translated some of the court's documents into French for easier understanding of the process for the European public and, upon invitation, allowed journalists from the United Kingdom, France, Sweden, Poland, Nazi Germany, the Soviet Union, and the United States to observe the trial in the courtroom.

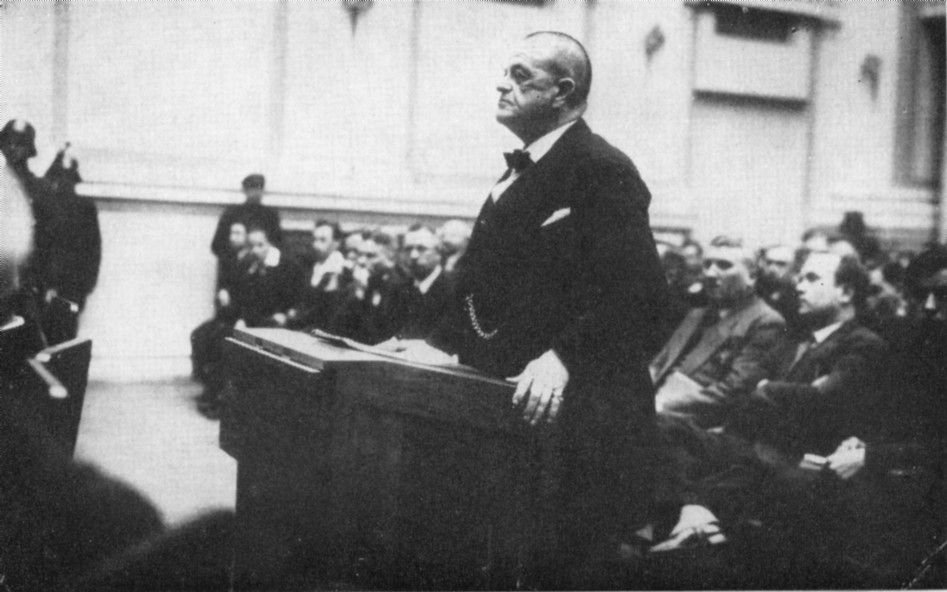
Sass in a tribune during his trial

The case was tried in a military court, as Lithuania had been in a state of war since 1926. The court was chaired by Silvestras Leonas, the First Colonel of the Lithuanian Armed Forces, and the prosecutors were General Emilis Vymeris, the Prosecutor of the Military Court, and Dionizas Monstavičius, the Assistant Prosecutor of the Palace of Appeal; the defendants had their own defenders. Moreover, nine lawyers and two linguists were part of an editorial commission. 507 witnesses testified in the court, including Martin Reisgys.

Despite the comprehensive evidence that was presented, the defendants said they were not guilty. They claimed that the Nazi parties were legal and that they only admired Nazism and had no secret anti-Lithuanian plans. An accused SOVOG member, Moninnus, admitted to his guilt and to the group's subversive activities. An accused, Kubbutat, confessed to taking part in military exercises and being coached on his testimony by German officials. The trial concluded that the Nazis of the Baltic states had collaborated.

Seeking to influence the Lithuanian court's judgement in the trial, Germany mobilized its army near the Lithuanian border, violated Lithuanian airspace, and sent 17 protest notes.

Despite foreign pressure, on 26 March 1935, the Court of the Lithuanian Armed Forces went ahead with sentencing. In total, 14 members of the CSA and 73 members of the SOVOG were convicted and were sentenced to life-long or fixed-term imprisonment in a heavy labor prison. However, the court also acquitted 35 people, and one defendant fled. The most severe penalties were imposed against the assassins of Jesuttis, who were sentenced to death. The Supreme Tribunal of Lithuania upheld the court's decision on appeal.

== Execution of sentences ==
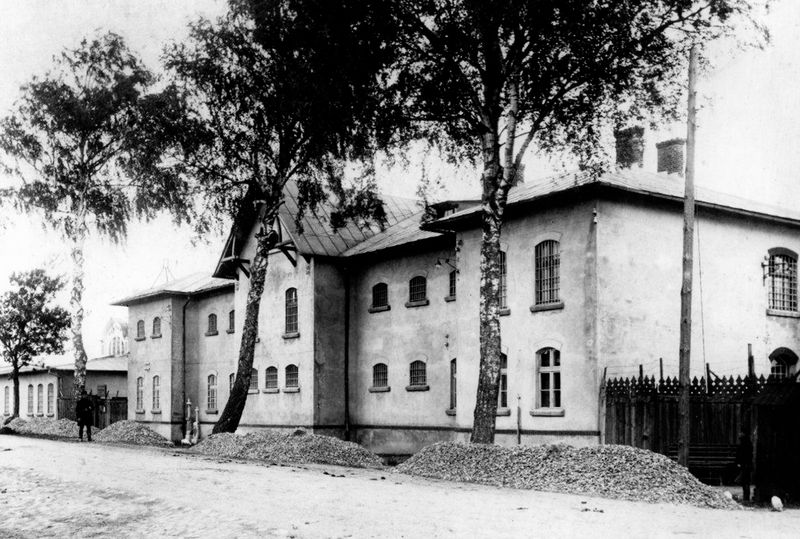
Kretinga (Bajorai) Heavy Labor Prison, where the convicts of the trial of Neumann and Sass were imprisoned in the 1930s. At the order of Neumann, the building was demolished by explosion in 1939.

Lithuanian President Antanas Smetona in May 1935 commuted the death sentences to life imprisonment and released several other convicts in response to foreign pressure. A proposal was then made by Stasys Lozoraitis, the Lithuanian Minister for Foreign Affairs, to exchange Lithuanian political prisoners in Germany for the convicts in the trial. However, Germany rejected the proposal.

In 1937, Smetona dismissed the sentence of Sass and amnestied 35 other convicts, and in 1938, he also amnestied Neumann and Bertuleit. The last amnestied convicts of the trial were four assassins of Jesuttis and two who had attempted to assassinate Lopp. In August 1938, at the request of the Directorate of the Klaipėda Region, all civil rights were restored to the convicted and formerly-convicted Nazis.

== Aftermath ==
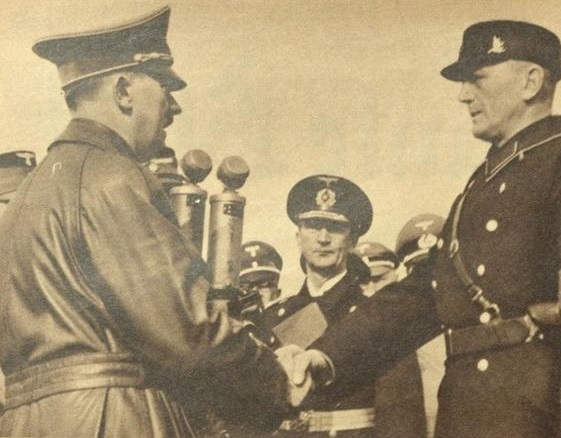
Adolf Hitler shaking hands with Neumann in Klaipėda in March 1939

After the 1939 German ultimatum to Lithuania, Nazi Germany annexed the Klaipėda Region, and in March 1939, Adolf Hitler visited Klaipėda and met personally with Neumann and the others who had been convicted.

The trial of Neumann and Sass revealed Nazi Germany's plans to annex the Klaipėda Region. At the time, it was the largest case of such type to be successfully concluded.

The trial received exceptional criticism in the German press at the time. As a result, Germany began economic pressure by terminating the trade agreement with Lithuania.

In 1934 and 1935, the Lithuanian directorates of the Klaipėda Region, led by Martynas Reizgys and Jurgis Brūvelaitis, fired all followers of Neumann and Sass. Germany reacted by accusing Lithuania of violating the Klaipėda Convention and sent complaints to the League of Nations and to the signatories of the agreement.

At the time, Stasys Lozoraitis sought a démarche (formal diplomatic representation) from the signatory states of the Klaipėda Convention to Nazi Germany, but they began to press Lithuania instead of Nazi Germany. The United Kingdom encouraged France and Italy, which sent a démarche to Lithuania on 13 March 1935. On 30 March, the British suggested for France and Italy to send a common ultimate note to Lithuania. The Italian government of Fascist Italy requested for Lithuanian President Antanas Smetona to pardon the National Socialists, who were sentenced to death. The British representative, Thomas Hildebrand Preston, stressed to Lozoraitis that Lithuania could count on British support only if the "normal functioning of the autonomous system" in Klaipėda was restored. Moreover, Preston also noted the need to back down to Nazi Germany and not to carry out the executions of the convicted National Socialists. France did not provide support to Lithuania either. Furthermore, Lithuania was not supported even by its closest allies in the Baltic Entente: Latvia and Estonia.

The trial of Neumann and Sass exposed Nazi ambitions and methods, but it had minimal effect since adequate measures were not taken to quell the development of Hitlerism or to turn back Germany's increasingly aggressive territorial claims that ultimately led to the outbreak of the Second World War.

== Bibliography ==
- Gerutis, Albertas, ed. (1984). Lithuania: 700 Years. Translated by Budreckis, Algirdas (6th ed.). New York: Manyland Books. ISBN 0-87141-028-1. LCCN 75-80057.
