= Theodor von Sass =

German Lutheran pastor (1881–1958)

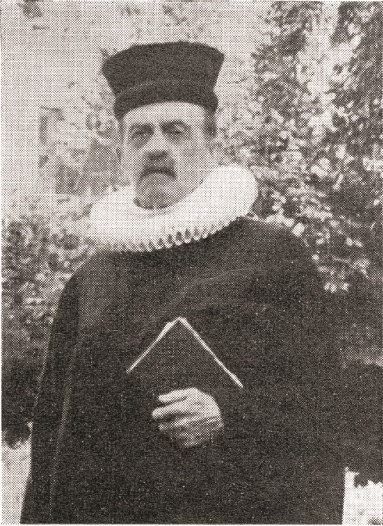
Theodor von Sass

Theodor Freiherr von Sass (18 August 1881 – 9 August 1958), also spelled Saß, was a German Lutheran pastor and community leader in Memelland, a central figure in a legal process known as the Trial of Neumann and Sass. Sentenced in 1935 to 16 years in prison for treason against Lithuania, he was pardoned in 1937 and became a pastor in Wismar in Mecklenburg.

== Early life ==
Born in Komalmen (now in Olsztyn County), East Prussia, Sass was a son of Theodor von Sass, a district administrator. He was educated at the humanistic gymnasium in Allenstein, which he left in Easter 1900, at the University of Freiburg, where he studied law and economics, and then at the University of Strasbourg, where he studied Protestant theology. In the year ending in July 1901 he was a "fox", or new member, in a German Student Corps called the Corps Palaio-Alsatia. He proceeded from there to the University of Königsberg, where he continued to study theology and passed the Hebraicum, a language proficiency test in Hebrew, and both theological examinations required to graduate.

== Career ==
After becoming a Lutheran minister, Sass was appointed as a chaplain at Königsberg, before he took over the management of the family estates at Komalmen and Kattreinen. After they were leased, he became a journalist and editor-in-chief of the Marienwerdersche Nachrichten, a newspaper in Marienwerder, a town in West Prussia.

Returning to his first profession, Sass became pastor at the parish church of St. John in Memel and the English church there. A member of the church council and the synod of the Church of Memelland, in Memel he founded a YMCA, a Jungeschar, or youth organization for children between about nine and thirteen, and the Deutsches Jungvolk, and became leader of the newly formed Union of Christian Socialist Workers of the Memel Region, which was close to National Socialism. On 22 February 1933, this political grouping took part in the elections to the Seimelis of the Klaipėda Region, the Lithuanian name for Memelland, and won them.

At the beginning of 1934, the Union of Christian Socialist Workers had 2,258 members. As leader of it, Sass was accused of treason against Lithuania, and on 17 March 1934, he was arrested. In 1935, in a group of 126 Germans, who included Ernst Neumann, he was court-martialled and sentenced to sixteen years in prison, in a process known as the Trial of Neumann and Sass.

Having been appointed as a ribbon bearer of the Corps Palaio-Alsatia in July 1925, Sass received the ribbon in June 1935, three months after his conviction.

Sass was pardoned on 28 March 1937, at Easter, and was released from prison. He was briefly deputy pastor in Nerkewitz, a village near Jena in Thuringia, and then on 1 October 1937, at his own request, became pastor at the Georgenkirche in Wismar, a parish with 10,000 souls. Many other Memellanders fled to Wismar in the closing stages of the Second World War. Sass gave over the whole of his vicarage to them, limiting himself and his family of six to one room. In 1955, after eighteen years of service in Wismar, at the age of 74 he retired. He died there three years later, shortly before his 77th birthday.

== Personal life ==
In 1920 Sass married Erna Damrau. They had three sons, Günther, born in 1922 in Königsberg, Ulrich, born in 1923 in Memel, and Theodor, born 1926 in Memel. Their daughter Ilse, born in 1924, died at the age of five months.
