= Directorate of the Klaipėda Region =

Executive branch of government of a region of Lithuania (1920–1939)

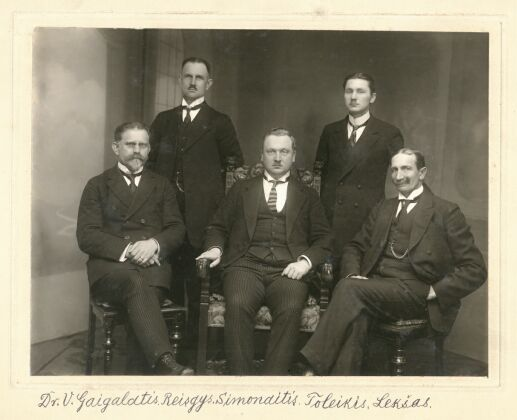
Simonaitis' Directorate, organized to facilitate the Klaipėda Revolt in January 1923

The Directorate of the Klaipėda Region (German: Landesdirektorium; Lithuanian: Klaipėdos krašto direktorija) was the main governing institution (executive branch) in the Klaipėda Region (Memel Territory) from February 1920 to March 1939. It was established by local German political parties to govern the region between the signing of the Treaty of Versailles and establishment of French provision administration. Instead of replacing it, the French legitimized the Directorate. It mainly represented German interests and supported the idea of leaving the region as a free city, similar to the Free City of Danzig. Dismayed Lithuanian government and Prussian Lithuanian activists, who campaigned for incorporation into Lithuania, organized the Klaipėda Revolt in January 1923. The revolt was staged as a popular uprising against the unbearable oppression by the German Directorate. The revolt was successful and the region was incorporated into Lithuania as an autonomous region, governed by the Klaipėda Convention of May 1924.

The relationship between the Directorate, which was more pro-Lithuanian as it was indirectly appointed by the President of Lithuania, and the local parliament, which was more pro-German, was tense. Of the six elected parliaments only two finished their full three-year term. The Directorate also often received votes of no confidence from the parliament and had to be replaced. A procedural dispute over the dismissal of the Otto Böttcher's Directorate in 1932 was only resolved by the Permanent Court of International Justice. The relationship stabilized in late 1930s when both the parliament and the Directorate supported pro-Nazi activities. The growing tension between Nazi Germany and Lithuania resulted in the ultimatum of March 1939. Memel Territory was incorporated into Germany and the autonomous institutions were dissolved.

== French administration ==
According to the Treaty of Versailles of June 1919, Klaipėda Region was detached from East Prussia and placed under provisional French administration. Even before the treaty was officially signed, German political parties held a proto-parliament (German: Vorparlament) and formed the seven-member Executive Committee (German: Arbeitsausschus) to govern the region on the interim basis. On February 10, 1920, the first French troops, commanded by General Dominique Joseph Odry, arrived to the region. A week later Odry recognized the Executive committee, transforming it into the Directorate. Initially all its members were German, which caused protests among the Prussian Lithuanian activists. Two Lithuanians, Erdmonas Simonaitis and Mikelis Reidys, were co-opted on March 12, 1920. Odry resigned on May 1, 1921, leaving Gabriel Jean Petisné the highest-ranking official in the region. He appointed a new Directorate, presided by pro-German Prussian Lithuanian Wilhelm Steputat. In September 1921, he also established 20-member advisory Council of State (German: Staatsrat; Lithuanian: Valstybės taryba). Petisné and the Directorate generally held anti-Lithuanian attitudes and supported turning the region into a free city, similar to the Free City of Danzig. In February 1922, Simonaitis resigned in protest of such policies.

The Directorate was in charge of public institutions (railroad, postal service, customs, etc.), but its jurisdiction over of the police and courts was limited to financial matters. The President of the Directory was the head of the administration and had extensive powers in his own right. The members of the Directorate were appointed and dismissed by the French commissioner.

== Lithuanian takeover and Klaipėda Convention ==
Seeing that the region is likely to become a free city, the Lithuanian government and activists began organizing the Klaipėda Revolt to take the region by force and present the League of Nations with a fait accompli. Lithuanian Prime Minister Ernestas Galvanauskas took great care to represent the revolt as a genuine uprising of the local population against oppression by the German Directorate. Such plan was designed to direct Allied protests away from the Lithuanian government and to exploit the anti-German sentiment in Europe. On January 9, 1923, the Supreme Committee for the Salvation of Lithuania Minor declared that it usurped power in the region, dismissed Steputat's Directorate, and authorized Simonaitis to form a new five-member Directorate within three days. The rebels then petitioned to unite with Lithuania citing the right of self-determination. The League of Nations initially protested the revolt, but quickly accepted the transfer. The Simonaitis' Directorate was disbanded on February 14 to appease the League. The Lithuanians left the region's administration as it was before the revolt until the signing of the Klaipėda Convention, which formalized the transfer of the Klaipėda Region to Lithuania, in May 1924.

The Klaipėda Convention contained the Statute of the Klaipėda Region, which was akin to a regional constitution. While the region became integral part of Lithuania, it was also granted extensive legislative, judicial, administrative, and financial autonomy to preserve "traditional rights and culture of the inhabitants". The region elected its own local Klaipėda Parliament. Members of the Directorate were appointed by the chairman of the Directorate (President), who was appointed by the governor, who in turn was appointed by the President of Lithuania. The Directorate consisted of no more than five members, all of whom had to be residents of the region, and served as long as it had the confidence of the Klaipėda Parliament. The governor in agreement with the Directorate could dissolve the parliament. The Directorate had the right to initiate legislature, issue regional passports, appoint tribunal judges for life, various officials, and one member of the three-member Harbor Board in charge of the port of Klaipėda. Matters specifically placed under local authority of the parliament and Directorate included public worship and education, local administrative divisions, health and social welfare, roads and public works, civil, criminal, and commercial legislation, local police, taxes (except custom duties).

== Lithuanian–German relations ==
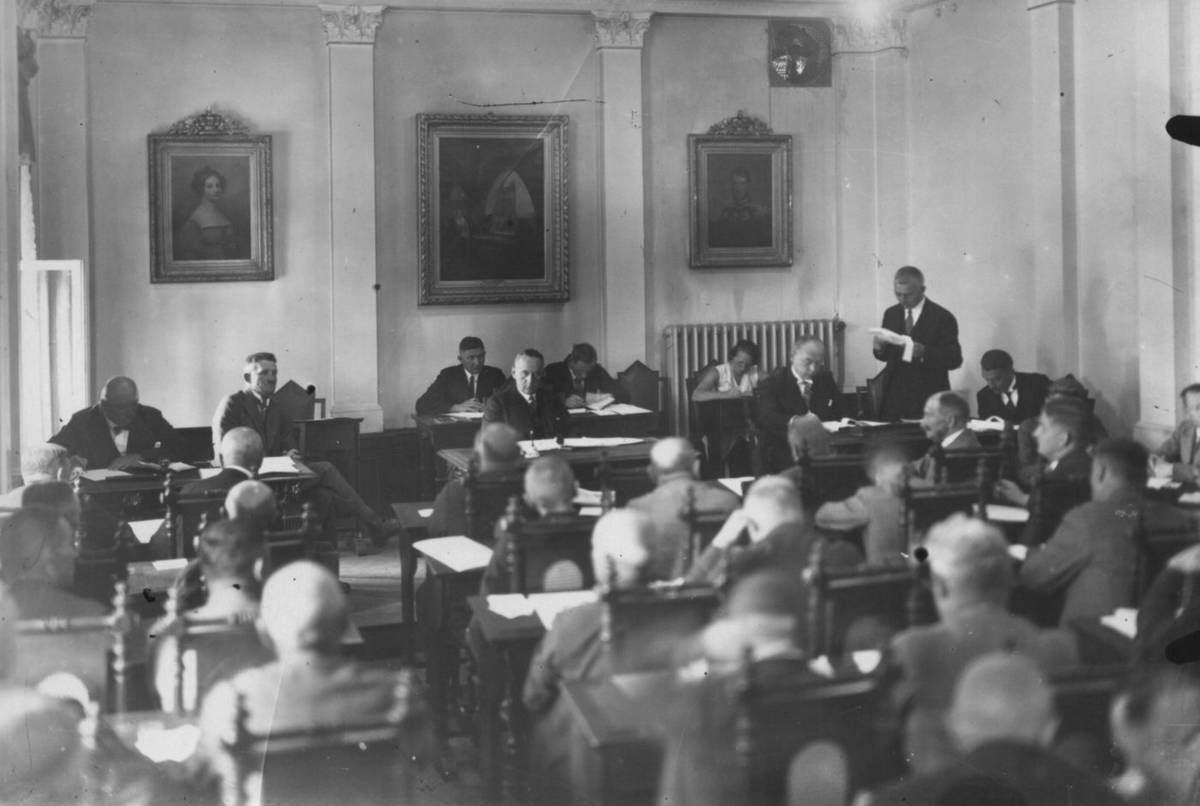
Session of the Directorate of the Klaipėda Region in 1932

The relationship between the Directorate, which was more pro-Lithuanian, and the local parliament, which was more pro-German, was tense and often led to conflicts over the interpretation of the Klaipėda Convention and Statute. Of the six elected parliaments only two finished their full three-year term. The Directorate also often received votes of no confidence from the parliament and had to be replaced. The local tensions reflected growing tensions between Lithuania and Germany, which became increasingly revisionist after the death of Foreign Minister Gustav Stresemann in 1929. As a permanent member of the Council of the League of Nations, Germany used its right, provided by the Convention, to refer the local disputes to the League of Nations.

=== Appointment of Martynas Reisgys ===
In August 1930, a dispute arose over the appointment of pro-Lithuanian Martynas Reisgys. The parliament voted no confidence, Reisgys dismissed the parliament, and Germany submitted the dispute to the League. Lithuania wished to avoid the intervention by the League and compromised with Germany, appointing Otto Böttcher.

=== Dismissal of Otto Böttcher ===
After 1931 customs agreement between Lithuania and Germany, exports of agricultural products from Klaipėda to East Prussia fell sharply. In December 1931, Böttcher and two members of the parliament secretly traveled to Berlin to discuss agricultural imports with German Minister of Foreign Affairs and Minister of Agriculture.

Once the Lithuanians learned about this trip, Governor Antanas Merkys dismissed Böttcher for overstepping his authority as the Klaipėda Convention left foreign affairs as a sole responsibility of the central Lithuanian government. It was the first time that the Directorate was dismissed without approval from the parliament, which alleged that this was illegal under the Convention. Merkys then appointed Jonas Tolišius and Eduardas Simaitis as the Presidents of the Directorate, but neither of them were able to obtain vote of confidence from the parliament. Faced with a deadlock, Merkys and Simaitis dissolved the parliament.

Germany submitted the dispute to the League of Nations, which referred the case to the Permanent Court of International Justice. In August 1932, the Court ruled that Lithuania had the right to dismiss Böttcher and appoint Simaitis, but did not have the right to dissolve the parliament. The new elections to the parliament took place in May 1932. In an attempt to normalize the situation, Governor Merkys was replaced with more liberal career diplomat Vytautas Gylys and President Simaitis with Ottomar Schreiber, who was an industrialist and not a politician.

=== Neumann–Sass case ===
The relative calm was disrupted by Nazi seizure of power in Germany. The local German activist began organizing pro-Nazi parties (Christlich-Sozialistische Arbeitsgemeinschaft or CSA and Sozialistische Volksgemeinschaft or SOVOG) in spring–summer 1933. The Lithuanians responded by appointing hard-line advocate of Lithuanian interest Jonas Navakas as the governor in November 1933. To combat spreading Nazism, CSA and SOVOG were outlawed, its leaders and over 100 members were arrested and put on trial for anti-state activities (the Neumann–Sass case). Navakas demanded that the Directorate dismissed teachers and other officials who were members of anti-state parties or otherwise disloyal to the state.

When Schreiber resisted, the Directorate was dismissed by Navakas, who appointed pro-Lithuanian Martynas Reisgys. It was clear that Reisgys could not obtain vote of confidence from the parliament. Thus two weeks before the parliamentary session, Lithuanian military commander dissolved the Memel Agricultural Party, pro-German party with 11 seats in the parliament, on grounds that it was seditious and prohibited its members from sitting in the parliament. Therefore, the parliament lacked the quorum to dismiss Reisgys.

Germany withdrew from the League in October 1933 over the re-armament and could not directly petition the League of Nations to intervene. Therefore, Germany petitioned the signatories of the Convention, but they delayed and responded only by sending diplomatic notes. Nevertheless, Lithuania responded by replacing Governor Navakas with Kurkauskas and President Reisgys with Brūvelaitis and including a majority of Germans in the Directorate. But even this compromise Directorate faced opposition.

=== German takeover ===
New elections to the parliament were held in November 1935. They were purposefully delayed beyond six-week period allowed by the Convention by the Lithuanians, who hoped to build pro-Lithuanian momentum. Despite the efforts, the Lithuanian candidates received only five seats. Baldžius was appointed the President of the all-German Directorate. In effect, the pro-German forces controlled the region. Relative stability returned, while pro-German and pro-Nazi activists increased their influence. They campaigned for re-attachment of the region to Germany.

Eventually, defendants of the Neumann–Sass case had their sentences commuted and a number of them successfully ran in the December 1938 elections. Wilhelm Bertuleit, Neumann's right-hand man, became the President of the Directorate. It was expected that the new parliament would vote to secede from Lithuania as soon as it convened in March 1939. However, Lithuania "voluntarily" transferred the region to Germany following the ultimatum of March 20, 1939. Following the transfer, the Directorate and the parliament were dissolved.

== Church ==
The Convention outlined organizational structure, competency, and relationship to the central Lithuanian government of the autonomous institutions – the Directorate, local parliament, and governor. This enabled the directorate under Viktoras Gailius to conclude with the Evangelical Church of the old-Prussian Union the Agreement concerning the Evangelical Church of the Memel Territory (German: Abkommen betr. die evangelische Kirche des Memelgebietes) on July 23, 1925, as to the organisation of the Protestant congregations. The Protestant congregations in the Memel Territory were disentangled from the old-Prussian Ecclesiastical Province of East Prussia and formed the Regional Synodal Federation of the Memel Territory (Landessynodalverband Memelgebiet) since, being ranked an ecclesiastical province directly subordinate to the Evangelical Supreme Church Council.

== Presidents of the directorate ==
Presidents of the Directorate
From	To	Tenure	German name	Lithuanian name
1920-02-17	1921-08-05	1 year, 169 days	Arthur Altenberg	Artūras Altenbergas
1921-08-06	1923-01-09	1 year, 156 days	Wilhelm Steputat	Vilius Steputaitis
1923-01-13	1923-02-14	32 days	Erdmann Simoneit	Erdmonas Simonaitis
1923-02-15	1925-02-04	1 year, 355 days	Viktor Gailus	Viktoras Gailius
1925-02-15	1926-01-15	334 days	Heinrich Borchert	Endrius Borchertas
1926-01-16	1926-11-24	312 days	Erdmann Simoneit	Erdmonas Simonaitis
1926-11-25	1927-01-04	40 days	Wilhelm Falk	Vilius Falkas
1927-01-05	1927-12-04	333 days	Wilhelm Schwellnus	Vilius Švelnius
1927-12-05	1930-08-08	2 years, 246 days	Otto Kadgiehn	Otas Kadgynas
1930-08-16	1931-01-12	149 days	Martin Reisgys	Martynas Reisgys
1931-01-13	1932-02-05	1 year, 23 days	Otto Böttcher	Otas Betcheris
1932-02-06	1932-03-01	24 days	Jan Tolischus	Jonas Tolišius
1932-03-02	1932-06-06	96 days	Eduard Simaitis	Eduardas Simaitis
1932-06-07	1934-06-28	2 years, 21 days	Ottomar Schreiber	Otomaras Šreiberis
1934-06-28	1934-12-03	158 days	Martin Reisgys	Martynas Reizgys
1934-12-04	1935-11-27	358 days	Georg Bruweleit	Jurgis Brūvelaitis
1935-11-28	1939-01-19	3 years, 52 days	August Baldszus	Augustas Baldžius
1939-01-19	1939-03-23	63 days	Wilhelm Bertuleit	Vilius Bertulaitas

== Bibliography ==
- Andriulis, Vytautas; Maksimaitis, Mindaugas; Pakalniškis, Vytautas; Pečkaitis, Justinas Sigitas; Šenavičius, Antanas (2002). Lietuvos teisės istorija (in Lithuanian). Vilnius: Justitia. ISBN 9986-567-81-5.
- Čepėnas, Pranas (1986). Naujųjų laikų Lietuvos istorija (in Lithuanian). Vol. II. Chicago: Dr. Kazio Griniaus Fondas. OCLC 3220435.
- Eidintas, Alfonsas; Žalys, Vytautas; Senn, Alfred Erich (1999). Lithuania in European Politics: The Years of the First Republic, 1918-1940 (Paperback ed.). New York: St. Martin's Press. ISBN 0-312-22458-3.
- Gerutis, Albertas, ed. (1984). Lithuania: 700 Years. Translated by Algirdas Budreckis (6th ed.). New York: Manyland Books. ISBN 0-87141-028-1. LCCN 75-80057.
- Gliožaitis, Algirdas Antanas (2003). "Klaipėdos kraštas". Mažosios Lietuvos enciklopedija (in Lithuanian). Vol. 2. Vilnius: Mokslo ir enciklopedijų leidybos institutas. ISBN 5-420-01470-X.
- Himmel, Richard Lynn (August 1975). Years of crisis diplomacy: German-Lithuanian relations, 1933-1939 (PDF). Texas Tech University. OCLC 1966819. Archived from the original (PDF) on 2011-08-15.
- Krivickas, Domas (1937). "Direktorija (Klaipėdos)". In Biržiška, Vaclovas (ed.). Lietuviškoji enciklopedija (in Lithuanian). Vol. 6. Kaunas: Spaudos Fondas. LCCN 37032253.
- Mander, Linden Alfred (1947). Foundations of Modern World Society (revised ed.). Stanford University Press. OCLC 1571273.
- LNTS – League of Nations Treaty Series (1924). Convention concerning the Territory of Memel (PDF). Vol. 29.
- Žiugžda, Robertas (1985). "Direktorija". In Zinkus, Jonas; et al. (eds.). Tarybų Lietuvos enciklopedija (in Lithuanian). Vol. 1. Vilnius: Vyriausioji enciklopedijų redakcija. LCCN 86232954.
