= Klaipėda Convention =

1924 territorial settlement between Lithuania and the Conference of Ambassadors

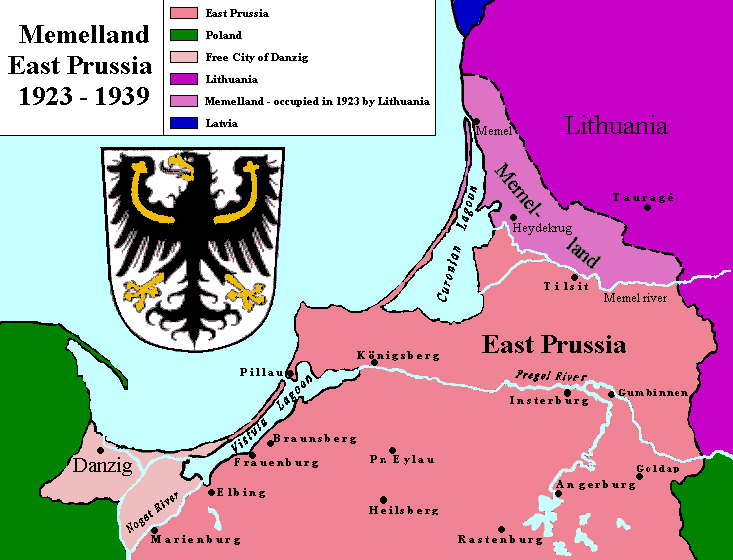
Historical map of Klaipėda Region (Memelland) and the northern part of East Prussia

The Klaipėda Convention (or Convention concerning the Territory of Memel) was an international agreement between Lithuania and the countries of the Conference of Ambassadors (United Kingdom, France, Italy, and Japan) signed in Paris on May 8, 1924. According to the convention, the Klaipėda Region (Memel Territory) became an autonomous region under unconditional sovereignty of Lithuania.

The region was detached from East Prussia by the Treaty of Versailles and placed under League of Nations administration with a provisional French garrison. During the staged Klaipėda Revolt in January 1923, the Lithuanians seized control of the region and attached it to Lithuania. The Conference of Ambassadors accepted the fait accompli and set out to formalise the territorial changes. The inhabitants of the area were not given a choice on the ballot on whether they wanted to join Lithuania or Germany. After difficult negotiations, the convention was agreed upon in spring 1924.

The region was granted extensive legislative, judicial, administrative and financial autonomy. It had its own democratically elected parliament (Klaipėda Diet) and appointed executive branch (the Klaipėda Directorate). The administration and operation of the port of Klaipėda was entrusted to a three-member Harbor Board. The Neman River, particularly its timber traffic, was internationalised, which granted freedom of transit to all nations. The convention became obsolete when the Klaipėda Region was attached to Nazi Germany as a result of the ultimatum of 1939.

== Background ==
The lands north of the Neman River had been part of a German state since their conquest during the Prussian Crusade in the 13th century. According to Article 28 of the Treaty of Versailles, the region was detached from the German Empire, and according to Article 99, it was placed under a League of Nations mandate effective January 10, 1920. The French became temporary administrators of the Klaipėda Region, or Memel Territory. The Lithuanians believed that the region should be attached to Lithuania because of its significant Lithuanian-speaking population of Prussian Lithuanians. Also Klaipėda (Memel), a major sea port in the Baltic Sea, was the only viable access to the sea for Lithuania.

However, such Lithuanian aspirations gained little local or international support. It seemed that the region would be turned into a free city, similar to the Free City of Danzig. Rather than waiting for an unfavourable decision by the Allies, Lithuanian activists decided to organise a revolt, capture the region and present a fait accompli. The revolt, organised by the Lithuanian government and the Lithuanian Riflemen's Union, began on January 9, 1923. The rebels met little resistance and controlled the region by January 15. They organised a new pro-Lithuanian Directorate, the main governing institution, and petitioned to join Lithuania.

On January 24, the First Seimas, the Lithuanian Parliament, accepted the petition and thus formalised the incorporation of the Klaipėda Region into Lithuania. The Conference of Ambassadors decided to dispatch a special commission to the region, reject a military intervention and agree to open negotiations with Lithuania.

== Negotiations ==
On February 16, 1923, the Conference of Ambassadors relinquished its rights that granted by the Treaty of Versailles and transferred the district over to Lithuania under the condition that a formal international treaty would be signed later. Lithuania accepted the transfer, and negotiations over the treaty began on March 24, 1923. A special commission of the Conference, chaired by the French diplomat Jules Laroche, presented a 50-paragraph project, which reserved extensive rights of the Second Polish Republic to access, use and govern the Port of Klaipėda. That was completely unacceptable to Lithuania, which terminated all diplomatic ties with Poland over a bitter dispute over Vilnius Region. The Lithuanian delegation, led by Ernestas Galvanauskas, responded by presenting its own project, which reserved no rights to Poland, in April 1923.

The negotiations resumed in July, when Laroche presented two other projects, which were very similar to the first. Seeing that the situation had become deadlocked, Lithuanians suggested to turn over the case to the Permanent Court of International Justice, but Laroche preferred the League of Nations. The Conference decided to appeal to the League on the basis of Article 11 of the League Covenant. On December 17, 1923, the League authorized a three-man commission to analyze the situation and prepare a report. The commission was headed by the American diplomat Norman Davis and included the Dutch technical expert on transportation A. G. Kröller and the Swedish professor M. Hoernell. The commission visited Klaipėda, Kaunas and Warsaw and presented a draft treaty on February 18, 1924.

After negotiations with the Lithuanians, the League adopted the convention on March 14, 1924, despite Polish protests. The document was signed by Robert Crewe-Milnes, Raymond Poincaré, Camillo Romano Avezzana, Ishii Kikujirō and Ernestas Galvanauskas on May 8. It was registered with the League of Nations Treaty Series on October 3. The convention was ratified by the Entente Powers and took full effect on August 25, 1925. The Lithuanians hailed the final version as their major diplomatic victory since Poland received no special rights in the port.

== Content ==
The convention had 18 articles. The region was transferred to Lithuania without conditional provisions and granted legislative, judicial, administrative and financial autonomy to preserve "traditional rights and culture of the inhabitants". The residents were automatically granted Lithuanian citizenship but were given a window of 18 months to opt out and choose German citizenship. The new Lithuanian citizens were exempt from military service until January 1930. Lithuania agreed to pay war reparations according to the Treaty of Versailles as they related to the region and to the protect rights of minorities and foreign businesses. Any member of the Council of the League of Nations could draw attention of the League to any infractions of the convention, and such disputes would be referred to the Permanent Court of International Justice. That provision was used by Nazi Germany when it supported anti-Lithuanian activities in the region and accused Lithuania of violating minority rights. The region could not be transferred to other countries without the consent of the contracting parties. That article became relevant in 1939 when Lithuania was presented an ultimatum, which demanded the transfer of the region to Germany.

The convention included the statute of region and an agreement on port of Klaipėda and transit as an addendum. The statute of Klaipėda Region had 38 articles and was akin to a constitution. It dealt primarily with detailing the level of legislative, judicial, administrative and financial autonomy granted to the region. The autonomy was given in the name of Lithuania, which was a significant Lithuanian diplomatic achievement, and the four international signatories only confirmed it. Matters specifically placed under local authority included public worship and education; local administrative divisions; health and social welfare; roads and public works; civil, criminal, and commercial legislation; local police and taxes (except custom duties). The region had its own legislative body (Memel Landtag), which was elected for a three-year term in free democratic elections. The President of Lithuania appointed a governor of the region. The governor could not veto laws passed the local parliament unless they violated the statute, the Constitution of Lithuania or international agreements. The reasons for a veto did not include laws that were contrary to the interest of Lithuania. The five-member Directorate was appointed by the governor and served as the executive institution as long as it had confidence of the parliament. The governor, in agreement with the Directorate, could dissolve the parliament. The Directorate appointed tribunal judges for life. The Lithuanian and German languages were given equal status as official languages of the region. Amending the statute required a three-fifths majority in the local parliament and could be submitted for approval to a local referendum.

Schedule of war reparations for Klaipėda Region per agreement of February 15, 1930
Date of payment	Total (in gold marks)	To France (in francs)	To Great Britain (in pounds)	To Italy (in Italian lira)
15 days after signing	800,000	4,725,998	90,882	–
December 15, 1930	1,000,000	5,886,873	113,180	16,273
December 15, 1931	1,000,000	5,907,505	113,590	–
December 15, 1932	1,000,000	5,907,505	113,590	–

The agreement on port of Klaipėda specified that it was a port of international concern and that the Barcelona Convention and Statute on the Regime of Navigable Waterways of International Concern applied. The agreement established a three-member Harbor Board charged with administration, operation, and development of the port. One member was appointed by the Lithuanian government, another by the Directorate and the last by the League of Nations. The transit agreement had four articles, guaranteed freedom of transit and concerned particularly the export and the import of timber via the Neman River.

== Sources ==
- Andriulis, Vytautas; Mindaugas Maksimaitis; Vytautas Pakalniškis; Justinas Sigitas Pečkaitis; Antanas Šenavičius (2002). Lietuvos teisės istorija (in Lithuanian). Vilnius: Justitia. ISBN 9986-567-81-5.
- Eidintas, Alfonsas; Vytautas Žalys; Alfred Erich Senn (1999). Lithuania in European Politics: The Years of the First Republic, 1918–1940 (Paperback ed.). New York: St. Martin's Press. ISBN 0-312-22458-3.
- Gerutis, Albertas, ed. (1984). Lithuania: 700 Years. translated by Algirdas Budreckis (6th ed.). New York: Manyland Books. ISBN 0-87141-028-1. LCCN 75-80057.
- Gliožaitis, Algirdas Antanas (2003). "Klaipėdos krašto konvencija". Mažosios Lietuvos enciklopedija (in Lithuanian). Vol. 2. Vilnius: Mokslo ir enciklopedijų leidybos institutas. ISBN 5-420-01470-X.
- LNTS – League of Nations Treaty Series (1924). Convention concerning the Territory of Memel (PDF). Vol. 29.
- Pėteraitis, Vilius, ed. (2003). "Klaipėdos krašto okupacijos ir administracijos išlaidų atlyginimo protokolas". Mažosios Lietuvos enciklopedija (in Lithuanian). Vol. 2. Vilnius: Mokslo ir enciklopedijų leidybos institutas. ISBN 5-420-01470-X.
