= 1939 German ultimatum to Lithuania =

German diplomatic demand on Lithuania

East Prussia after the ultimatum took force; the Klaipėda Region/Memelland is depicted in striped green and East Prussia in beige.

On 20 March 1939, the German Reich's foreign minister Joachim von Ribbentrop presented an oral ultimatum to Juozas Urbšys, foreign minister of Lithuania. Germany demanded that Lithuania give up the Klaipėda Region (also known as the Memel Territory), which had been detached from Germany after World War I, or the Wehrmacht would invade Lithuania and the de facto Lithuanian capital Kaunas would be bombed. The Lithuanians had been expecting the demand after years of rising tension between Lithuania and Germany, increasing pro-Nazi propaganda in the region, and continued German expansion. It was issued just five days after the Nazi occupation of Czechoslovakia.

The 1924 Klaipėda Convention had guaranteed the protection of the status quo in the region, but the four signatories to that convention did not offer any material assistance. The region had been detached from East Prussia by the Treaty of Versailles and placed under League of Nations administration with a provisional French garrison. During the staged, Lithuanian-backed Klaipėda Revolt in January 1923, the Lithuanians seized control of the region and attached it to Lithuania, which The League of Nations accepted as fait accompli.

The United Kingdom and France followed a policy of appeasement, while Italy and Japan openly supported Germany, and Lithuania accepted the ultimatum on 23 March 1939. It proved to be the last territorial acquisition for Germany before World War II, producing a major downturn in Lithuania's economy and escalating pre-war tensions for Europe as a whole.

== Klaipėda dispute ==
Klaipėda (German: Memel), an important seaport in East Prussia, was detached from Germany by Article 28 of the Treaty of Versailles and was governed by the Allies according to Article 99. France assumed administration of the region while Lithuania continued to lobby for its control, claiming that it should belong to Lithuania as it had a significant Lithuanian population (see Lithuania Minor) and was that country's only access to the Baltic Sea. Poland also laid claim to the territory. As the Allies were hesitant to make a decision and it seemed that the region would remain a free state much like the Free City of Danzig, Lithuania took the initiative and organized the Klaipėda Revolt in January 1923. Soviet Russia and Germany supported the action. The region, as an autonomous territory with its own parliament (Klaipėda Parliament), was attached to Lithuania. The region covered about 2,400 square kilometres (930 sq mi) and had a population of approximately 140,000.

During the 1920s, Lithuania and Germany maintained a relatively normal relationship as they were united by anti-Polish sentiment. In January 1928, after long and difficult negotiations, Germany and Lithuania signed a border treaty, which left Klaipėda on the Lithuanian side. However, tensions began rising in the 1930s after Nazi Germany replaced the Weimar Republic. An especially tense period came in February 1934 when the Lithuanian government arrested dozens of pro-Nazi activists. In response to these arrests and trials, Germany declared a boycott of Lithuanian agricultural imports. The boycott caused an economic crisis in Suvalkija (southern Lithuania), where farmers organized violent protests. However, after the referendum in Saar, most of the pro-Nazi prisoners received amnesty. In the wake of the amnesties, Lithuanian prestige suffered both abroad and in Klaipėda, allowing Germany to strengthen its influence in the region.

== Rising tension ==
In the spring of 1938, Adolf Hitler personally stated that gaining Klaipėda was one of his highest priorities, second only to gaining the Sudetenland. When Poland presented its ultimatum to Lithuania in March 1938, Germany openly declared that in the event of a military clash between Poland and Lithuania, its army would invade Lithuania to capture Klaipėda and a large portion of western Lithuania. A week after Lithuania accepted the Polish ultimatum, Germany presented an eleven-point memorandum that demanded freedom of action for pro-German activists in the region and a lessening of Lithuanian influence there. Its points were worded in a deliberately vague manner, which would enable Germany to accuse Lithuania of violations. Lithuania chose to postpone dealing with the problem, hoping that the international situation would improve. In the meantime, it hoped to give the German population no reasons for complaint.

This tactic did not prove successful; pro-Nazi propaganda and protests were rampant, even among the Lithuanian population, and the local government was powerless to prevent them. The Nazis physically harassed Lithuanian organizations. On 1 November 1938, Lithuania was pressured into lifting martial law and press censorship. During the December elections to the Klaipėda Parliament, pro-German parties received 87% of votes (25 seats out of 29) in the Klaipėda territory. Dr. Ernst Neumann, the chief defendant in the 1934 trials, was released from prison in February 1938 and became the leader of Klaipėda's pro-German movement. In December, he was received by Adolf Hitler, who assured him that the Klaipėda issue would be resolved by March or April 1939. Neumann and other Nazi activists claimed the right of self-determination for the region and demanded that Lithuania open negotiations over the political status of Klaipėda. The parliament was expected to vote for a return to Germany when it convened on 25 March 1939. Germany's official channels maintained silence on the issue. Germany hoped that Lithuania would voluntarily give up the troubled region, and a public stance could have disturbed the sensitive discussions it was then engaged in with Poland over an anti-Communist alliance against the Soviet Union.

== The ultimatum ==
Hitler making a speech in Memel the day after the ultimatum was accepted

Rumors had reached the Lithuanian government to the effect that Germany had specific plans to take over Klaipėda. On 12 March, Foreign Minister Urbšys represented Lithuania at the coronation of Pope Pius XII in Rome. On his return to Lithuania, he stopped in Berlin with the hope of clarifying the growing rumors. On 20 March, Ribbentrop agreed to meet with Urbšys, but not with Kazys Škirpa, who was asked to wait in another room. The conversation lasted for about 40 minutes. Ribbentrop demanded the return of Klaipėda to Germany and threatened military action. Urbšys relayed the verbal ultimatum to the Lithuanian government. Because the ultimatum was never set down in writing and did not include a formal deadline, some historians have downplayed its importance, describing it as a "set of demands" rather than as an ultimatum. However, it was made clear that force would be used should Lithuania resist, and it was warned not to seek help from other nations. While a clear deadline was not given, Lithuania was told to make a speedy decision and that any clashes or German casualties would inevitably provoke a response from the German military.

Lithuania secretly informed the signatories of the Klaipėda Convention about these demands, since technically Lithuania could not transfer Klaipėda without the approval of the signatories. Italy and Japan supported Germany in the matter, while the United Kingdom and France expressed sympathy for Lithuania but chose not to offer any material assistance. They followed a well-publicized policy of appeasing Hitler. The UK treated the issue in the same way as it had treated the Sudeten Crisis and made no plans to assist Lithuania or the other Baltic States if they were attacked by Germany. The Soviet Union, while supporting Lithuania in principle, did not wish to disrupt its relations with Germany at that point, since it was contemplating a pact with the Nazis. Without any material international support, Lithuania had no choice but to accept the ultimatum. Lithuanian diplomacy characterized the concession as a "necessary evil" that would enable Lithuania to preserve its independence and maintained the hope that it was merely a temporary concession.

== Acceptance ==
At 1:00 a.m. on 23 March 1939, Urbšys and Ribbentrop signed a treaty, effective 22 March 1939, stating that Lithuania was voluntarily transferring the Klaipėda Region to Germany. The treaty comprised five articles:

Article I: The Klaipėda Region, cut off from Germany by the Treaty of Versailles, is reunited with the German Reich, effective today.

Article II: The Klaipėda Region is to be evacuated immediately by Lithuanian military and police forces. The Lithuanian Government will take care that the territory is left in orderly condition through the evacuation.

Both sides will name commissioners, so far as it will prove necessary, who are able to carry out the handing over of administration not held in the hands of autonomous authorities of the Klaipėda Region.

Regulations of the rest of the questions resulting from the exchange of State sovereignty, especially economic and financial questions, questions of officials as well as citizenship, are reserved for special agreements.

Article III: In order to make allowance for her economic needs, a Lithuanian free-port zone will be established for Lithuania in Klaipėda. Details will be expressively regulated in accordance with directions of an enclosure attached to this agreement.

Article IV: In order to strengthen their decision and to safeguard the friendly development of relations between Germany and Lithuania, both sides assume the obligation neither to proceed against the other by force nor to support an attack from a third side against one of the two sides.

Article V: This agreement becomes effective upon signature. In witness, whereof, the plenipotentiaries of both sides sign this treaty, prepared double in double original in the German and in the Lithuanian languages.

Berlin, March 22, 1939

— Lithuania–Germany Treaty as quoted in The New York Times

== Aftermath ==
German warships in the port of Klaipėda the day after the ultimatum was accepted

Before the treaty was signed, German soldiers had already entered the port of Klaipėda. Adolf Hitler, arriving on board the cruiser Deutschland, personally toured the city and gave a short speech. The armada sailing to Klaipėda included the cruiser Admiral Graf Spee, the light cruisers Nürnberg, Leipzig, and Köln, two destroyer squadrons, three torpedo boat flotillas, and one tender flotilla. At the time, the Lithuanian navy had only one warship, the Prezidentas Smetona, a 580-ton converted minesweeper. While the Germans were celebrating the return of the city, European politicians expressed fears that the Free City of Danzig would be Hitler's next target.

President Antanas Smetona's unconditional acceptance of a second ultimatum in the space of a little over one year became a major source of dissatisfaction with his authoritarian rule. The German ultimatum triggered a political crisis; the passive cabinet of Vladas Mironas was replaced by a cabinet headed by General Jonas Černius. For the first time since the 1926 coup d'état, the government included members of the opposition; Leonas Bistras, of the Lithuanian Christian Democratic Party, was named Minister of Education and Jurgis Krikščiūnas, of the Lithuanian Popular Peasants' Union, was named Minister of Agriculture. As other parties were banned, Bistras and Krikščiūnas were officially billed as independent private citizens. Four generals were now members of the cabinet as well. However, even the looming international crisis did not induce Lithuanian politicians to unite, and they continued to engage in petty political disputes.

Industry in the Klaipėda Region (1939)
Industry	Production (in 000's litas)	Production (% of national total)
Peat-cutting	1,272	13.3
Metals and machinery	2,377	10.6
Chemicals	7.747	36.6
Leather and fur	764	4.2
Textiles	28,257	44.2
Timber	20,899	53.9
Paper and printing	20,744	57.6
Foodstuffs	27,250	21.5
Clothing	1,495	6.6
Electricity and gas	4,938	28.6

The loss of its only port to the Baltic Sea was a major blow to the Lithuanian economy. Between 70% and 80% of foreign trade passed through Klaipėda. The region, which represented only about 5% of Lithuania's territory, contained a third of its industry. Lithuania also lost its heavy investments in the port's infrastructure. About 10,000 refugees, mostly Jews, left the region and sought shelter and support from the Lithuanian government. Lithuanians doubted the fate of their country; in March–April, withdrawals of deposits in banks and credit institutions totaled almost 20% of total deposits. After the loss of Klaipėda, Lithuania drifted into the German sphere of influence, especially in terms of trade. At the end of 1939, Germany accounted for 75% of Lithuanian exports and for 86% of its imports.

Germany and the Soviet Union concluded the Molotov–Ribbentrop Pact in 1939, dividing Eastern Europe into their respective spheres of influence. Lithuania was, at first, assigned to Germany. The Nazis went so far as to suggest a German–Lithuanian military alliance against Poland and promised to return the Vilnius Region, but Lithuania held to its policy of strict neutrality. After the invasion of Poland, the German–Soviet Frontier Treaty assigned Lithuania to the Soviet sphere of influence. A Soviet ultimatum in June 1940 was also accepted and saw the country annexed by the Soviet Union.

== Bibliography ==
- Hiden, John; Lane, Thomas (2002) [1992]. The Baltic and the Outbreak of the Second World War (First Paperback ed.). Cambridge University Press. ISBN 0-521-53120-9.
- Eidintas, Alfonsas; Žalys, Vytautas; Senn, Alfred Erich (September 1999). Tuskenis, Edvardas (ed.). Lithuania in European Politics: The Years of the First Republic, 1918–1940 (Paperback ed.). New York: St. Martin's Press. ISBN 0-312-22458-3.
