= Klaipėda Region =

Area of East Prussia

Coordinates: 55°27′N 21°24′E

Klaipėda Region Klaipėdos kraštas (Lithuanian) Memelland/Memelgebiet (German)
- 1919–1923
- Flag Coat of arms

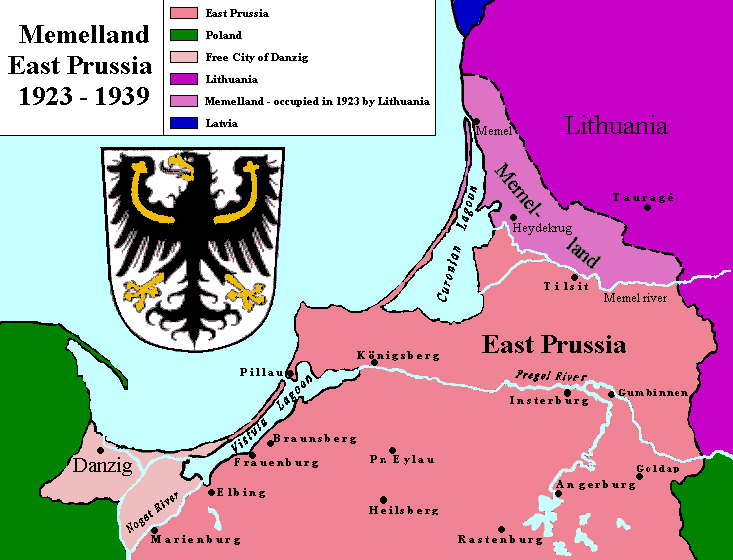
- Historical map of Memelland and the northern part of East Prussia
- Status: Special territory under League of Nations protection
- Capital: Klaipėda
- Common languages: German; Low German; Lithuanian
- Presidents of the Directorate
  - 1920–1921: Arthur Altenberg
  - 1921–1923: Wilhelm Steputat
  - 1923: Erdmann Simoneit
- Legislature: Seimelis
- Historical era: Interwar period
  - Treaty of Versailles: 10 January 1919
  - Klaipėda Revolt: 10–15 January 1923
  - Annexed by Lithuania: 19 January 1923

Area
  - Total: 2,657 km^{2} (1,026 sq mi)
- Currency: Papiermark
Preceded by	Succeeded by
Free State of Prussia	Klaipėda County
- Today part of: Lithuania

The Klaipėda Region (Lithuanian: Klaipėdos kraštas) or Memel Territory (German: Memelland or Memelgebiet) was defined by the 1919 Treaty of Versailles in 1920 and refers to the northernmost part of the German province of East Prussia, when, as Memelland, it was put under the administration of the Entente's Council of Ambassadors. The Memel Territory, together with other areas severed from Germany (the Saar and Danzig), was to remain under the control of the League of Nations until a future date, when the people of those regions would be allowed to vote on whether or not the land would return to Germany. Today, the former Memel Territory is controlled by Lithuania as part of Klaipėda and Tauragė counties.

== Historical overview ==
In 1226, Duke Konrad I of Masovia requested assistance against the Prussians and other Baltic tribes, including the Skalvians who lived along the Neman (Memel) River. In March 1226, Holy Roman Emperor Frederick II issued the Golden Bull of Rimini, which provided that the Teutonic Knights would possess lands taken beyond the Masovian border in exchange for securing Masovia. After uprisings of the Baltic Prussian tribes in 1242 to 1274 failed, the Order conquered many remaining western Balts in Lithuania Minor, including the Skalvians, Nadruvians and Yotvingians. In 1252, the Order constructed Memel Castle where the Dangė river flows into the Neman, at the north end of the Curonian Spit. In 1422, after centuries of conflict, the Order and the Polish–Lithuanian union signed the Treaty of Melno, which defined a border between Prussia and Lithuania. Although Grand Duke Vytautas of Lithuania wanted the border to be coextensive with the Neman River, the treaty border started north of Memelberg and ran southeasterly to the Neman. This border remained until 1918. After the Treaty of Melno was signed, many Lithuanians returned to northeastern Prussia, which became known as Lithuania Minor in the 16th century.

After World War I ended in 1918, the Klaipėda Region was defined as a roughly-triangular wedge, with the northern border being the Treaty of Melno border, the southern border following the Neman River, and on the west abutting the Baltic Sea. In 1923, fearing that the western powers would create a free state, Lithuanians took control of the region and, as part of larger regional negotiations, incorporated the region into the State of Lithuania. In March 1939, Lithuania acquiesced to Nazi demands and transferred the Klaipėda Region to Germany. As World War II came to an end in 1945, the Soviet Union incorporated the region into the Lithuanian SSR. Since 1990, the area of the Klaipėda Region has formed part of the independent Republic of Lithuania, as part of Klaipėda and Tauragė counties. The southern border established by the Treaty of Versailles defines the current international boundary between Lithuania and the Kaliningrad Oblast of the Russian Federation.

== Timeline ==
Timeline with changes of control over the territory
pre-1252	Curonian and Scalovian tribes
1252–1525	Livonian Order and Monastic State of the Teutonic Knights (also Monastic State of Prussia)
1525–1618	Duchy of Prussia, a fief of the Polish–Lithuanian Commonwealth
1618–1657	Duchy of Prussia, a fief of the Polish–Lithuanian Commonwealth, in personal union with Brandenburg
1657–1701	Brandenburg–Prussia, the Duchy of Prussia as a self govering state in personal union with Brandenburg and fief of the Holy Roman Empire
1701–1866	Kingdom of Prussia, outside of both Holy Roman Empire and German Confederation
1866–1871	Kingdom of Prussia, part of the North German Confederation
1871–1918	Kingdom of Prussia, part of the German Empire
1918–1920	Free State of Prussia, part of Weimar Republic
1920–1923	Conference of Ambassadors
1923–1939	Republic of Lithuania
1939–1945	Nazi Germany
1945–1990	Lithuanian SSR, part of the Soviet Union
1990–present	Retroceeded to Republic of Lithuania

== Treaty of Versailles ==
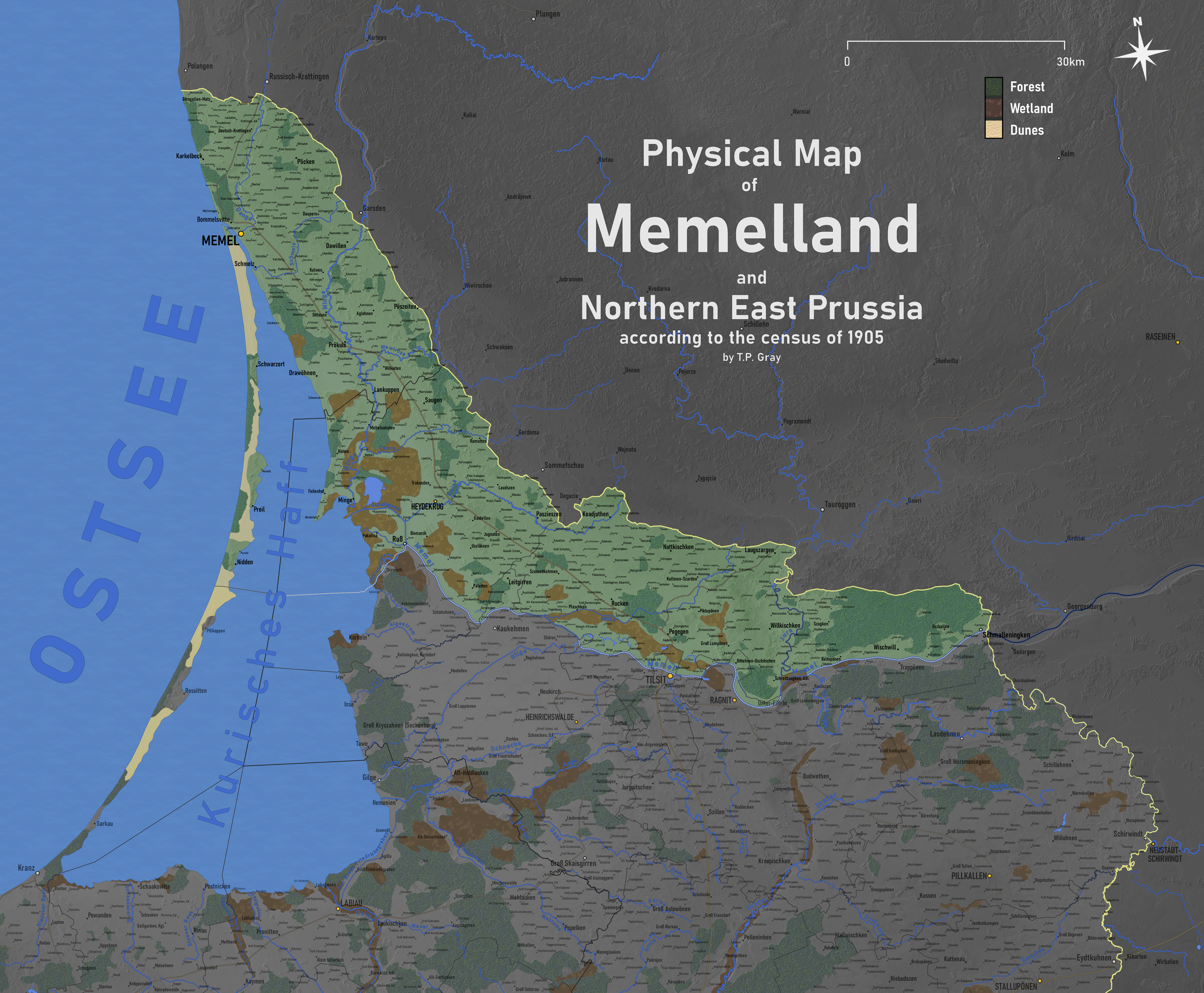
Physical map of the Memelland in 1905

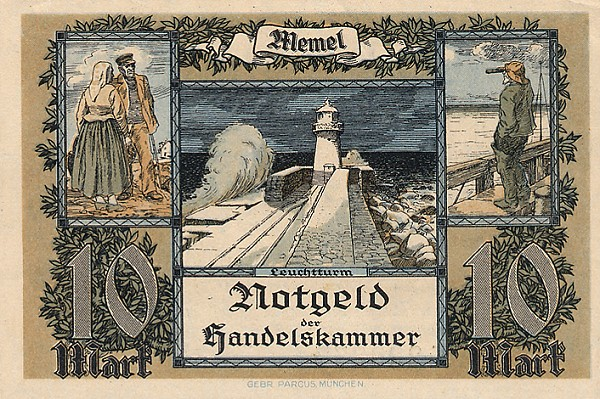
Banknote of emergency money from 1922 issued and used in Memel

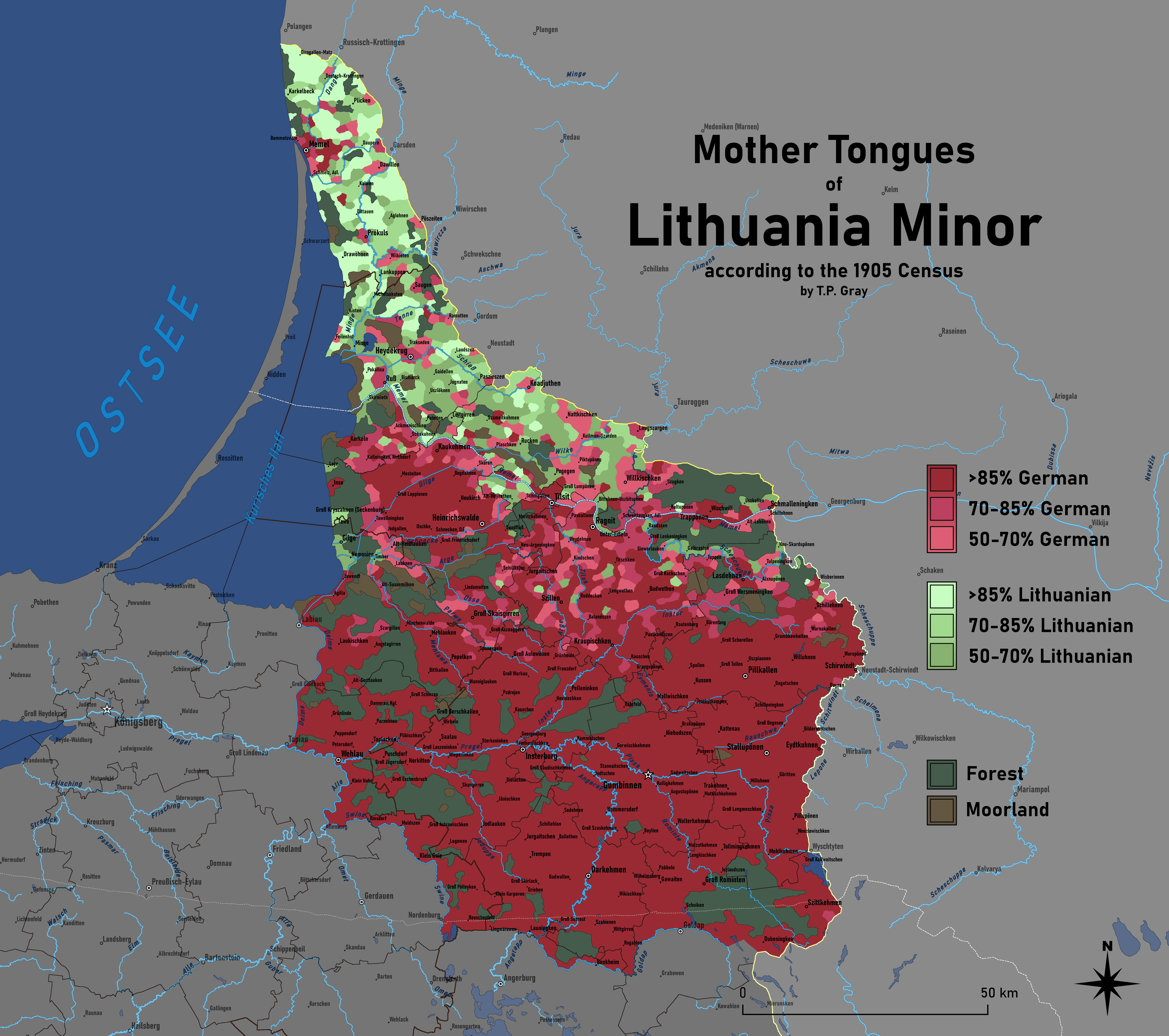
Mother tongues of Lithuania Minor in 1905, showing the distribution of Lithuanian speakers in northern East Prussia prior to World War I

The eastern boundaries of Prussia (from 1871, part of the German Empire), having remained unchanged since the Treaty of Melno in 1422, became a matter of discussion following World War I as the newly-independent states of Poland and Lithuania emerged. The separatist Act of Tilsit was signed by a few pro-Lithuanian-oriented Prussian Lithuanians in 1918 and demanded the unification of Prussian Lithuania with Lithuania proper. It is traditionally viewed by Lithuanians as expressing the desire of Lithuania Minor to unite with Lithuania, but the majority of Prussian Lithuanians did not want to join with Lithuania, and the Prussian Lithuanians, at 26.6% of the population, did not make up a majority of the region.

The division of Prussia was also promoted by Poland's Roman Dmowski in Versailles who acted on the orders of Józef Piłsudski. The purpose was to give the lower part of the Neman River and its delta, which was located in Germany and called the Memel River, to Lithuania, as that would provide her access to the Baltic Sea, and Lithuania itself should be part of Poland. Those ideas were supported by French Prime Minister Georges Clemenceau.

In 1920, according to the Treaty of Versailles, the German area north of the Memel River was given the status of Territoire de Memel under the administration of the Conference of Ambassadors, and French troops were sent for protection. The German delegation at the Paris Peace Conference, under the leadership of Count Ulrich von Brockdorff-Rantzau, immediately protested that decision and stated on 9 May 1919:

[Memellanders], including those whose mother-tongue is Lithuanian, have never desired a separation from Germany [...] they have always proved themselves a loyal constituent part of the German community...moreover, Memel is an entirely German town [...] which has never in its whole history belonged to Lithuania or to Poland.

To that claim, the Allied Powers responded the following:

The Allied and associated Powers reject the suggestion that the cession of the district of Memel conflicts with the principles of nationality. The district in question has always been Lithuanian; the majority of the populace is Lithuanian in origin and in speech and the fact that the city of Memel itself is in large parts German is no justification for maintaining the district under German sovereignty, particularly from the view of the fact that the port of Memel is the only sea outlet for Lithuania.

Following the evacuation of German troops from Memel, the French took over the temporary military administration of the region on 15 February 1920 under the leadership of General Dominique Odry. This was supplemented by a civilian one headed by Gabriel Jean Petisné in 1921. The French administration proved problematic, as it was accused by the Lithuanian population of siding too closely with the pro-German Landes Directorium and subsequently of siding with Polish civilian and military representatives. As a result of that backlash, Odry left his post shortly after coming to Memel and handed the responsibility of the administration over to High Commissioner Gabriel Jean Petisné. During the French administration, the idea of an independent state of Memelland grew in popularity among local inhabitants. The organisation Deutsch-Litauischer Heimatbund (German-Lithuanian homeland federation) promoted the idea of a Freistaat Memelland, which later should return to Germany. It had 30,000 members, both ethnic Germans and Lithuanians, or about 21% of the total population.

== Lithuanian takeover ==
On 9 January 1923, three years after the Versailles Treaty had become effective, Lithuania occupied the territory during the Klaipėda Revolt, mainly by militias that had entered the region from Lithuania. At the same time, France had started the Occupation of the Ruhr in Germany, and the French administration in Memel did not take any significant counteractive measures against the rebels. On 19 January, the territory was annexed by Lithuania, and the fait accompli was eventually confirmed by the Conference of Ambassadors in 1924.

== Autonomous region within Lithuania ==
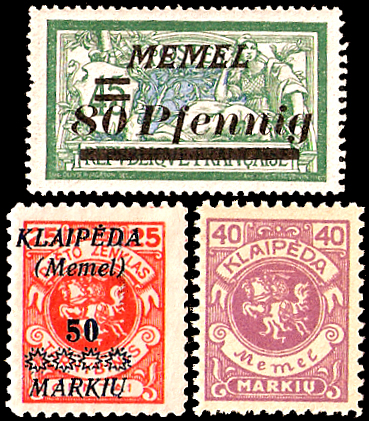
Postage stamps of the Klaipėda Region in use between 1920 and 1925. The upper stamp is French with an overprint in German "MEMEL". The other stamps are Lithuanian, one with an overprint in Lithuanian and in German, the other without. The latter one was issued especially for postal use in the Klaipėda Region.

At the Klaipėda Convention, signed by the Conference of Ambassadors and Lithuania, the area was granted a separate parliament, two official languages, the capacity to raise its own taxes, charge custom duties, and manage its cultural and religious affairs, and was allowed a separate judicial system, separate citizenship, internal control of agriculture and forestry, as well as a separate social security system. The Council of Ambassadors accepted the resulting arrangement and confirmed the autonomy of the region within the Republic of Lithuania. On 8 May 1924, a further Convention on the Klaipėda region confirmed the annexation, and a resulting autonomy agreement was signed in Paris. In the Lithuanian-German Arbitration and Settlement Agreement (Schieds- und Vergleichsvertrag) of 29 January 1928, the Republic of Lithuania and the Weimar Republic agreed "as a sign of the friendly nature of their relations" to conclude, among other items, a border settlement agreement that included the status of the Memel Territory.

Importantly, the annexation gave Lithuania control of a year-round, ice-free Baltic port. Lithuania made full use of Klaipėda's port by modernising and adapting it largely for its agricultural exports. The port reconstruction was certainly one of the larger long-term investment projects enacted by the government of Lithuania in the interwar period.

The inhabitants of the area were not given a choice on the ballot as to whether they wanted to be part of the Lithuanian state or part of Germany. Since the pro-German political parties had an overall majority of more than 80% in all elections to the local parliament (see election statistics below) in the interwar period, there can be little doubt that such a referendum would have been in favour of Germany. In fact, the area had been annexed from Kingdom of Lithuania to the monastic state in the 13th century, and even many Lithuanian-speakers, regarding themselves as East Prussians, declared themselves "Memellanders/Klaipėdiškiai" in the official census (see below for demographic information) and did not want to belong to a Lithuanian national state because of the strong Germanisation in the late 1800s. According to the Lithuanian point of view, Memellanders were viewed as Germanized Lithuanians who should be re-Lithuanised.

There was also a strong denominational difference since about 95% of the inhabitants of Lithuania Minor were Lutherans, and more than 90% of Greater Lithuanians were Catholics. Following the Agreement concerning the Evangelical Church of the Klaipėda Region (German: Abkommen betr. die evangelische Kirche des Memelgebietes) of 23 July 1925, concluded between the Directorate of the Klaipėda Region and the Evangelical Church of the old-Prussian Union, a church of united administration of Lutheran and Reformed congregations, the mostly-Lutheran congregations (and a single Reformed one in Klaipėda) in the Klaipėda Region were disentangled from the Old Prussian Ecclesiastical Province of East Prussia and formed the Regional Synodal Federation of the Memel Territory (Landessynodalverband Memelgebiet) since it ranked an Old Prussian ecclesiastical province of its own. An own consistory in Klaipėda was established in 1927, led by a general superintendent (at first F. Gregor, elected in 1927, succeeded by O. Obereiniger, elected by the regional synod in 1933). The Catholic parishes in the Klaipėda Region belonged to the Bishopric of Ermland until 1926 and were then disentangled to form the new Territorial Prelature of Klaipėda under Prelate Justinas Staugaitis.

The government of Lithuania faced considerable opposition from the region's autonomous institutions, such as the Parliament of the Klaipėda Region. As the years passed, claims were becoming more and more vocal for the reintegration into a resurgent Germany. It was only during the latter period that Lithuania instituted a policy of Lithuanisation. That was met by even more opposition, as religious and regional differences slowly became insurmountable.

After the December 1926 coup d'état, Antanas Smetona came to power. As the status of the Memel Territory was regulated by international treaties, the Memel Territory became an oasis of democracy in Lithuania. Lithuanian intelligentsia often held marriages in Memel/Klaipėda since Memel Territory was the only place in Lithuania that had civil marriage; in the rest of Lithuania, only church marriages were allowed. Thus, Lithuanian opposition to Smetona's regime was also based in Memel Territory.

At the start of the 1930s, leaders and members of pro-Nazi organisations in the region were put on trial by Lithuania "for crimes of terrorism". The 1934–1935 trial of Neumann and Sass in Kaunas can be presented as the first anti-Nazi trial in Europe. Three members of the organisations were sentenced to death, and their leaders were imprisoned. After political and economic pressure from Germany, most of them were later released.

=== Election results for the local parliament ===
The local parliament had 29 seats, one for every 5,000 inhabitants. Men and women over the age of 23 had the right to vote.

See also the results of the January 1919 elections to the Nationalversammlung.

Year	Memeländische Landwirtschaftspartei ("Agricultural Party")	Memeländische Volkspartei ("People's Party")	Sozialdemokratische Partei ("Social Democratic Party")	Arbeiterpartei (Worker's Party)	Communist Party	Others	Lithuanian People's Party
1925	38.1%: 11 seats	36.9%: 11 seats	16.0%: 5 seats	—	—	Others 9.0%: 2 seats	—
1927	33.6%: 10 seats	32.7%: 10 seats	10.1%: 3 seats	—	7.2%: 2 seats	—	13.6%: 4 seats
1930	31.8%: 10 seats	27.6%: 8 seats	13.8%: 4 seats	4.2%: 2 seats	—	—	22.7%: 5 seats
1932	37.1%: 11 seats	27.2%: 8 seats	7.8%: 2 seats	8.2%: 3 seats	—	—	19.7%: 5 seats
	Unified German Election List					Greater Lithuania Parties	
1935	81.2%: 24 seats					18.8%: 5 seats	
1938	87.2%: 25 seats					12.8%: 4 seats	

== Demographics ==
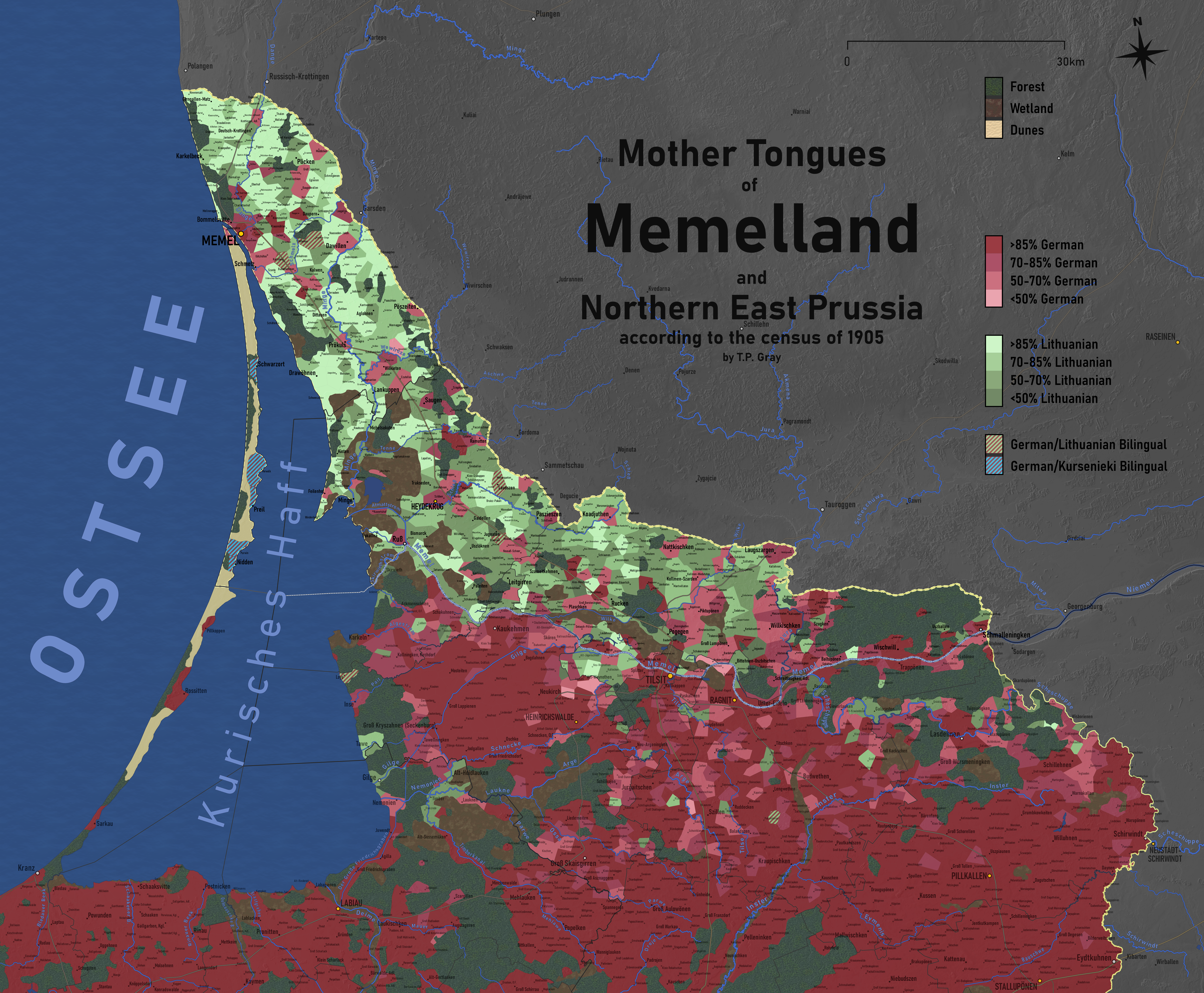
Mother tongues and religious confessions of Memelland in 1905

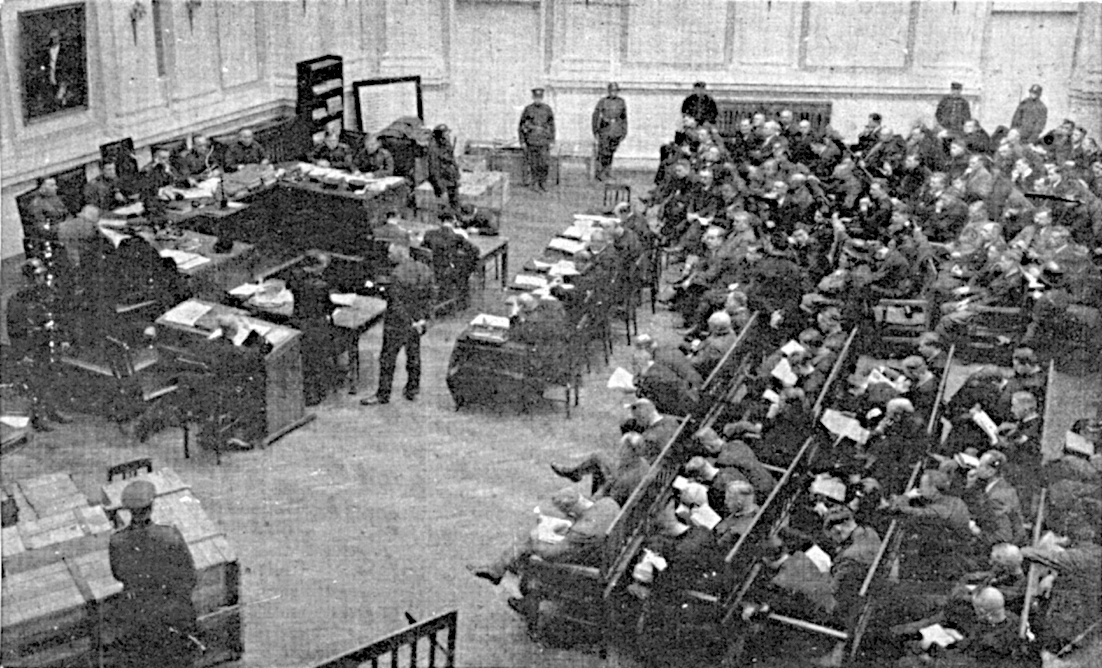
The first trial of the Nazis in Europe, which took place in Kaunas in 1935. The accused claimed that the Klaipėda Region should be part of Germany, not Lithuania, and spread propaganda, prepared for an armed uprising.

A Lithuanian census carried out in the region in 1925 found its total population was 141,000. Declared language was used to classify the inhabitants, and on this basis 43.5% were German, 27.6% were Lithuanian, and 25.2% were "Klaipėdan" (Memeländisch). Other sources give the interwar ethnic composition as 41.9% German, 27.1% Memeländisch, and 26.6% Lithuanian.

Population	German	Memelandish	Lithuanian	other	Religion	Ref.
141,645	41.9%	27.1%	26.6%	4.4%	95% Evangelical Christians	
141,645 (1930)	45.2%	24.2% (1925)	26.5%	—	Evangelical Lutheran 95%, Roman Catholic (1925)	

Overall, Prussian Lithuanians were more rural than Germans; the number of Lithuanian speakers in the city of Klaipėda itself increased over time due to urbanization and migration from villages into cities and later also from remaining Lithuania (in the city of Klaipėda, Lithuanian-speaking people made up 21.5% in 1912, 32.6% in 1925, and 38.7% in 1932*). Foreign citizens might include some Germans who opted for German citizenship instead of Lithuanian although the German government pressured local Germans to take Lithuanian citizenship so that the German presence would remain. There were more Lithuanian-speakers in the north of the region (Klaipėdos apskritis and Šilutės apskritis) than in the south (Pagėgių apskritis). Other locals included people of other nationalities who had citizenship in Lithuania, such as Jews.

In the 1930s, Aukštujų Šimonių likimas (The Fate of Šimoniai from Aukštujai), a novel by local author Ieva Simonaitytė was published, illustrating the centuries-old German–Lithuanian relations in the region whilst being based on family history.

The authoritarian regime of Smetona enforced a policy of discrimination and Lithuanisation and sent administrators from Lithuania, and German teachers, officials, and priests were fired from jobs. Local inhabitants — both Germans and Prussian Lithuanians — were not accepted for state service in the Memel Territory. People were sent from Kaunas instead.

Until 1938, no governor was appointed from the local Prussian Lithuanians. That policy led the Prussian Lithuanian intelligentsia and some local Germans to organise a society in 1934 to oppose Lithuanian rule. The group was soon dismantled.

Election results in Memel Territory were irritating for the authoritarian Smetona regime, and it attempted to "colonise" Memel Territory with Lithuanians. The Lithuanian settlements Jakai and Smeltė were built. The number of newcomers increased from 5,000 in 1926 to 30,000 in 1939.

Lithuania introduced a hardline Lithuanisation campaign, which led to even deeper antagonism between local Prussian Lithuanians, Memellanders, Germans and newcomers.

== German ultimatum ==
President Smetona Avenue was renamed Adolf Hitler Street in 1939

By late 1938, Lithuania had lost control of the situation in the Territory. In the early hours of 23 March 1939, after an oral ultimatum had caused a Lithuanian delegation to travel to Berlin, the Lithuanian Minister of Foreign Affairs Juozas Urbšys and his German counterpart Joachim von Ribbentrop signed the Treaty of the Cession of the Memel Territory to Germany in exchange for a Lithuanian Free Zone for 99 years in the port of Memel that would use the facilities erected in previous years.

Hitler had anticipated that aboard a Kriegsmarine naval ship and at dawn sailed into Memel to celebrate the return heim ins Reich of the Memelland. That proved to be the last of a series of bloodless annexations of territories separated from Germany by the Treaty of Versailles, which had been perceived by many Germans as a humiliation. German forces seized the territory even before the official Lithuanian ratification. The United Kingdom and France, after the revolt of 1923, took no action. It was under those conditions that the Seimas was forced to approve the treaty in the hope that Germany would not press any other territorial demands upon Lithuania.

Still, the reunion with Germany was welcomed by the majority of the population, both Germans and Memellanders.

According to the treaty, the citizens of the Memel Territory were allowed to choose their citizenship: either German or Lithuanian, 303 people, or counting family members, 585, asked for Lithuanian citizenship, but only 20 requests were granted. Another term stated that persons who had settled in the Memel Territory during the occupation period from 1923 to 1939 should emigrate. About 8,900 Lithuanians did so. At the same time, Germany expelled about 1,300 local Memel and Lithuanian Jews and about 40 Prussian Lithuanians.

Daily life and identity tensions in the region during the 1930s were also documented in the memoirs of local educator Erikas Pempė, published posthumously as A Reluctant Citizen (2017).

== Politics ==
=== Governors ===
High Commissioners

- Dominique Joseph Odry, France (15 February 1920 – 1 May 1921)
- Gabriel Jean Petisné, France (1 May 1921 – 19 February 1923)

Plenipotentiaries

- Jonas Polovinskas-Budrys, Lithuania (acting; 19 February 1923 – 24 February 1923)
- Antanas Smetona, Lithuania (24 February 1923 – 27 October 1924)

Governors

- Jonas Polovinskas-Budrys (27 October 1924 – 8 November 1925)
- Jonas Žilius (8 November 1925 – 1 August 1926)
- Karolis Žalkauskas (1 August 1926 – 1 November 1927)
- Antanas Merkys (1 November 1927 – 19 May 1932)
- Vytautas Jonas Gylys (19 May 1932 – 25 November 1933)
- Jonas Navakas (25 November 1933 – 5 February 1935)
- Vladas Kurkauskas (5 February 1935 – 15 October 1936)
- Jurgis Kubilius (15 October 1936 – 12 December 1938)
- Viktoras Gailius (12 December 1938 – 22 March 1939)

Transitional Commissioner for the Integration of Memelland

- Erich Koch (23 March 1939 – 30 April 1939)

== World War II and after ==
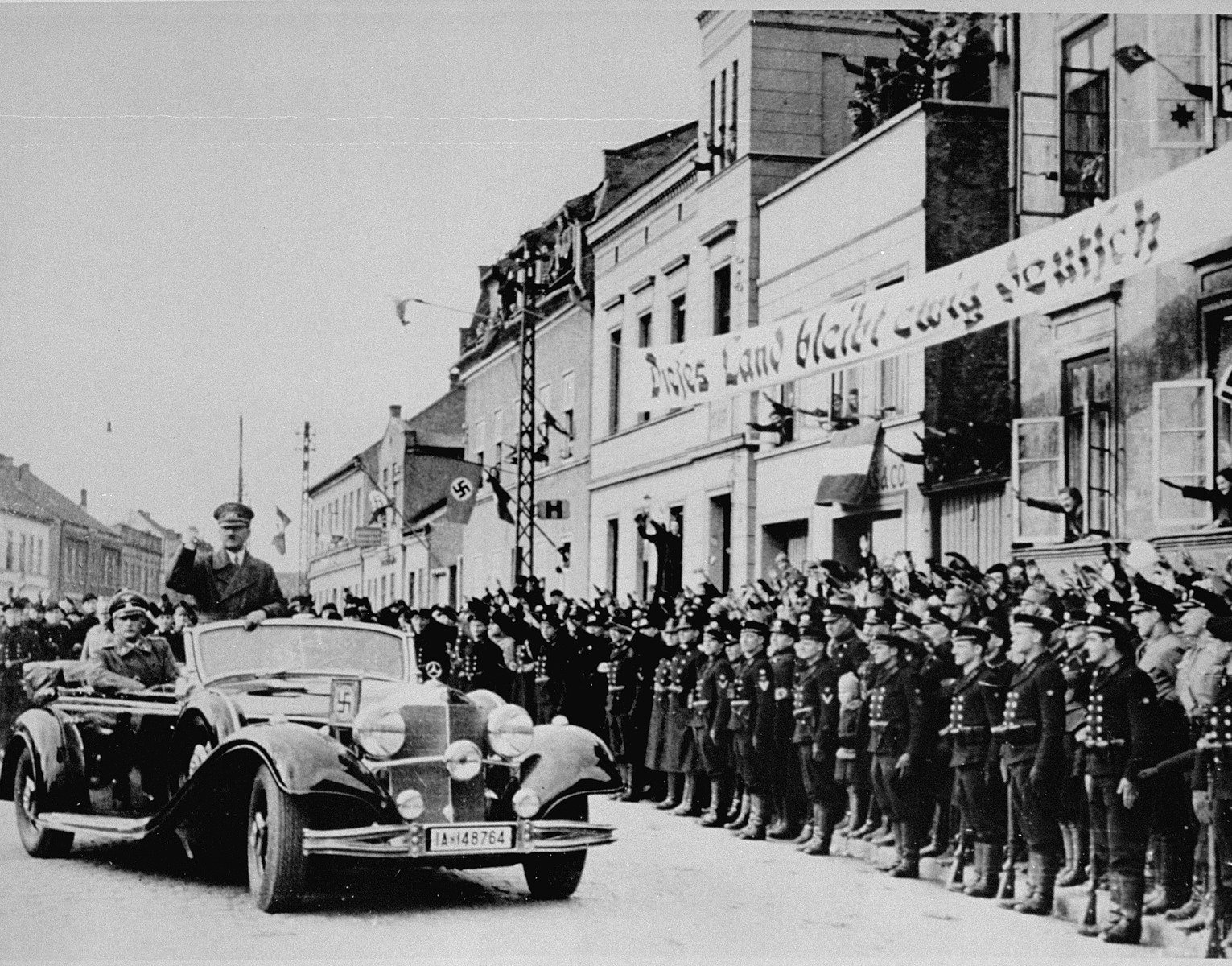
Adolf Hitler in Memel in March 1939

After Nazi Germany took over the area in 1939, many Lithuanians and their organizations began leaving Memel and the surrounding area. Memel was quickly turned into a fortified naval base by the Germans. After the failure of the German invasion of the Soviet Union, the fate of East Prussia and Memel was sealed. By October 1944, the inhabitants of the area, without ethnic distinction, had to make a decision whether to stay or leave. Nearly all of the population was evacuated from the approaching Red Army, but the city itself was defended by the German Army during the Battle of Memel until 28 January 1945. After its capture, only six people were found in the city.

At the end of the war, the majority of the inhabitants had fled to the West to settle in Germany. Still, in 1945–1946, there were around 35,000 local inhabitants, both Prussian Lithuanians and Germans. The government of the Lithuanian SSR sent agitators into the displaced persons camps to make promises to former inhabitants that they could return and their property would be restored. From 1945 to 1950, about 8,000 persons were repatriated. Bilingual Lithuanian-German returners were viewed as Germans.

The few remaining ethnic Germans were then forcibly expelled, with most opting to flee to what would become West Germany. People who remained in the former Memel territory were dismissed from their jobs. Families of notable local Lithuanians, who had opposed German parties before the war, were deported to Siberia. In 1951, the Lithuanian SSR expelled 3,500 people from the former Memel Territory to East Germany. In 1958, when emigration was allowed, the majority of the surviving population, both Germans and Prussian Lithuanians, emigrated to West Germany; this event was called a repatriation of Germans by the Lithuanian SSR. Today, these formerly Lutheran territories are mostly inhabited by Lithuanians who are Catholic and by Orthodox Russians. However, the minority Prussian Lithuanian Protestants historically were concentrated in these regions, and some remain to this day. Only a few thousand are left. Their continued emigration is facilitated by the fact that they are considered German citizens by the Federal Republic of Germany. No property restoration was performed by the Republic of Lithuania for owners prior to 1945.

Although maintaining that the Memel Territory in 1939 was re-annexed by Germany and acknowledging that Lithuania itself was occupied in 1940 by the Soviet Union, Lithuania, after regaining independence on 11 March 1990, did not restore autonomy to the Memel Territory.

== See also ==
- Areas annexed by Nazi Germany
- Memel Agricultural Party
- Klaipėda town
- The Lithuanian–Belorussian Soviet Socialist Republic (A.K.A. Litbel)
- The Republic of Central Lithuania
- The 1922 Republic of Central Lithuania general election
