= National Council of Lithuania Minor =

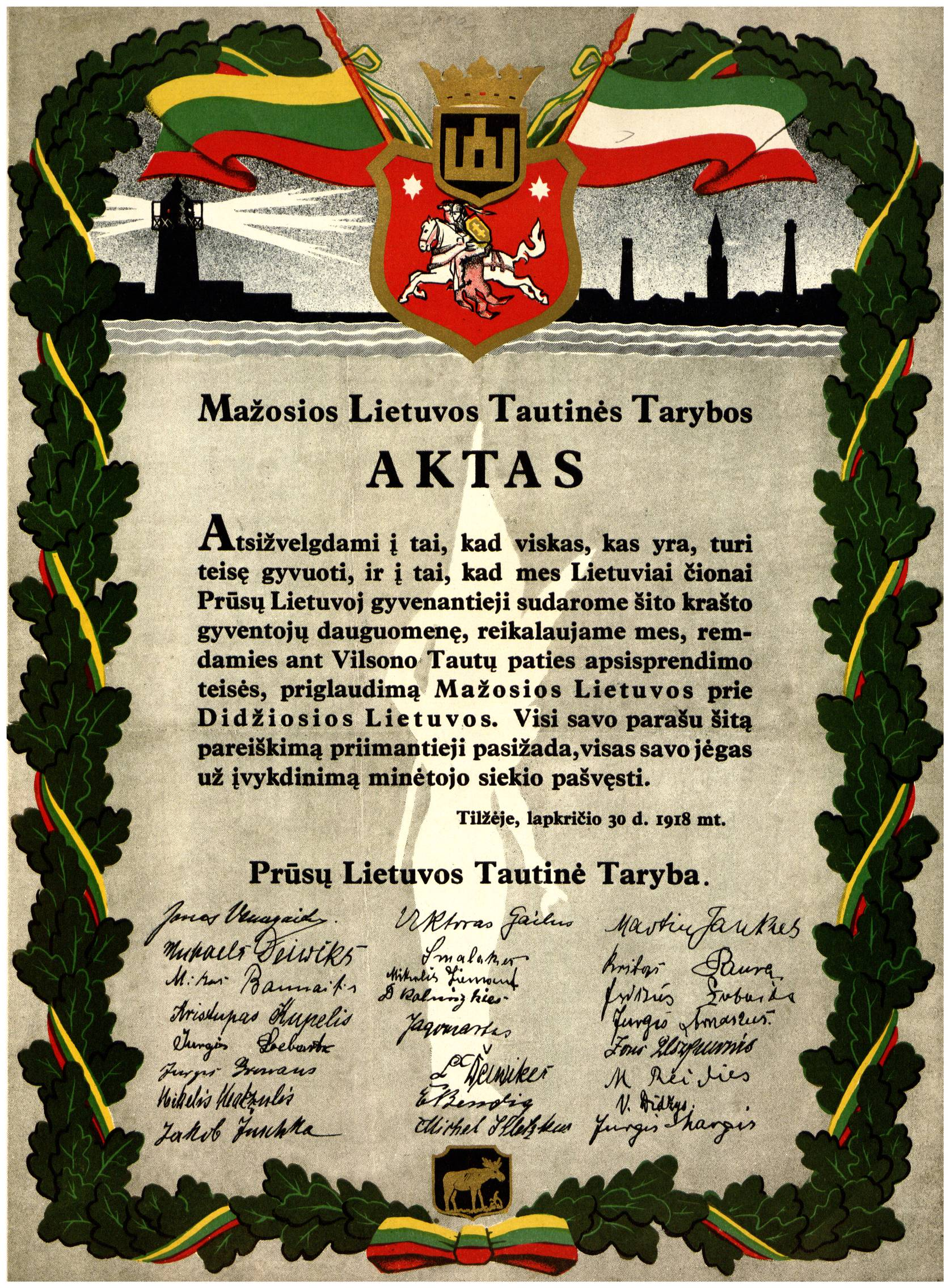
1936 poster with the Act of Tilsit

The National Council of Lithuania Minor (Lithuanian: Mažosios Lietuvos tautinė taryba or Prūsų Lietuvos tautinė taryba) was a council of Prussian Lithuanians established on 16 November 1918 and active until 1924. Citing the right of self-determination, the council supported the unification of Lithuania Minor (then part of East Prussia) with Lithuania Proper.

The National Council took symbolic measures to show its support for the unification – it adopted the Act of Tilsit on 30 November 1918 and four of its members were coopted into the Council of Lithuania on 20 March 1920. Members of the National Council lobbied at the Paris Peace Conference and the Conference of Ambassadors for the unification with Lithuania, and joined the Supreme Committee for the Salvation of Lithuania Minor which facilitated the Klaipėda Revolt in January 1923. The National Council became inactive after Klaipėda Region was incorporated as an autonomous region of Lithuania.

== Establishment ==
East Prussia (part of the German Empire) had a large Lithuanian-speaking population of Prussian Lithuanians. Lithuania declared independence on 16 February 1918. As Germany surrendered in World War I and became engulfed in a revolution, several Prussian Lithuanians, including Martynas Jankus, Erdmonas Simonaitis, and Jonas Vanagaitis, organized a committee of activists. On 16 November 1918, they published 100,000 copies (Note: The number of 100,000 copies was provided in memoirs of Jonas Vanagaitis who popularized the Act of Tilsit in the late 1930s.) of a Lithuanian and German proclamation in the Gothic script Lietuvininkai! Pabuskit! Klausykit! Padabokit! (Lithuanians! Wake up! Listen! Look!) in Tilsit. It declared that Lithuanians and Prussian Lithuanians were one nation and thus should unite. The proclamation was also published in Lietuwißka Ceitunga and Konservatyvų draugystės laiškas.

On 16 November 1918, the activists' committee convened a conference of representatives of Prussian Lithuanians in Tilsit. The conference established the National Council of Prussian Lithuanian which was quickly renamed to the National Council of Lithuania Minor. Initially, the council had 15 members. While they were not elected, an attempt was made to represent different districts of East Prussia. The conference elected three-member presidium: chairman Vilius Gaigalaitis, Erdmonas Simonaitis, and Jonas Vanagaitis. Gaigalaitis did not attend the meeting but agreed to become chairman on the telephone. Ten days later, due to political backlash, he refused chairman's position via an article published in the daily German newspaper Königsberger Allgemeine Zeitung. It was decided not to elect a new chairman and the National Council was led by its presidium. However, a few weeks later, Gaigalaitis became chairman of the National Council, but he faced pressure from the German police and fled to Kaunas, the temporary capital of Lithuania, in July 1919.

Later, the council grew to 53 members. Other members included Viktoras Gailius, Martynas Jankus, Vidūnas, Kristupas Lekšas, and Adomas Brakas.

To promote the unification, the National Council organized local clubs in Tilsit, Klaipėda, and Insterburg. Its members also published pro-Lithuanian newspapers – daily Prūsų lietuvių balsas in Lithuanian and Litauische Warte in German. The National Council received some financial support from Lithuania, but its main revenue was from consular services issuing visas to Lithuania.

== Pre-Versailles ==
on 30 November 1918, the council adopted the Act of Tilsit that called for the unification of Lithuania Minor and Lithuania Proper into a single independent Lithuanian state. It was signed by 24 members of the council. The act was not published in either Lithuanian or Prussian press and was virtually unknown in interwar Lithuania. It gain political relevance after World War II and became to symbolize Lithuanian claims to Lithuania Minor.

Opportunistic Jurgis Aukštuolaitis attempted to act in the name of the National Council and titled himself as its chairman. In January 1919, together with Vanagaitis, he personally delivered a protest letter in the name of the National Council to a French captain in Danzig. It was much more anti-German than the Act of Tilsit. The captain received five copies of the text which he was to send to the governments of the United States, United Kingdom, France, Italy as well as the Danish daily København. The letter was published in the Danish press and from there in the German press.

The National Council lobbied for the unification with Lithuania Proper. On 8 April 1919, the council delivered a memorandum to Georges Clemenceau, chairman of the Paris Peace Conference, which demanded that Prussian Lithuanian-inhabited districts were attached to Lithuania. These districts reached Labiau (Polessk), Insterburg (Chernyakhovsk), Gumbinnen (Gusev), Darkehmen (Ozyorsk), and Gołdap. The territory measured about 10,000 square kilometres (3,900 sq mi) and had a population of about 500,000. However, the Treaty of Versailles, signed on 28 June 1919, detached only the Klaipėda Region north of the Neman River but placed it as a mandate of the League of Nations administered by the French.

== Council of Lithuania ==
On 10 February 1920, the Council of Lithuania sent Jokūbas Šernas to the National Council of Lithuania Minor in Klaipėda. The official handover of the Klaipėda Region to the French administration under General Dominique Joseph Odry took place on 15 February 1920. The following day, Šernas brought three representatives of Prussian Lithuanians to Kaunas for the official celebration of the 2nd anniversary of the Act of Independence of Lithuania. However, the representatives hesitated joining the Council of Lithuania as they wanted assurances of religious freedom. Šernas and Petras Klimas then travelled to Klaipėda to negotiate with the National Council.

On 21 February 1920, the National Council adopted a resolution which demanded that Lithuania take over administration of region's infrastructure (import duty posts, region's railway, postal service, telephone and telegraph) as well as to allow Lithuania free access to the port of Klaipėda and the Neman River. As a result of these efforts, four members of the National Council (Vilius Gaigalaitis, Martynas Jankus, Kristupas Lekšas, Jurgis Strėkis) were coopted to the Council of Lithuania on 20 March 1920. The day was solemnly celebrated as a symbolic unification of Lithuania Minor with Lithuania. However, it was largely a symbolic gesture as the Council of Lithuania convened only once before it was replaced by the Constituent Assembly of Lithuania in May 1920.

== French administration ==
After Versailles, the National Council moved from Tilsit (which remained in East Prussia) to Klaipėda and continued to advocate for the unification of the Klaipėda Region with Lithuania.

Two members of the National Council, Erdmonas Simonaitis and Mikelis Reidys, were co-opted to the Directorate of the Klaipėda Region on 12 March 1920. Odry resigned on 1 May 1921, leaving Gabriel Jean Petisné the highest-ranking official in the region. He appointed a new Directorate, presided by the pro-German Prussian Lithuanian Wilhelm Steputat. Petisné and the Directorate generally held anti-Lithuanian attitudes and supported turning the region into a free city, similar to the Free City of Danzig. In February 1922, Simonaitis resigned in protest of such policies.

== Klaipėda Revolt ==
On 3–4 November 1922, representatives of the National Council – including Vilius Gaigalaitis, Erdmonas Simonaitis, Jokūbas Stikliorius, and Jonas Labrencas – presented the Lithuanian case to the Conference of Ambassadors. They argued that the Klaipėda Region should become an autonomous region of Lithuania. They were opposed by German representatives who argued that the region should remain a protectorate and that the port should be internationalized. Lithuanians felt that the diplomatic decisions would not be in their favor and this became the impetus for Lithuania to organize the Klaipėda Revolt and take Klaipėda Region by force.

In late 1922, Lithuanian activists were sent to various towns and villages to deliver patriotic speeches and organize a number of pro-Lithuanian Committees for the Salvation of Lithuania Minor. On 18 December 1922, the Supreme Committee for the Salvation of Lithuania Minor (SCSLM), made up of the members of the National Council and chaired by Martynas Jankus, was established in Klaipėda to unite all these committees. It was to lead the revolt and later organize a pro-Lithuanian regime in the region.

The revolt was successful. The Klaipėda Convention was signed in May 1924 and Klaipėda Region became an autonomous region of Lithuania. Since the National Council achieved its desired results, it ceased activities in 1924.

== Bibliography ==
- Aleknavičius, Bernardas (22 January – 11 February 2004). "Nors nuritintas akmuo..." Mokslo Lietuva (in Lithuanian). 2 (292). ISSN 1392-7191.
- Andrukaitienė, Irena (26 June 2018). "Gyvenimas vardan Lietuvos" (in Lithuanian). Voruta.
- Atvira Klaipėda (11 December 2019). "Tilžės aktas: kam jis buvo naudingas?" (in Lithuanian).
- Čepėnas, Pranas (1986). Naujųjų laikų Lietuvos istorija (in Lithuanian). Vol. II. Chicago: Dr. Kazio Griniaus Fondas. OCLC 3220435.
- Eidintas, Alfonsas; Žalys, Vytautas; Senn, Alfred Erich (1999). Lithuania in European Politics: The Years of the First Republic, 1918–1940 (Paperback ed.). New York: St. Martin's Press. ISBN 0-312-22458-3.
- Gliožaitis, Algirdas Antanas (2003). "Klaipėdos kraštas". Mažosios Lietuvos enciklopedija (in Lithuanian). Vol. 2. Vilnius: Mokslo ir enciklopedijų leidybos institutas. ISBN 5-420-01470-X.
- Jurgėla, Petras (1990) [1935]. Sparnuoti lietuviai Darius ir Girėnas (in Lithuanian). Vilnius: Lietuvos žurnalistų sąjunga. OCLC 23442034.
- Kaunas, Domas (1998). "Gyvenimas vardan tikėjimo ir lietuvybės: Viliaus Gaigalaičio būties ženklai". Atsiminimai. By Gaigalaitis, Vilius. Kaukienė, Audronė (ed.). (in Lithuanian). Klaipėda: Mažosios Lietuvos Fondas, Klaipėdos Universiteto leidykla. ISBN 9986-505-77-1.
- Maksimaitis, Mindaugas (2011). Mažoji konstituanta: Lietuvos taryba atkuriant valstybingumą (in Lithuanian). Justitia. ISBN 978-9955-616-65-8.
- Matulevičius, Algirdas (21 December 2018). "Tilžės aktas – Mažosios Lietuvos nepriklausomybės deklaracija. Šimtmečiui paminėti: 1918–2018". Mokslo Lietuva (in Lithuanian). 22 (621). ISSN 1392-7191.
- Matulevičius, Algirdas (31 May 2021) [2018]. "Prūsų Lietuvos tautinė komisija". Visuotinė lietuvių enciklopedija (in Lithuanian). Mokslo ir enciklopedijų leidybos centras.
- "Mažosios Lietuvos tautinė taryba". Mažosios Lietuvos enciklopedija (in Lithuanian). Vol. 2. Vilnius: Mokslo ir enciklopedijų leidybos institutas. 2003. pp. 808–809. ISBN 5-420-01470-X.
- Pocytė, Silva (2023). "Prūsijos lietuviai ir Lietuvos nepriklausomybės kovos 1919 m. pirmoje pusėje" (PDF). Karo archyvas (in Lithuanian). XXXVIII: 73–107. ISSN 2424-6123.
- Selenis, Valdas (2022). Nepriklausomybės akto signataras Jokūbas Šernas. Vilnius: Lietuvos nacionalinis muziejus. ISBN 978-609-478-058-5.
- Safronovas, Vasilijus (2008). "Tilžės akto mįslės" (PDF). Kultūros barai (in Lithuanian). 11: 80–85. ISSN 0134-3106.
- Šilas, Vytautas (2003). "Klaipėdos krašto sukilimas". Mažosios Lietuvos enciklopedija (in Lithuanian). Vol. 2. Vilnius: Mokslo ir enciklopedijų leidybos institutas. ISBN 5-420-01470-X.
- Vainorius, Martynas (27 February 2022). "Aktyvių mažlietuvių veikla: norėjo daugiau pinigų, bet ne kontrolės". Atvira Klaipėda (in Lithuanian).
- Vasiliauskas, Antanas (1937). "Žemaičių batalionas". Karo archyvas (in Lithuanian). 8: 211–244.
- Žostautaitė, Petronėlė (1992). Klaipėdos kraštas: 1923–1939 (in Lithuanian). Mokslas. ISBN 978-5-420-00724-2.
