= Jurgis Aukštuolaitis =

Lithuanian political activist

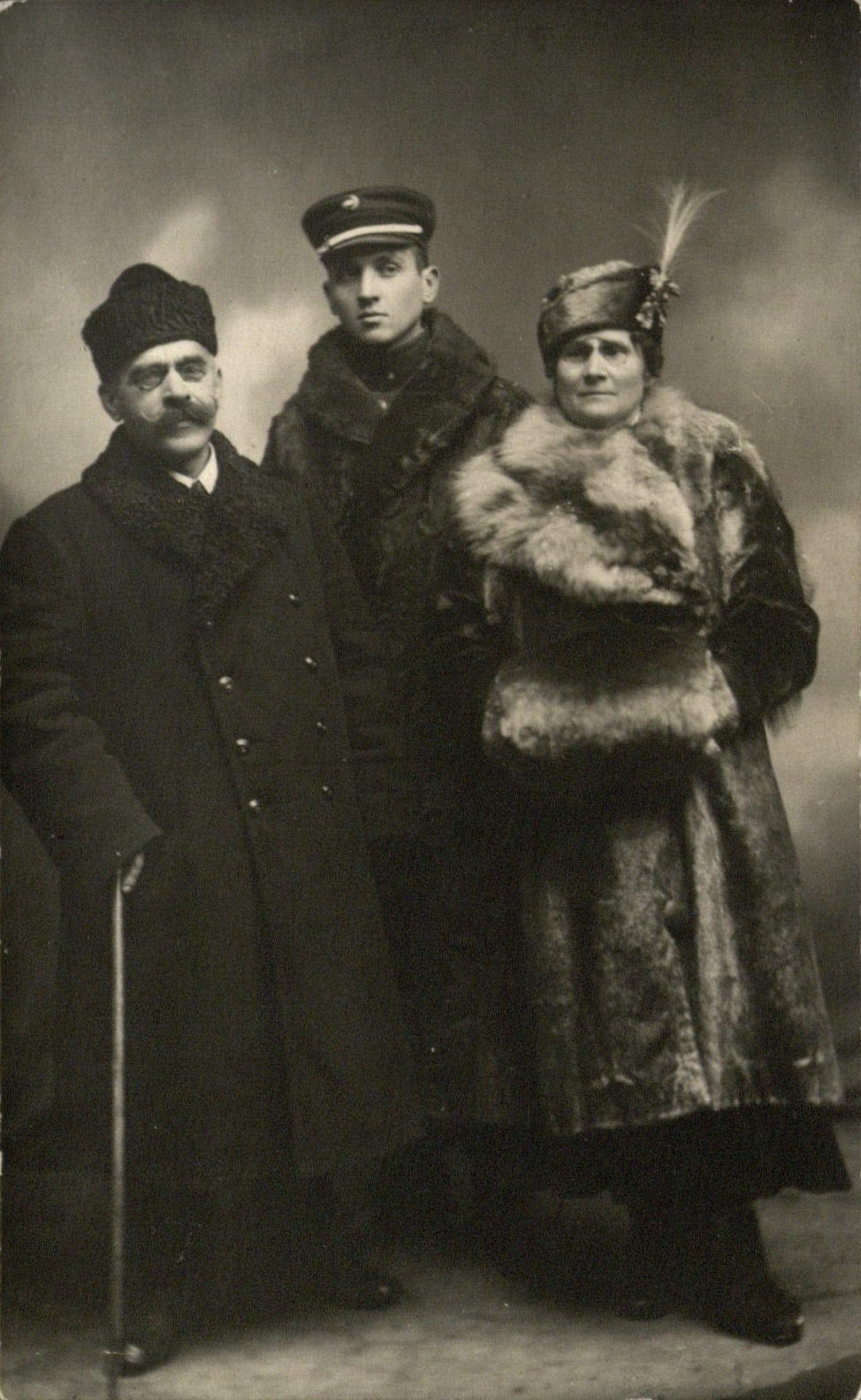
Jurgis Aukštuolaitis with wife and son in 1914–1915

Jurgis Aukštuolaitis (birth/death dates unknown) was a controversial and opportunistic Lithuanian activist best known for his role in organizing the attempted coup against the Lithuanian government in August–September 1919.

Born to a family of a Prussian Lithuanian fisherman, Aukštuolaitis attended a missionary school in Berlin. During World War I, he served in the Imperial German Army. After the Armistice of 11 November 1918, he briefly lead the German soldiers' council (Soldatenrat) in Vilnius. At the start of the Lithuanian–Soviet War, the Lithuanian government sent him to organize a battalion, known as the Samogitian Battalion, in Tauragė. He managed to recruit about 300 men, but frequently acted without approval of the government. In particular, he conspired with Vincas Grigaliūnas-Glovackis, commander of the 2nd Infantry Regiment, to join their forces with the Latvians and take control of Samogitia. He was arrested on 7 March 1919, but soon released due to a change in the cabinet of ministers.

He continued to work at the Lithuanian Ministry of Defence until July 1919. At the same time, he conspired with the Polish Military Organisation to overthrow the government of Prime Minister Mykolas Sleževičius and replace it by a pro-Polish cabinet. Aukštuolaitis was slated to become second-in-command to General Silvestras Žukauskas, the planned military dictator of the new Lithuanian government. However, the coup was discovered and Aukštuolaitis escaped to Vilnius and later to Klaipėda.

== Biography ==
=== Early life ===
According to the memoirs of Jonas Vanagaitis, Aukštuolaitis was born in Nemonien (now Golovkino in the Kaliningrad Oblast) on the shores of the Curonian Lagoon in East Prussia. His father was a fisherman.

In 1904–1905, he was a member of a Lithuanian society in Berlin. This society received funds from Felicija Bortkevičienė, purchased weapons, and smuggled them to activists in Lithuania who supported the Russian Revolution of 1905. Aukštuolaitis created intrigues and threatened to turn other members to the German police.

There is some evidence that Aukštuolaitis attended bookkeeping and stenography courses in Berlin. In 1911, he attended a missionary school in Berlin but was expelled. During World War I, he served in the Imperial German Army. He moved to Vilnius and became a translator and censor of the Lithuanian press for the Ober Ost.

=== Samogitian Battalion ===
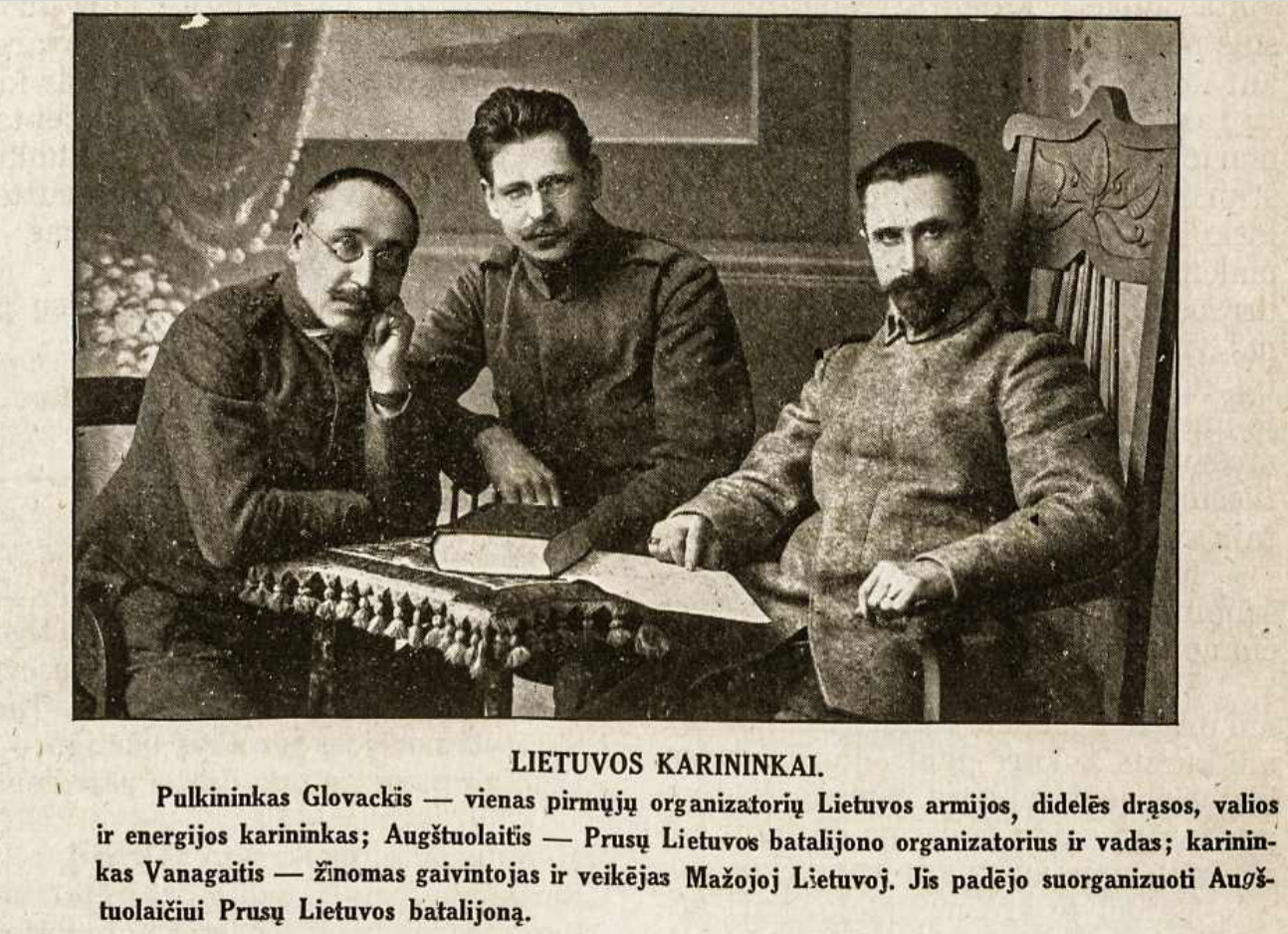
Jurgis Aukštuolaitis (middle) with Vincas Grigaliūnas-Glovackis and Jonas Vanagaitis

After the Armistice of 11 November 1918, he became the chairman of a German soldiers' council (Soldatenrat) in Vilnius. According to memoirs of Bernardas Kodatis, Aukštuolaitis attempted to take control of Vilnius. When it failed, he resigned from the German Army and joined the Lithuanian forces. According to memoirs of general Mykolas Velykis, Aukštuolaitis attempted to proclaim himself the commander of the newly formed Lithuanian Army when general Kyprian Kandratovich decided to retreat to Grodno and was removed from the Lithuanian military.

At the start of the Lithuanian–Soviet War, the Lithuanian government hastily organized defence. While the minister of defence Mykolas Velykis mistrusted Aukštuolaitis, the ministry hired Aukštuolaitis on 4 January 1919 as an officer of special affairs and two days later officially tasked him with the organization of a defensive battalion of Prussian Lithuanians and Samogitians in Tauragė. The Lithuanian government initially envisioned Aukštuolaitis as a procurement agent, while the men would be commanded by officer Jurgis Kubilius.

Aukštuolaitis arrived to Tilsit and established contacts with various Lithuanian activists, including Martynas Jankus, Erdmonas Simonaitis, Jonas Vanagaitis. From the very start, he signed various documents as commander of the unit, though he was officially appointed commander of the battalion only on 4 February 1919. Aukštuolaitis also claimed to organize a regiment, not a battalion. He started recruiting men and purchasing weapons and supplies. In early March, the battalion had 288 men.

Aukštuolaitis started meddling in politics. He personally delivered a protest letter in the name of the National Council of Lithuania Minor to a French captain in Danzig that called for a unification of the Lithuania Minor with Lithuania. In this letter, Aukštuolaitis signed as the chairman of the National Council and as the commander of the battalion even though at the time he was neither.

Aukštuolaitis issued various orders, particularly on martial law and mobilization, without approval or consultation of the Lithuanian government. Aukštuolaitis also planned various military actions without authorization. In particular, he conspired with Vincas Grigaliūnas-Glovackis, commander of the 2nd Infantry Regiment, to join their forces with the Latvians and take control of Samogitia. Both Aukštuolaitis and Glovackis were arrested on 7 March 1919. However, within a few days, the government of Prime Minister Mykolas Sleževičius resigned and minister Velykis was replaced by Antanas Merkys. The investigation was dropped and Aukštuolaitis was released. The battalion was officially disbanded on 25 March 1919.

=== Polish coup ===
Aukštuolaitis continued to be employed by the Ministry of Defence, but was dismissed on 5 July 1919.

In summer 1919, he was recruited by the Polish Military Organisation to aid in organizing a coup against the government of Prime Minister Mykolas Sleževičius. On 20–22 August 1919, Polish diplomat Leon Wasilewski and officer Tadeusz Kasprzycki together with Stanisław Narutowicz and Aukštuolaitis planned out the coup details. During the coup, scheduled for the night from 28 to 29 August, the rebels were to capture Kaunas and hold it until the arrival of the Polish regular units invited to protect the city. The Lithuanian government was to be deposed and replaced by a pro-Polish cabinet. General Silvestras Žukauskas was to be installed as a military dictator of the new Lithuanian government, with Aukštuolaitis as his second-in-command and Stanisław Narutowicz as the head of the civilian government. Aukštuolaitis was given 800,000 and promised another 300,000 German marks to finance the coup. Narutowicz and Aukštuolaitis then traveled to Warsaw to personally discuss the planned coup with Józef Piłsudski, Polish Chief of State.

The initial coup was postponed to 1 September 1919. However, some PMO units began their actions (cutting telegraph wires, damaging railways, etc.) as scheduled previously – on the night of 27 to 28 August. The Lithuanian intelligence intercepted and decoded the order to delay the coup. Since Lithuanians did not have a list of coup organizers, they began mass arrests of Polish activists and supporters on the night from 28 to 29 August. Several dozen Poles were arrested the first night, including Aukštuolaitis and 23 Polish officers serving in the Lithuanian Army. By the second night the number of arrested Poles grew to 200. Lithuanian intelligence did not find incriminating documents or cash with Auštuolaitis (the 800,000 marks were already transferred to Jonas Vanagaitis). Aukštuolaitis was held for 10 weeks and was released on 15 November 1919.

=== Later life ===
Aukštuolaitis then moved to Vilnius (then controlled by Poland) and worked to publish the anti-Lithuanian bilingual newspaper Suvienytoji Lietuva/Zjednoczona Litwa. In March 1920, General Silvestras Žukauskas met with Aukštuolaitis in Vilnius and published an article in Suvienytoji Lietuva/Zjednoczona Litwa advocating for a union between Lithuania and Poland. This stirred controversy among Lithuanian soldiers and deepened their suspicions that Žukauskas was a Polish sympathizer. It led to temporary retirement of Žukauskas from the Lithuanian Army.

In July 1920, when Soviet Union captured Vilnius, Aukštuolaitis moved to Klaipėda and supported Polish claims to the city. He continuously attempted to meddle in Lithuanian affairs, but was unsuccessful. In November 1920, he offered his services as a Lithuanian representative in the government of the Republic of Central Lithuania in the aftermath of the Żeligowski's Mutiny. He attempted to send a delegation of Prussian Lithuanians to the Conference of Ambassadors advocating for a "free city" solution to the question of the Klaipėda Region. According to the diary of Matas Šalčius, Aukštuolaitis wanted to organize an anti-Lithuanian action after the Klaipėda Revolt in January 1923. He further attempted to act as an intermediary between Poland and Lithuania in 1925 and 1927.

== Bibliography ==
- Čepėnas, Pranas (1986). Naujųjų laikų Lietuvos istorija (in Lithuanian). Vol. II. Chicago: Dr. Kazio Griniaus Fondas. OCLC 3220435.
- Kaunas, Domas; Žepkaitė, Regina (2000). "Jurgis Aukštuolaitis". Mažosios Lietuvos enciklopedija (in Lithuanian). Mokslo ir enciklopedijų leidybos centras.
- Lesčius, Vytautas (2004). Lietuvos kariuomenė nepriklausomybės kovose 1918–1920 (PDF). Lietuvos kariuomenės istorija (in Lithuanian). Vilnius: General Jonas Žemaitis Military Academy of Lithuania. ISBN 9955-423-23-4.
- Łossowski, Piotr (1995). Konflikt polsko-litewski 1918–1920 (in Polish). Książka i Wiedza. ISBN 83-05-12769-9.
- Pocytė, Silva (2023). "Prūsijos lietuviai ir Lietuvos nepriklausomybės kovos 1919 m. pirmoje pusėje" (PDF). Karo archyvas (in Lithuanian). XXXVIII: 73–107. ISSN 2424-6123.
- Riaubienė, Arida (2021). "Laikmečio aktualijos Mato Šalčiaus 1923 metų dienoraštyje". Istorija (in Lithuanian). 4 (121): 97–126. doi:10.15823/istorija.2021.124. hdl:20.500.12259/158513. ISSN 2029-7181.
- Surgailis, Gintautas (1992). Lietuvos kariuomenės vadai (in Lithuanian). Vilnius: Mintis. ISBN 5-417-00513-4.
- "Peržvalga. Atsivertė Vanagaitis" (PDF). Tėvynė (in Lithuanian). Vol. 51, no. XIII. 22 December 1922.
- Vainorius, Martynas (15 August 2022). "Kovoje už Klaipėdą – ir lietuviški, ir lenkiški pinigai" (in Lithuanian). Atvira Klaipėda.
- Vareikis, Vygantas (2024). "Sionizmo link: Rudolfo Valsonoko gyvenimo istorija XX amžiuje". Istorija (in Lithuanian). 2 (134): 54–72. doi:10.15823/istorija.2024.134.2. hdl:20.500.12259/272157. ISSN 2029-7181.
- Vasiliauskas, Antanas (1937). "Žemaičių batalionas". Karo archyvas (in Lithuanian). 8: 211–244.
- Žalys, Vytautas (2007). Lietuvos diplomatijos istorija (1925–1940) (in Lithuanian). Vol. I. Vilnius: Versus aureus. ISBN 978-9955-699-50-7.
