= Kristupas Lekšas =

Prussian Lithuanian activist

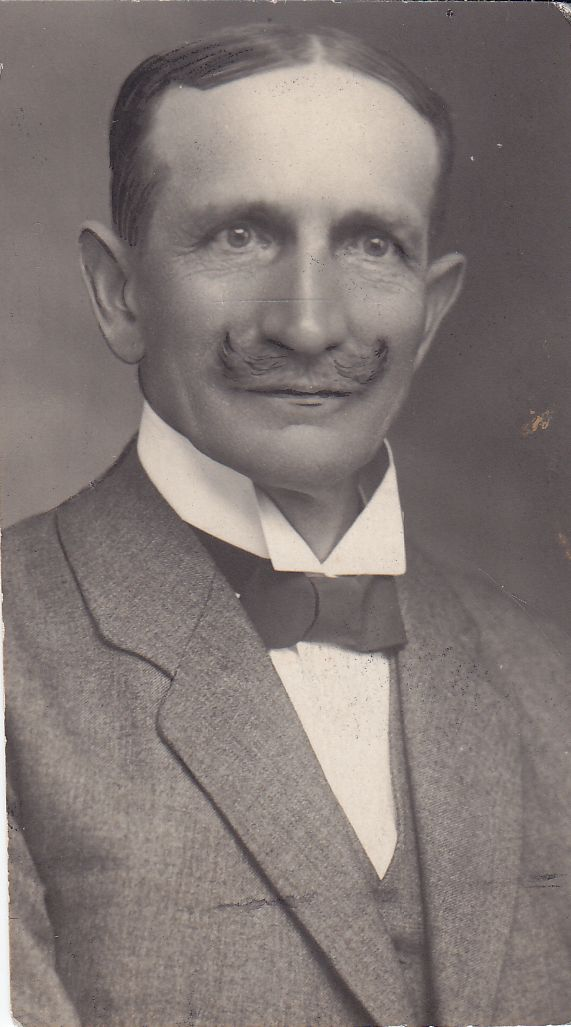
- Lekšas, c. 1923
- Born: 31 August 1872; Strilai, East Prussia
- Died: 30 March 1941 (aged 68); Klaipėda, Nazi Germany
- Occupations: Farmer, activist, poet
- Awards: Order of the Lithuanian Grand Duke Gediminas (1928)

Kristupas Lekšas (31 August 1872 – 30 March 1941) was a Prussian Lithuanian activist from Klaipėda Region.

Born to a farmer's family in East Prussia, Lekšas completed only primary education. He joined Prussian Lithuanian political and cultural life. He campaigned for pro-Lithuanian candidates to the Landtag of Prussia and Reichstag of Germany and attempted to establish a political party in 1914. After World War I, he supported the unification of the Klaipėda Region with Lithuania. As a representative of the National Council of Lithuania Minor, he was coopted by the Council of Lithuania in March 1920. During the Klaipėda Revolt in January 1923, Lekšas became a member of the first pro-Lithuanian Directorate of the Klaipėda Region and was later elected to the Parliament of the Klaipėda Region until 1938. Lekšas supported and represented small farmers, and helped organize a number of local farmers' associations.

Lekšas wrote poetry and published it in various Lithuanian periodicals. A collection of his poetry Rūtų vainikėlis was first published in 1908 and republished in 1922. He also wrote religious hymns. His hymnal Ziono varpelis was published in 1919 and republished in 1932.

== Biography ==
=== Early life ===
Lekšas was born on 31 August 1872 in Strilai in Landkreis Tilsit, East Prussia (present-day Šilutė District Municipality). His parents were affluent farmers, but he only attended a local primary school and hired private tutors. He worked at his family's farm until 1901. He owned shares in brickyard and sawmill in nearby Laugaliai and Versmininkai in 1900–1906. In 1914, he purchased a farm of 50 morgens in Dėkintai.

=== Pre-war activist ===
Lekšas join political activities of Prussian Lithuanians. In 1892 and 1896, he collected signatures on petitions to allow the Lithuanian language in local schools. He campaigned for pro-Lithuanian candidates to the Landtag of Prussia and Reichstag of Germany. In 1912, he was elected secretary of the Lithuanian Conservative Election Societies in the Tilsit–Elchniederung electoral district. In 1914, he attempted to establish International German–Lithuanian People's Party but it did not gain support.

Lekšas was also active in cultural life. He was an active member of Birutė Society which organized festivals and celebrations that featured Lithuanian-language performances. In 1912, he founded Bitelė, a literary supplement to Apžvalga. In 1913–1914, he was a member of a committee in charge of erecting a monument to poet Kristijonas Donelaitis on Rambynas hill (the project was not realized due to World War I).

=== Post-war activist ===
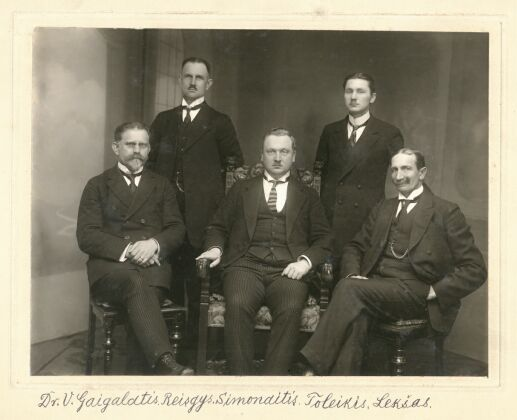
Five-member Directorate of the Klaipėda Region (Lekšas sits on the right)

After World War I, Klaipėda Region was detached from Germany and became a mandate of the League of Nations. Lekšas supported uniting the region with now independent Lithuania. In November 1918, he participated in founding of the National Council of Lithuania Minor but did not sign the Act of Tilsit. On 20 March 1920, Lekšas and three other members of the National Council of Lithuania Minor were coopted by the Council of Lithuania.

During the Klaipėda Revolt in January 1923, Lekšas became a member of the first pro-Lithuanian Directorate of the Klaipėda Region (this directorate was dismissed on 15 February 1923). Lekšas also joined a local chapter of the Lithuanian Riflemen's Union in Klaipėda. Lekšas was a member of the Parliament of the Klaipėda Region in 1925–1938 as well as the local council of Pagėgiai. He was the founder and chairman of the political party Union of Small Farmers (Mažųjų laukininkų susivienijimas) which merged into the Farmers' Center (Laukininkų centras) in 1934.

Lekšas supported and represented small farmers. He established a society of Prussian Lithuanian farmers in Šilutė in 1922. In 1923, he edited Laukininkas, weekly supplement of Lietuviška ceitunga. In May 1923, he cofounded an agricultural trading company Laukininkas in Klaipėda, but it ceased activities by 1926. In 1933, he became a board member of the Farmers' Association of the Klaipėda Region and was elected its vice-chairman in 1937. He also helped organizing several local youth organizations, including Vainikas in Katyčiai, Varpas in Natkiškiai, Ažuolas in Plaškiai.

Additionally, Lekšas was active in Lutheran religious life. He was elected to the Lutheran parish council of Katyčiai several times and was a member of the synod of the Klaipėda Region since 1924. In 1925, Lekšas was a member of the delegation negotiating region's administration in the Evangelical Church of the old-Prussian Union. As a result of these negotiations, parishes of the Klaipėda Region were separated form the Ecclesiastical Province of East Prussia and formed their own Regional Synodal Federation of the Klaipėda Region (Landessynodalverband Memelgebiet).

In 1928, Lekšas was awarded the Order of the Lithuanian Grand Duke Gediminas (4th degree) by the Lithuanian government.

=== Death and legacy ===
In March 1939, Nazi Germany annexed Klaipėda Region but unlike many other pro-Lithuanian activists Lekšas did not leave Klaipėda. He died of an illness on 30 March 1941 in city's hospital. In 1944, as Soviets approached, his wife and son retreated to Germany and later emigrated the United States.

Lekšas was buried in the evangelical cemetery in Laugaliai. His grave was neglected during the Soviet era, but was restored after Lithuanian regained independence in 1990. The cemetery was restored in summer 2015. Since then, the grave is visited and maintained by librarians from Katyčiai and Degučiai.

A street in Šilutė is named after Lekšas. In 2012, Šilutė Public Library organized an exhibition for his 140th birth anniversary.

== Poetry ==
Lekšas began writing poetry at the age of 16. Some of his poems were printed in various Lithuanian periodicals (including Kaimynas, Nauja lietuviška ceitunga, Saulėteka, Tilžės keleivis, Lietuvos keleivis), usually signed by pen name Vieversėlis. A collection of his poetry Rūtų vainikėlis was first published in 1908 and republished in 1922. This collection featured greetings and celebratory poetry for special occasions (weddings, birthdays, anniversaries). His poetry shows clear influence of Maironis and often feature imagery of ancient Lithuania, Rambynas, Lithuanian traditions. His work often advocate for virtue and faith.

Lekšas also created religious hymns. In 1909, he assisted priest Endrikis Endrulaitis from Priekulė in preparing a hymnal for publication. In 1919, Lekšas published his own hymnal Ziono varpelis. Its second edition in 1932, contained 140 hymns, of which 101 were written by Lekšas and others were translated from German. In 1925, together with Mikelis Kundrius, he published hymnal Draugystės giesmių knygelės which contained 454 hymns.

A number of works by Lekšas were not published. In fall 1944, his widow buried three notebooks with Lekšas' works by their farm in Dėkintai in hopes of protecting them from the advancing Soviet forces.
