= Gabriel Jean Petisné =

French lawyer and commissioner

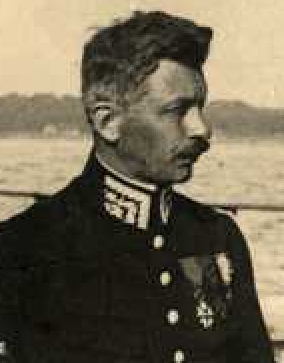

High Civil Commissioner of the Klaipėda Region
- In office 1 May 1921 – 15 January 1923
- Preceded by: Dominique Joseph Odry
- Succeeded by: Office abolished, succeeded in Lithuania by Jonas Budrys

Personal details
- Born: 14 June 1881 Bordeaux, France
- Died: 4 December 1931 (aged 50) Bordeaux, France
- Occupation: Governor, lawyer

Gabriel Jean Petisné (14 June 1881 – 4 December 1931) was a French lawyer and commissioner of the Klaipėda Region before its incorporation into Lithuania after the Klaipėda Revolt.

== Biography ==
Gabriel Jean Petisné was born on 14 June 1881 in Bordeaux, France. Educated as an attorney, Petisné entered the government service as an attaché to the office of the Under-Secretary of State for Fine Arts. In 1908–1909, he briefly served as secretary general of Lozère and Gers. In February 1909, he became sub-prefect of Bazas. In 1911, he briefly returned to Paris before his appointment as sub-prefect to Châteaudun. He later served as general secretary of Vienne, Gironde (1917), Rhône police (1918), and prefect of Mayenne (1920).

=== Klaipėda Region ===
From 8 June 1920 to 30 April 1921, he was prefect of the Klaipėda Region (Memel Territory). On 4 October 1920, Petisné created a 20-person pro-German state council. On 1 May 1921, Petisné succeeded Dominique Joseph Odry, who was appointed by the League of Nations, as high civil commissioner of the region. He then hoisted the four flags of the signatory powers of World War I in the region. The Directorate, the Council, and the Administrative Court appointed by him consisted almost exclusively of Germans.

During his tenure, Petisné propagated the idea of Klaipėda becoming a Freistaat, presenting the idea to the Conference of Ambassadors in November 1922. He had a German movement founded, the Arbeitsgemeinschaft für den Freistaat Memel (Society for Free State Memel), which aimed to gradually establish the independence of the region. As commissioner, Petisné avoided establishing closer economic and cultural relations with Lithuania, publishing several legal acts regulating the economy and social life of the region. Nonetheless, he published three decrees protecting the Lithuanian language.

Although the French monitored Lithuanian activity in the region to some extent, with Petisné writing to the French government that the Lithuanians would "soon strike Memel", as well as organizing sabotage of some railways in Lithuania, the response was lackluster and unconcerned. The Lithuanian-organized Klaipėda Revolt successfully took control of the region by 15 January 1923. Petisné was confronted by one of its leaders, Mykolas Kalmantas, who arrested Petisné with a revolver after the commissioner demanded Klamantas show his papers. On 19 February, he left Klaipėda with Entente warships, fully surrendering the region to Lithuania.

Petisné died on 4 December 1931 in Bordeaux.

== Bibliography ==
- Vaitiekus, Severinas (2023). Kas mūsų – kova įgysim: Lietuvių žvalgybos vaidmuo sujungiant Didžiąją ir Mažąją Lietuvą (in Lithuanian). Vilnius: Genocide and Resistance Research Centre of Lithuania. ISBN 9786098298390.
