= Act of Tilsit =

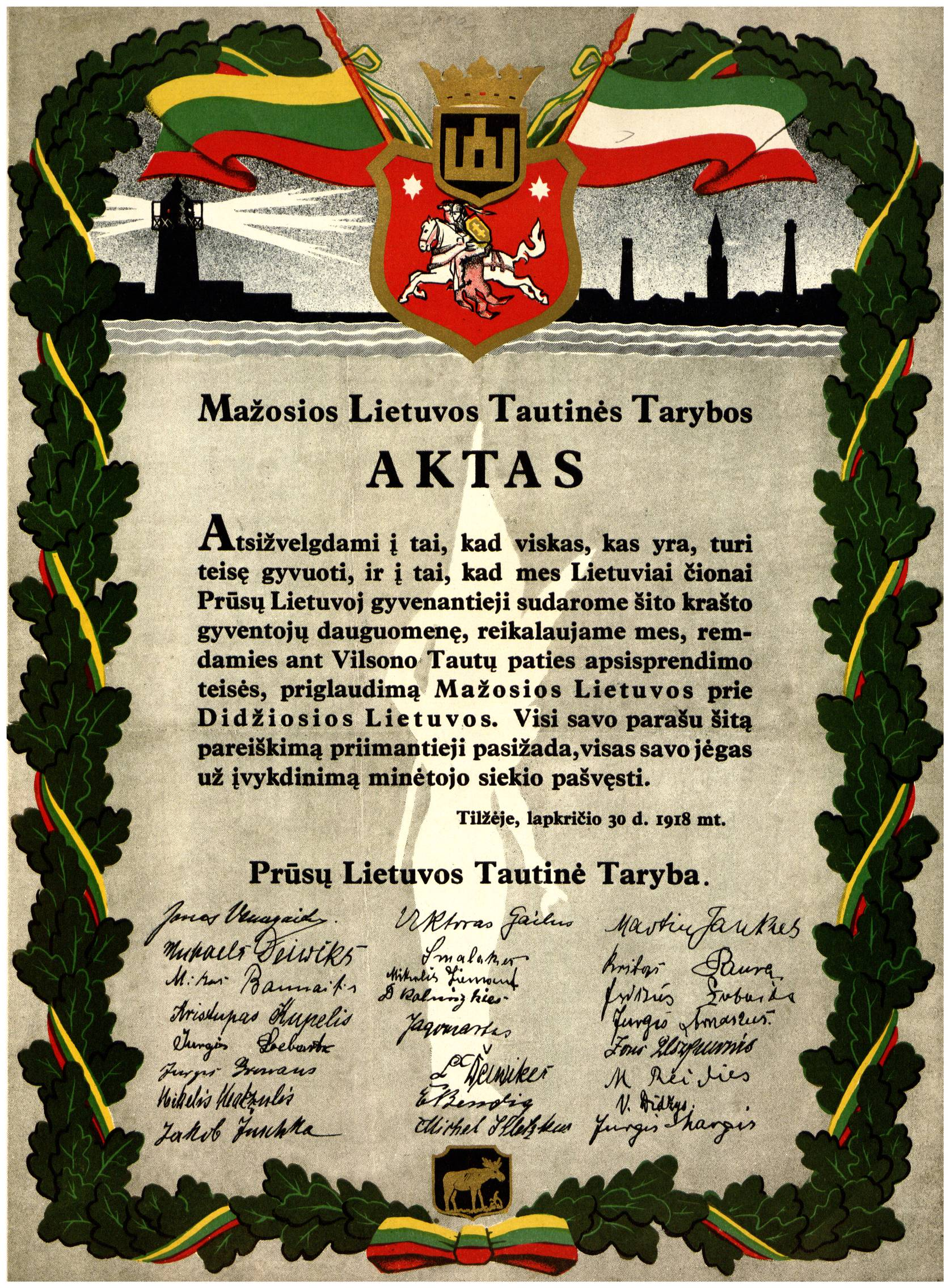
A 1936 poster of the act

The Act of Tilsit (Lithuanian: Tilžės aktas) was an act signed by 24 members of the National Council of Lithuania Minor on 30 November 1918 in Tilsit. The signatories demanded the unification of Lithuania Minor and Lithuania Proper into a single Lithuanian state. This would mean detaching the northern areas of East Prussia, inhabited by Prussian Lithuanians, from the German Empire. Virtually unknown in interwar Lithuania, the act has since become a symbol of Lithuanian claims to Lithuania Minor.

== Enactment ==
East Prussia (part of the German Empire) had a large Lithuanian-speaking population of Prussian Lithuanians. During the Lithuanian National Revival, ideas about uniting all Lithuanian speakers began to spread. The German Revolution started on 29 October and Germany surrendered on 11 November 1918 bringing in political opportunities.

On 2 November 1918, Lietuwißka Ceitunga published a rumor that U.S. President Woodrow Wilson promised to Lithuanian Americans that Lithuanian-inhabited areas of East Prussia would be attached to Lithuania. Such rumors spread in the region causing protests by the Germans. Two protest meetings took place in Klaipėda on 13 November attracting more than 3,200 attendees. Another protest was printed in Tilsiter Allgemeine Zeitung by three German city officials in Ragnit which prompted a rebuke by the Lithuanian activists, including Martynas Jankus, Erdmonas Simonaitis, and Jonas Vanagaitis. These men then organized a committee of activists who supported the unification of Prussian Lithuanians and Lithuanians.

On 16 November 1918, the activists' committee convened a conference of representatives of Prussian Lithuanians in Tilsit. The conference established the National Council of Lithuania Minor. Two weeks later, on 30 November 1918, the council adopted the Act of Tilsit.

The act was very short – 53 words in two sentences in Lithuanian. The first sentence, citing the right of self-determination outlined in the Fourteen Points by the U.S. President Woodrow Wilson, Prussian Lithuanians demanded to attach Lithuania Minor to Lithuania Proper. The second sentence promised that all signatories will devote all their effort to see this goal accomplished.

The National Council continued to lobby for the unification at the Paris Peace Conference and the Conference of Ambassadors. Lithuania gained the Klaipėda Region (small part of East Prussia north of the Neman River) after the Klaipėda Revolt in January 1923.

== Signatories ==
The act was signed by 24 men, including Martynas Jankus, Jonas Vanagaitis, Viktoras Gailius, Enzys Jagomastas. The age of the signatories ranged from 22-year old to 60-year old. None of the signatories were Lutheran priests, the traditional leaders in Prussian Lithuanian communities.

The act was not signed by several of the most prominent pro-Lithuanian Prussian Lithuanian leaders. Erdmonas Simonaitis did not sign it as he had to travel to complete his military duty. Vydūnas at the time was in Berlin delivering lectures. The act was also not signed by Vilius Gaigalaitis who was elected chairman of the National Council but refused to the post due to political backlash. Other non-signatories included Adomas Brakas and Kristupas Lekšas.

== Historiography and impact ==
The act was virtually unknown in the Lithuanian historiography until the late 1930s. Before then, the act was not mentioned in contemporary Prussian Lithuanian press, memoirs of Prussian Lithuanians, or studies of the Klaipėda Region. In 1926, a poster with the text of the act was printed but it is rare. In 1936, act's signatory Jonas Vanagaitis published an artistic poster with the text of the act in color which became popular and is frequently reproduced in various publications. Vanagaitis then published his memoirs in 1938 which supplied essentially all known information about the act. Future authors primarily retold the information provided by Vanagaitis while the act and its historical circumstances await independent study from a professional historian.

Vanagaitis portrayed the Act of Tilsit as a key document showing political aspirations of Prussian Lithuanians at the end of World War I. After World War II, most of East Prussia was turned into the Kaliningrad Oblast and attached to the Russian SFSR. Prussian Lithuanian who had retreated to Germany during the war organized the Council of Lithuania Minor in Fulda. It was chaired by Erdmonas Simonaitis and claimed to continue the traditions of the National Council of Lithuania Minor. On 6 November 1946, this council adopted a proclamation, known as the Act of Fulda, demanding that Kaliningrad Oblast would be attached to Lithuania. As legal basis for this demand, the council cited the Act of Tilsit.

The Act of Tilsit became politically relevant again during the dissolution of the Soviet Union in the late 1980s. It was unclear whether Germany or Russia would extend territorial claims to the Klaipėda Region. 30 November, the anniversary of the act, was marked with various annual events and was added to the list of commemorative days by the Seimas (parliament of Lithuania) in 1998.

In independent Lithuania, the Act of Tilsit is presented as a symbol of Lithuanian claims to Lithuania Minor. For example, Vytautas Povilas Šilas, chairman of the Council of Lithuania Minor Affairs, wrote that "The Act of Tilsit reminds everyone that Lithuania Minor is our Lithuanian land regardless of whether we ever regain it." Sometimes its importance is compared to the Act of Independence of Lithuania.

== Original document ==
In November 2022, the original Act of Tilsit was discovered at the Vytautas the Great War Museum. It was acquired by the museum in 1983 from a private person and hid among other holdings to protect it from the Soviet authorities. The museum holds two versions of the act – the original handwritten act with original signatures and the typed act with signatories' names handwritten by one person. Both of these documents are attached to the same piece of paper.

== Bibliography ==
- Aleknavičius, Bernardas (22 January – 11 February 2004). "Nors nuritintas akmuo..." Mokslo Lietuva (in Lithuanian). 2 (292). ISSN 1392-7191.
- Antanavičius, Ugnius (30 November 2022). "Paaiškėjo dingusiu laikyto Lietuvai svarbaus Tilžės akto likimas: nebuvo dingęs, o tik paslėptas". 15min.lt (in Lithuanian).
- Atvira Klaipėda (11 December 2019). "Tilžės aktas: kam jis buvo naudingas?" (in Lithuanian).
- Matulevičius, Algirdas (21 December 2018). "Tilžės aktas – Mažosios Lietuvos nepriklausomybės deklaracija. Šimtmečiui paminėti: 1918–2018". Mokslo Lietuva (in Lithuanian). 22 (621). ISSN 1392-7191.
- Safronovas, Vasilijus (2008). "Tilžės akto mįslės" (PDF). Kultūros barai (in Lithuanian). 11: 80–85. ISSN 0134-3106.
- Šilas, Vytautas (1998). "Mažlietuvių apsisprendimo aktas". Mokslas ir gyvenimas (in Lithuanian). 11–12 (491–492). ISSN 0134-3084. Archived from the original on 27 September 2006.
