= Erdmonas Simonaitis =

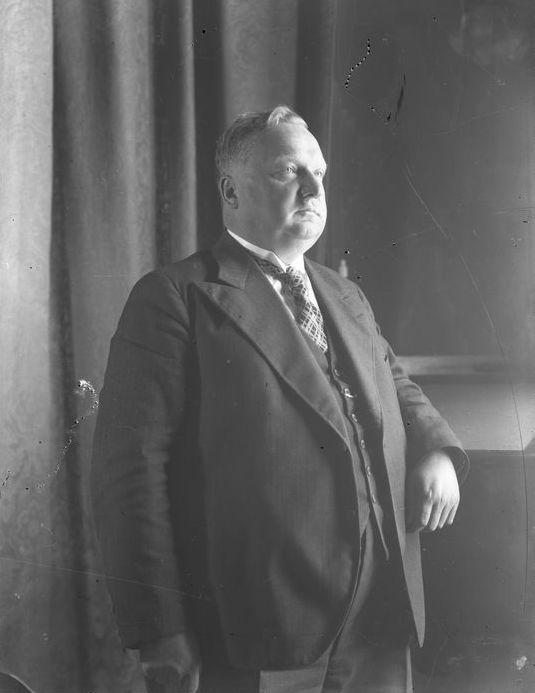
- Simonaitis in 1930s
- Born: 30 October 1888; Juschka-Spötzen (Spiečiai (Juknaičiai)), East Prussia, German Empire
- Died: 24 February 1969 (aged 80); Weinheim, Germany
- Resting place: Klaipėda cemetery
- Awards: Iron Cross; Order of Vytautas the Great; Order of the Lithuanian Grand Duke Gediminas

Erdmonas Simonaitis (30 October 1888 – 24 February 1969) was a Prussian Lithuanian activist particularly active in the Klaipėda Region (Memel Territory) and advocating its union with Lithuania. During the staged Klaipėda Revolt of 1923, he headed the pro-Lithuanian government of the region. For his anti-German activities, he was persecuted by the Nazis during World War II. He survived the Mauthausen-Gusen and Dachau concentration camps. After the war he remained in Germany and rejoined various Lithuanian organizations. He was awarded the Order of Vytautas the Great and Order of the Lithuanian Grand Duke Gediminas.

== Early life ==
Simonaitis received his education in Heydekrug (Šilutė) and Tilsit (Sovetsk) and worked as a court clerk. He became a Lithuanian activist in 1909. In 1912, he was co-founder of the Lithuanian Club of Tilsit (Lithuanian: Tilžės lietuvių klubas), which he chaired for two years. In 1915, Simonaitis was mobilized into the German Army. He was awarded the Iron Cross for his military service in France and Galicia. After World War I, he briefly worked in Vilnius where he became acquainted with Lithuanian politicians and the Council of Lithuania. After returning to Tilsit in 1918, he participated in the activities of the National Council of Lithuania Minor (Lithuanian: Mažosios Lietuvos tautinė taryba), which adopted the Act of Tilsit but Simonaitis did not sign it. In 1919 he moved to Memel (Klaipėda). In early 1919, he was appointed adjutant of the short-lived Samogitian Battalion organized by Jurgis Aukštuolaitis in Tauragė.

== Klaipėda Region ==
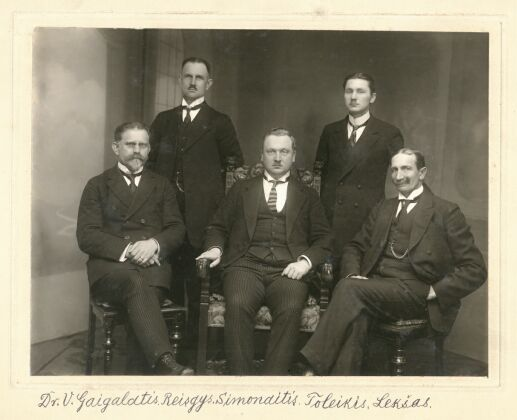
Klaipėda Directorate in 1923. Simonaitis is sitting in the center.

According to the Treaty of Versailles, the Klaipėda Region (Memel Territory) was detached from the German Empire and placed under provisional French administration. French General Dominique Joseph Odry established seven-member Directorate (local government) in February 1920. Initially all of its members were German. After Lithuanian protests, two Prussian Lithuanians, Simonaitis and Mikelis Reidys, were admitted to the Directorate increasing its size to nine members. Simonaitis resigned in February 1922.

Simonaitis lobbied the League of Nations and the Conference of Ambassadors to unite the Klaipėda region with Lithuania. However, others thought that the region should be turned into a free city, similar to the Free City of Danzig. Therefore, the Lithuanian government decided to organize the Klaipėda Revolt, take the region by force, and present a fait accompli. Simonaitis agreed to head the government, which would be installed by the rebels. On 9 January 1923, the Supreme Committee for the Salvation of Lithuania Minor declared that the old Directorate was dissolved and authorized Simonaitis to form a new Directorate within three days. The rebel's petition to unite with Lithuania was approved by the First Seimas (parliament of Lithuania) on 14 January. To appease the Allies, Simonaitis was dismissed and replaced by Viktoras Gailius. After the Klaipėda Convention was signed in May 1924, formalizing the incorporation of the region into Lithuania, Simonaitis became chairman of the Directorate (January–November 1926), governor of Šilutė (1924–1926) and Klaipėda Counties (1930–1934), and mayor of Klaipėda (July 1934 – April 1935).

== World War II and after ==
In March 1939, Nazi Germany presented an oral ultimatum to Lithuania demanding to cede the Klaipėda Region. Lithuania accepted and Simonaitis, fearing Nazi persecution, moved to Kaunas. After the occupation of Lithuania by Nazi Germany in June 1941, Simonaitis was arrested by the Gestapo and sent to the Mauthausen-Gusen concentration camp in November 1942. In April 1945, he was liberated from the Dachau concentration camp. After the war he remained in West Germany, returning to Prussian Lithuanian activism. He chaired the Council of Lithuania Minor until his death, represented Lithuania Minor at the Supreme Committee for the Liberation of Lithuania, and was vice-chairman of the German chapter of the Lithuanian World Community.

== Personal life and children ==
In 1911, Simonaitis married Margaretha Plaumann, a German woman. They had four children: daughters Ana Marija and Birutė Neringa and sons Vitold-Vytautas and George-Jurgis. Vitoldas-Vytautas was mobilized into the Wehrmacht and died in 1941 in the Battle of Leningrad. Margaretha and Ana Marija attempted to flee Lithuania after the war, but were stopped by the Soviet police. They changed their names to Elena and Ona in an attempt to hide their German descent and returned to Klaipėda. Birutė Neringa was forcefully taken to Germany as a translator. She met her father at Dachau, but returned to Lithuania in 1948. His remains were reburied in Klaipėda cemetery in 1991.
