= Council of Ambassadors (disambiguation) =

The Council of Ambassadors had been and is the name of several organisations:

- Council of Ambassadors, was an intergovernmental agency, founded in 1919 to implement the provisions of the Treaty of Versailles.
- Council of Ambassadors (Visegrad) one of two governing bodies of the International Visegrad Fund an institution of the Visegrád Group
- WWF Council of Ambassadors, as eminent individuals, their role as ambassadors is to promote World Wildlife Fund's work and to assist us in specific areas where we would benefit from their advice or participation.
