= Klaipėda Revolt =

1923 Lithuania unification revolt

- Part of the aftermath of World War I
- Historical map of Klaipėda Region (Memelland) and the northern part of East Prussia
Date	January 10–15, 1923
Location	Klaipėda Region 55°42′45″N 21°08′06″E
Result	Lithuanian victory: Klaipėda Region unified with Lithuania

Belligerents
French Administration	Lithuania; Lithuanian Riflemen's Union; Klaipėda Directorate

Commanders and leaders
Gabriel Jean Petisné	Ernestas Galvanauskas; Vincas Krėvė-Mickevičius; Jonas Polovinskas-Budrys; Erdmonas Simonaitis

Strength
Around 250 French soldiers, 350 German policemen and 300 civilian volunteers	1,753 men

Casualties and losses
2 French soldiers and 1 German policeman killed	12 killed

The Klaipėda Revolt took place in January 1923 in the Klaipėda Region (also known as the Memel Territory or Memelland). The region, located north of the Neman River, was detached from East Prussia, German Empire by the Treaty of Versailles and became a mandate of the League of Nations. It was placed under provisional French administration until a more permanent solution could be worked out. Lithuania wanted to unite with the region (part of Lithuania Minor) due to its large Lithuanian-speaking population of Prussian Lithuanians and major port of Klaipėda (Memel) – the only viable access to the Baltic Sea for Lithuania. As the Conference of Ambassadors favoured leaving the region as a free city, similar to the Free City of Danzig, the Lithuanians organized and staged a revolt.

Presented as an uprising of the local population, the revolt met little resistance from either the German police or the French troops. The rebels established a pro-Lithuanian administration, which petitioned to unite with Lithuania, citing the right of self-determination. The League of Nations accepted the fait accompli and the Klaipėda Region was transferred as an autonomous territory to the Republic of Lithuania on February 17, 1923. After prolonged negotiations, a formal international agreement, the Klaipėda Convention, was signed in May 1924. The convention formally acknowledged Lithuania's sovereignty in the region and outlined its extensive legislative, judicial, administrative, and financial autonomy. The region remained part of Lithuania until March 1939 when it was transferred to Nazi Germany after a German ultimatum.

== Background ==
=== Lithuanian and Polish aspirations ===
The German–Lithuanian border had been stable since the Treaty of Melno in 1422. However, northern East Prussia had a significant Lithuanian-speaking population of Prussian Lithuanians or Lietuvninkai and was known as Lithuania Minor. The Klaipėda Region covered 2,848 km^{2} (1,100 sq mi), which included the Curonian Lagoon of approximately 412 km^{2} (159 sq mi). According to the Prussian Census of 1910, the city of Memel numbered 21,419 inhabitants, of whom 92% were German and 8% were Lithuanian, while the countryside was inhabited by a Lithuanian majority of 66%. In the Memel region as a whole, the Germans constituted 50.7% (71,191), the Lithuanians 47.9% (67,345), and the bilingual population (composed mostly of Lithuanians) – 1.4% (1,970). According to contemporary statistics by Fred Hermann Deu, 71,156 Germans and 67,259 Prussian Lithuanians lived in the region. The census that was carried out just after the revolt demonstrated slightly different results in 1925. It recorded the region's total population at 141,000. Declared language was used to classify the inhabitants, and on this basis 43.5% were German, 27.6% were Lithuanian, and 25.2% were "Klaipėdan" (Memeländisch) – those who spoke Lithuanian, but named themselves locals to distinguish from other Lithuanian population. Other sources give the interwar ethnic composition as 41.9% German, 27.1% Memeländisch, and 26.6% Lithuanian.

The idea of uniting Lithuania Minor with Lithuania surfaced during the Lithuanian National Revival of the late 19th century. It was part of the vision to consolidate all ethnic Lithuanian lands into an independent Lithuania. The activists also eyed Klaipėda (Memel), a major sea port in the Baltic Sea. It would become Lithuania's only deep-water access to the sea and having a port was seen as an economic necessity for self-sustainability. On November 30, 1918, twenty-four Prussian Lithuanian activists signed the Act of Tilsit, expressing their desire to unite Lithuania Minor with Lithuania. Based on these considerations, the Lithuanians petitioned the Allies to attach the whole of Lithuania Minor (not limited to Klaipėda Region) to Lithuania. However, at the time Lithuania was not officially recognized by the western powers and not invited into any post-war conferences. Lithuania was recognized by the United States in July 1922 and by most western powers in December 1922.

The Second Polish Republic regarded the Klaipėda Region as possible compensation for Danzig. After World War I, the Polish Corridor provided access to the Baltic Sea, but the Free City of Danzig was not granted to Poland. In early 1919, Roman Dmowski, the Polish representative to the Paris Peace Conference, campaigned for the incorporation of Klaipėda Region into Lithuania, which was then to enter into a union with Poland (see Dmowski's Line and Międzymorze federation). The Polish formula was Klaipėda to Lithuania, Lithuania to Poland. Until the Polish–Lithuanian union could be worked out, Klaipėda was to be placed under the temporary administration of the Allies. While such a union had a historic tradition in the Polish–Lithuanian Commonwealth, Lithuania categorically refused any such proposals. Worsening Polish–Lithuanian relations led to the Polish–Lithuanian War and dispute over the Vilnius Region. However, the union idea was met favorably in Western Europe. In December 1921, Poland sent Marceli Szarota as a new envoy to the region. Due to his initiative, Poland and Klaipėda signed a trade agreement in April 1922. In addition, Poland attempted to establish its economic presence by buying property, establishing business enterprises, and making connections with the port.

=== French administration ===
Germany after Versailles: Administered by the League of Nations Annexed or transferred to neighboring countries by the treaty, or later via plebiscite and League of Nation action Weimar Germany

Influenced by the Polish proposals, the Allies took Klaipėda Region into account when signing the peace treaty with Germany. According to article 28 of the Treaty of Versailles, effective January 10, 1920, lands north of the Neman River were detached from the German Empire and, according to article 99, were placed under a mandate of the League of Nations. The French agreed to become temporary administrators of the region while the British declined. The first French troops, the 21st Battalion of Chasseurs Alpins under General Dominique Joseph Odry, arrived on February 10, 1920. The Germans officially handed over the region on February 15. Two days later General Odry established a seven-member Directorate—the main governing institution. After Lithuanian protests, two Prussian Lithuanian representatives were admitted to the Directorate, increasing its size to nine members. On June 8, 1920, France appointed Gabriel Jean Petisné as the head of the civilian administration in the Klaipėda Region. Petisné showed anti-Lithuanian bias and was favorable towards the idea of a free city. General Odry resigned on May 1, 1920, leaving Petisné the highest-ranking official in the region.

French Prime Minister and chairman of the Paris Peace Conference Georges Clemenceau commented that the Klaipėda Region was not attached to Lithuania because it had not yet received de jure recognition. The Lithuanians seized this statement and further campaigned for their rights in the region believing that once they received international recognition, the region should be theirs. As the mediation of the Polish–Lithuanian conflict over the Vilnius Region by the League of Nations was going nowhere, the Klaipėda Region became a major bargaining chip. Already in 1921, implicit "Klaipėda-for-Vilnius" offers were made. In March 1922, the British made a concrete and explicit offer: in exchange for recognition of Polish claims to Vilnius, Lithuania would receive de jure recognition, Klaipėda Region, and economic aid. The Lithuanians rejected the proposal as they were not ready to give up on Vilnius. After the rejection, the French and British attitudes turned against Lithuania and they now favored the free city solution (Freistadt like the Free City of Danzig). Thus the Lithuanians could wait for an unfavorable decision or they could seize the region and present a fait accompli.

== Preparations ==
=== Decision ===
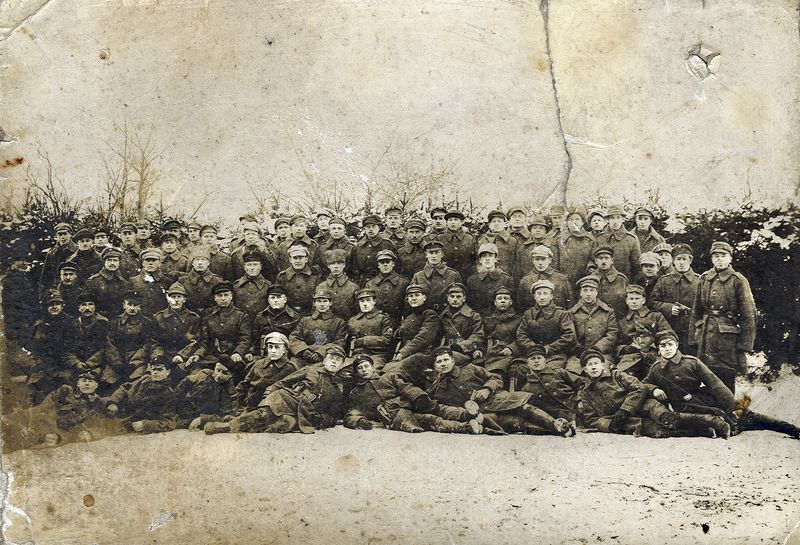
Participants of the Klaipėda Revolt in Klaipėda, Lithuania, 1923

On November 3–4, 1922, a delegation of Prussian Lithuanians unsuccessfully pleaded the Lithuanian case to the Conference of Ambassadors. This failure became the impetus to organize the uprising. During a secret session on November 20, 1922, the Lithuanian government decided to organize the revolt. They recognized that the diplomatic efforts through the League of Nations or the Conference of Ambassadors were fruitless and economic measures to sway the inhabitants towards Lithuania were too expensive and ineffective in international diplomacy. General Silvestras Žukauskas claimed that the Lithuanian Army could disarm the small French regiment and take the region in 24 hours. However, a direct military action against France was too dangerous, both in military and diplomatic sense. Therefore, it was decided to stage a local revolt, using the example of the Polish Żeligowski's Mutiny in October 1920.

The preparations were left in the hands of Prime Minister Ernestas Galvanauskas. While he delegated specific tasks, the grand plan was kept secret even from the First Seimas or Ministry of Foreign Affairs and thus very few Lithuanians understood the full role of the government in the revolt. Thus the main credit for organization of the revolt is sometimes given to Vincas Krėvė-Mickevičius, Chairman of the Lithuanian Riflemen's Union, which provided the manpower. Galvanauskas planned to present the revolt as a genuine uprising of the local population against its German Directorate and not against the French or Allied administration. Such plan was designed to direct Allied protests away from the Lithuanian government and to exploit the anti-German sentiment in Europe. Galvanauskas was careful to hide any links between the rebels and the Lithuanian government so that if the revolt failed he could blame the Riflemen and the rebels absolving the government of any responsibility. Galvanauskas warned that all those involved could be subject to criminal prosecutions if it was necessary for Lithuania's prestige.

=== Propaganda campaigns ===
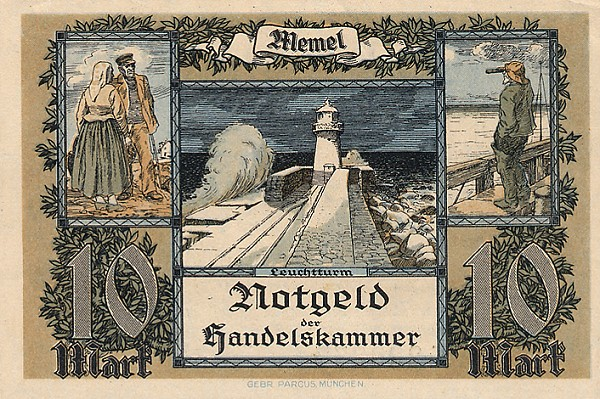
Emergency money (notgeld) issued in the Klaipėda Region in 1922 to combat inflation

The local population was engaged in the political tug of war between Germany, Lithuania, and free city. Reunion with Germany was a political impossibility, but local Germans wished to preserve their political and cultural dominance in the region. While Prussian Lithuanians spoke the Lithuanian language, they had developed their own complex identity, including a different religion (Lutherans as opposed to Roman Catholic Lithuanians). The Lithuanians were seen as both economically and culturally backward people. Farmers and industry workers worried that cheaper produce and labor from Lithuania would destroy their livelihood. Therefore, the idea of a free city was gaining momentum. At the end of 1921, Arbeitsgemeinschaft für den Freistaat Memel (Society for Free State Memel) collected 54,429 signatures out of 71,856 total eligible residents (75.7%) in support of the free state.

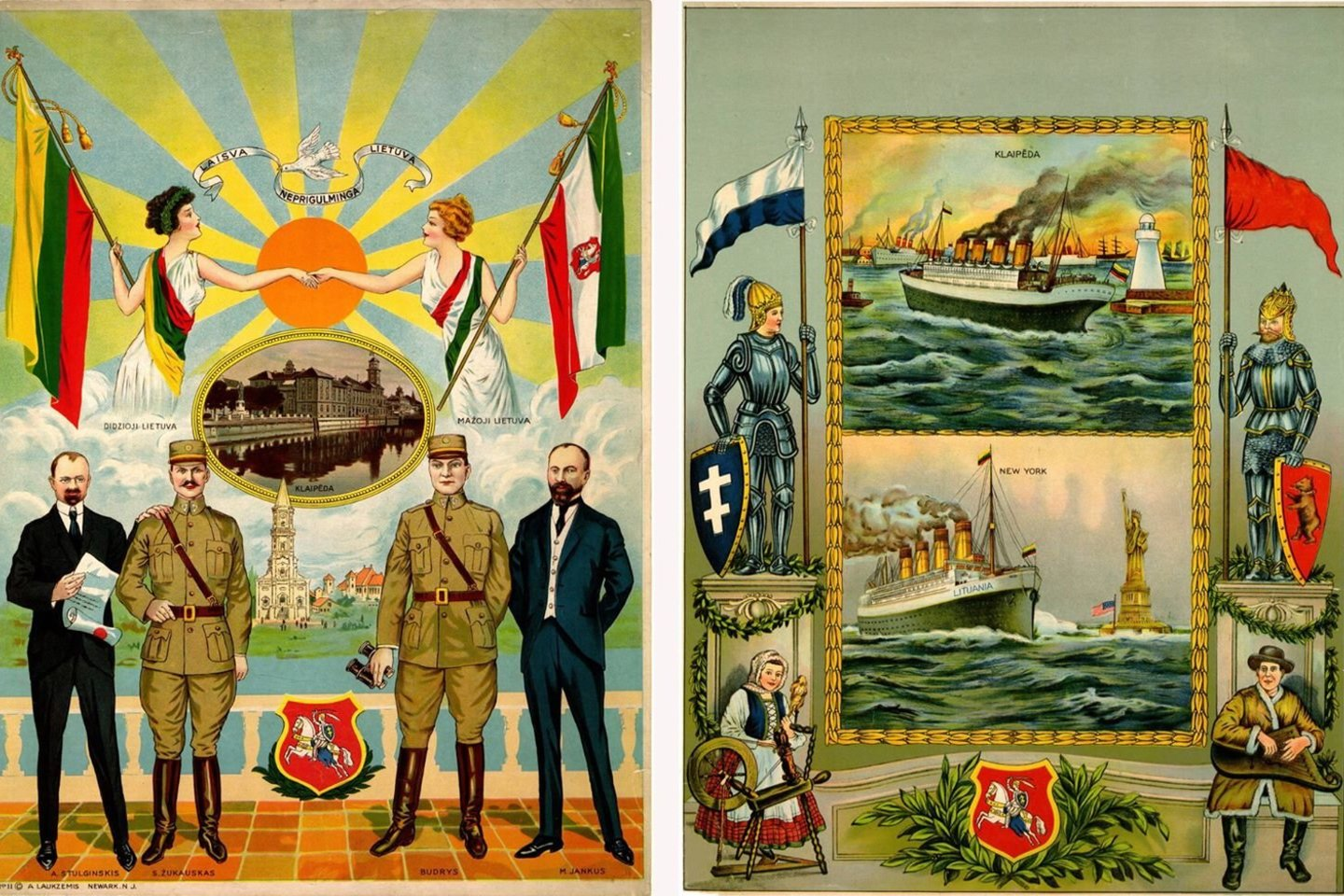
Two Lithuanian posters: the left one is depicting the unification of Lithuania proper and Lithuania Minor, while the right one is depicting the connection of the Port of Klaipėda with New York City

Therefore, even before the decision to organize the revolt, Lithuania attempted to maximize its influence and attract supporters in the region. Lithuania restricted its trade to demonstrate region's economic dependence as it did not produce enough food. The economic situation was further complicated by the beginning of hyperinflation of the German mark, which the region used as its currency. The Lithuanian cause was also supported by industrialists, who expected cheap labor and raw materials from Lithuania. Lithuanians also engaged in intense propaganda. They established and financed pro-Lithuanian organizations and acquired interest in local press. Many of these activities were coordinated by Lithuanian envoy Jonas Žilius, who received 500,000 German marks for such purposes. Banker Jonas Vailokaitis donated US$12,500 (equivalent to $236,206.05 in 2025) for the cause and pledged another $10,000 if needed. Additional support was provided by Lithuanian Americans, including Antanas Ivaškevičius (Ivas) and Andrius Martusevičius (Martus). For several weeks before the revolt, the local press reported on alleged Polish plans for the region. This was designed to strengthen the anti-Polish sentiment and paint Lithuania as a more favorable solution. It seems that these actions had the intended result and public opinion shifted towards Lithuania.

=== International diplomacy ===
Germany understood that the region would not be re-attached. Therefore, they favored the lesser of two evils and tacitly supported the interests of Lithuania. The Weimar Republic saw both Poland and France as its major enemies while Lithuania was more neutral. Also, once Germany restored its might, it would be much easier to recapture the region from weaker Lithuania than from larger Poland. Already on February 22, 1922, the Germans unofficially informed the Lithuanians that they were not opposed to Lithuanian action in Klaipėda and that, understandably, such a stance would never be officially declared. Such attitudes were later confirmed in other unofficial German–Lithuanian communications and even during the revolt, when Berlin urged local Germans not to hinder the Lithuanian plans.

When the Allies contemplated turning Klaipėda into a free city like Danzig, Polish Foreign Minister Konstanty Skirmunt believed that such a free city would hurt the Polish interest by allowing Germany to maintain its influence in the region. Skirmunt instead supported the transfer of the region to Lithuania if Poland would secure unrestricted trade via the Neman River and the port. At the same time Poland was preoccupied by other issues (assassination of President Gabriel Narutowicz, economic crisis, territorial disputes in Silesia, tense relations with Soviet Russia) and paid less attention to Klaipėda. Lithuania understood that a military action against Polish interest in the region could resume the Polish–Lithuanian War. To counter the expected backlash from Poland and France, the Lithuanians looked for an ally in Soviet Russia, which opposed a strong Polish state. On November 29, Soviet Foreign Minister Georgy Chicherin stopped briefly in Kaunas on his way to Berlin. In a conversation with Galvanauskas, Chicherin expressed support for Lithuanian plans in Klaipėda and declared that Soviet Russia would not remain passive if Poland moved against Lithuania.

=== Timing ===
On December 18, 1922, a committee of the Conference of Ambassadors scheduled the presentation of a proposal for the future of the region on January 10, 1923. While the content of the proposal was not known until after the start of the revolt, the Lithuanians expected the decision to be against their interest and hastened their preparations. Indeed, the committee proposed either creating a free city (an autonomous region under the League of Nations) or transferring the region to Lithuania if it agreed to a union with Poland. January 1923 was also convenient as France was distracted by the occupation of the Ruhr and Europe feared the outbreak of another war. The domestic situation in Lithuania was also favorable: Galvanauskas, as the Prime Minister, had extensive powers while the First Seimas was deadlocked and the election of President Aleksandras Stulginskis, who strongly opposed the revolt, was contested.

== Revolt ==
=== Political actions ===
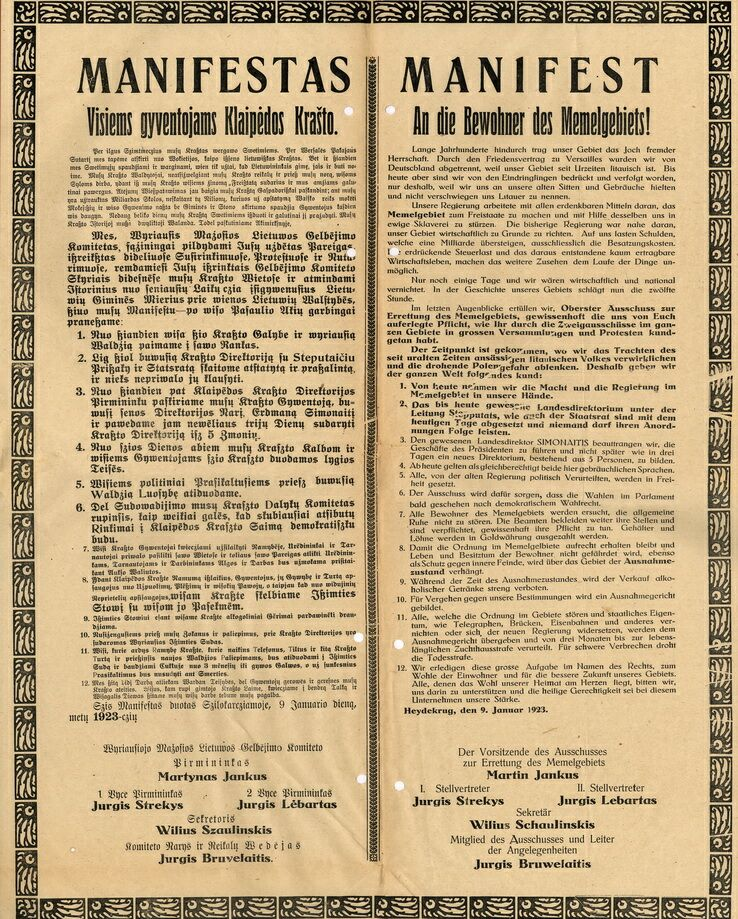
Bilingual manifest of January 9, 1923, whereby SCSLM proclaims itself the only governing power in the region

In late 1922, Lithuanian activists were sent to various towns and villages to deliver patriotic speeches and organize a number of pro-Lithuanian Committees for the Salvation of Lithuania Minor. On December 18, 1922, the Supreme Committee for the Salvation of Lithuania Minor (SCSLM), chaired by Martynas Jankus, was established in Klaipėda to unite all these committees. It was to lead the revolt and later organize a pro-Lithuanian regime in the region. According to Jankus testimony to the Conference of Ambassadors in March 1923, up to 8,000–10,000 persons (5–7% of the population) were united around the Committee before January 10, 1923. On January 3, 1923, a congress of the committees authorized SCSLM to represent the interest of the inhabitants of the entire region. However, at the time the organization was just a name and apart from issuing several declarations had no other activity. Some of its members admitted that they learned about their role in the SCSLM only after the revolt. On January 7, the SCSLM published a proclamation, Broliai Šauliai!, alleging that the Lithuanians were persecuted by foreigners, declaring its resolve to take up arms to rid itself of "slavery", and pleading the Lithuanian Riflemen's Union for help. This became the official pretext for the riflemen to enter into the region on January 9.

On January 9, the SCSLM declared that, based on the authorization from other salvation committees to represent all inhabitants of the region, the SCSLM usurped all power in the region, dissolved the Directorate, chaired by Vilius Steputaitis (Wilhelm Stepputat), and authorized Erdmonas Simonaitis to form a new five-member Directorate within 3 days. The declaration also provided that the German and Lithuanian language were given equal status as official languages of the region, all political prisoners were to be released, martial law was enacted. In addition to this declaration, the Committee issued a French appeal to the French soldiers, in which they, as "fighters for noble ideas of freedom and equality", were asked not to fight against the "will and achievements of the Lithuanian nation". On January 13, Simonaitis formed a new pro-Lithuanian Directorate, which included Vilius Gaigalaitis, Martynas Reizgys, Jonas Toleikis, and Kristupas Lekšas. On January 19, representatives of Committees for the Salvation of Lithuania Minor met in Šilutė (Heydekrug) and passed a five-point declaration, asking for the region to be incorporated as an autonomous district into Lithuania. The document was signed by some 120 people. The region's autonomy extended to local taxation, education, religion, court system, agriculture, social services. On January 24, the First Seimas (parliament of Lithuania) accepted the declaration thus formalizing the incorporation of the Klaipėda Region. Antanas Smetona was sent as the chief envoy to the region.

=== Military actions ===
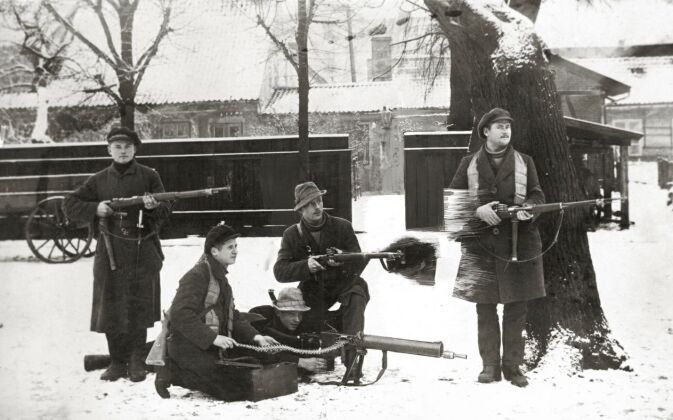
Lithuanian rebels dressed in civilian clothes

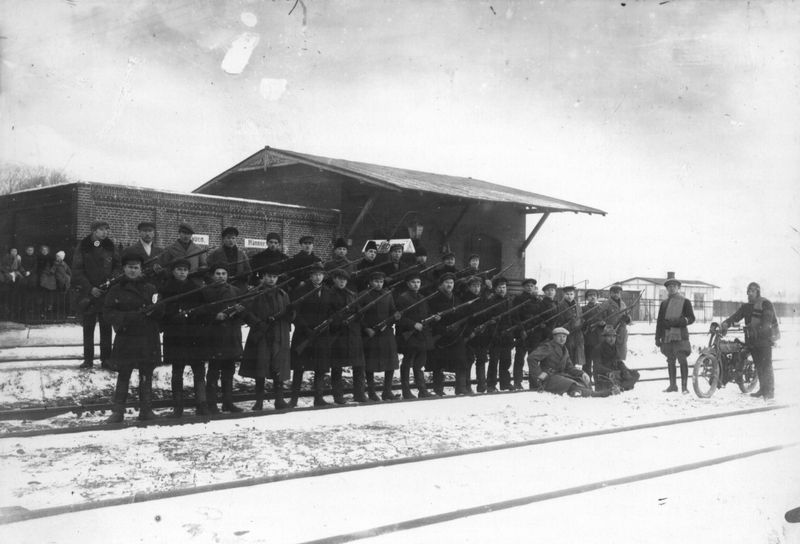
Lithuanian rebels at the railway station in Rimkai

Galvanauskas enlisted the paramilitary Lithuanian Riflemen's Union to provide manpower for the revolt. Vincas Krėvė-Mickevičius, chairman of the union, believed that the idea to organize the revolt originated within the organization and Galvanauskas only tacitly approved the plan while carefully distancing the government from the rebels. In December 1922, Krėvė-Mickevičius met with Reichswehr's commander Hans von Seeckt and was assured that German army would not interfere with the Lithuanian plans in the region. Krėvė-Mickevičius cheaply bought 1,500 guns, five light machine guns, and 1.5 million rounds of ammunition from the Germans. The military action was coordinated by Lithuanian counterintelligence officer and former Russian colonel Jonas Polovinskas, who changed his name to Jonas Budrys, which sounded more Prussian Lithuanian. Later his entire staff changed their last names to sound more Prussian Lithuanian. According to memoirs of Steponas Darius, the revolt was first scheduled for the night of the New Year, but the Lithuanian government pulled out based on a negative intelligence report. Supporters of the revolt gathered in Kaunas and convinced the government to proceed. The delay jeopardized the mission as the secret could have leaked to the Allies.

The revolt started on January 10, 1923. Arriving with trains to Kretinga and Tauragė, 1,090 volunteers (40 officers, 584 soldiers, 455 riflemen, three clerks, two doctors, six orderlies) crossed the border into the region. Among them were Steponas Darius and Vladas Putvinskis. They wore civilian clothes and had green armband with letters MLS for Mažosios Lietuvos sukilėlis or Mažosios Lietuvos savanoris (rebel/volunteer of Lithuania Minor). Each man had a rifle and 200 bullets; the rebels had a total of 21 light machine guns, four motorcycles, three cars, 63 horses. In hopes of negotiating a peaceful retreat of the French and to avoid any casualties, shooting was allowed only as a last resort of self-defense. Galvanauskas ordered perfect behavior (politeness, no plunder, no alcoholic drinks, no political speeches) and no Lithuanian identification (no Lithuanian documents, money, tobacco, or matchboxes). In the Klaipėda Region, these men were met by some 300 local volunteers, though Lithuanian historian Vygandas Vareikis disputed the accuracy of this assertion. More local men joined once the rebels reached cities. The rebels met little resistance, but struggled with cold winter weather, lack of transportation and basic supplies (they were not provided with food or clothes, but were given a daily allowance of 4000 German marks).

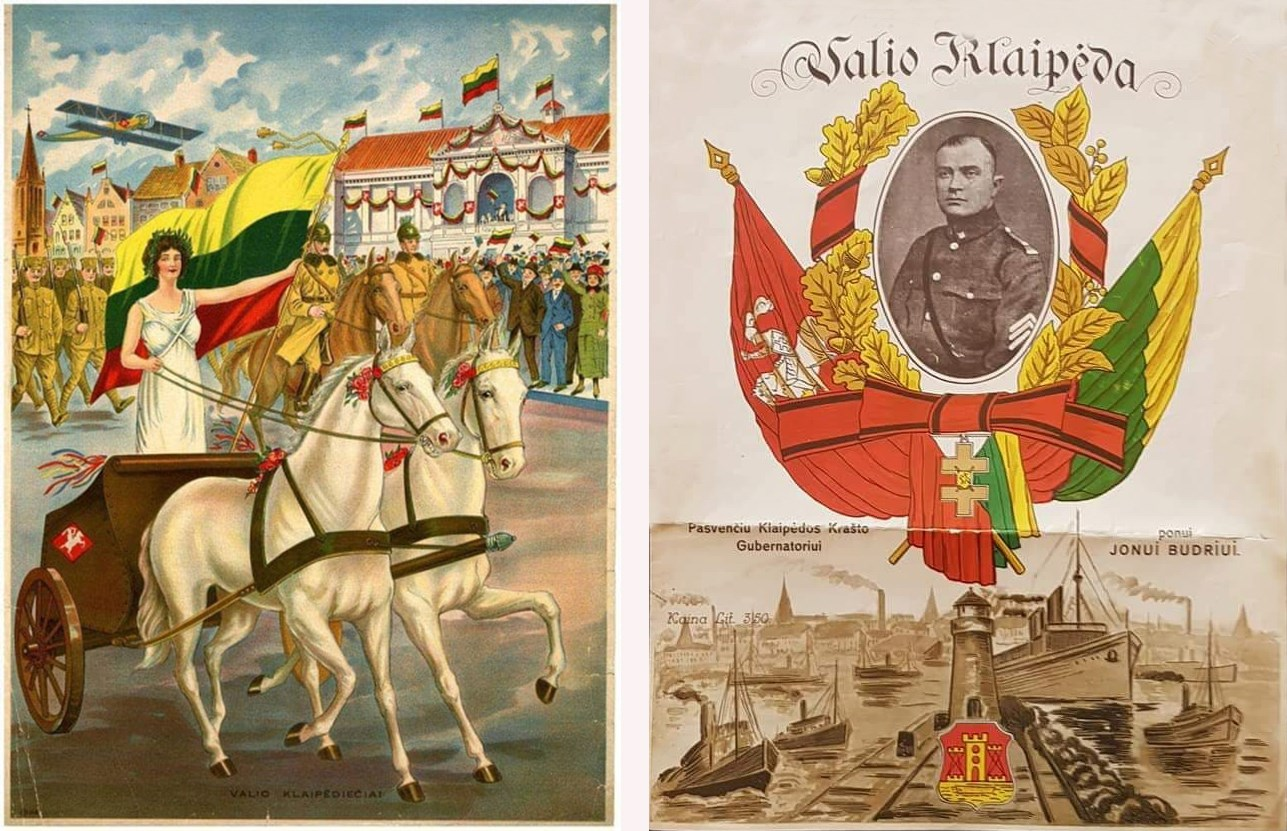
Lithuanian posters dedicated to Lithuanian military parade in front of the Klaipėda Drama Theatre (left) and to Jonas Budrys, the military leader of the Klaipėda Revolt (right)

The contingent was divided into three armed groups. The first and strongest group (530 men commanded by Major Jonas Išlinskas codename Aukštuolis) was ordered to take Klaipėda. The second group (443 men led by Captain Mykolas Kalmantavičius codename Bajoras) was sent to capture Pagėgiai (Pogegen) and secure the border with Germany and the third (103 men led by Major Petras Jakštas codename Kalvaitis) to Šilutė (Heydekrug). By January 11, the pro-Lithuanian forces controlled the region, except for the city of Klaipėda. The French administrator Pestiné refused to surrender and fighting over Klaipėda broke out on January 15. The city was defended by 250 French soldiers, 350 German policemen, and 300 civilian volunteers. After a brief gunfight, a ceasefire was signed by Pestiné and Budrys and the French soldiers were interned in their barracks. During the fighting, 12 insurgents, two French soldiers, and one German policeman were killed. According to German sources, one French soldier died and two were injured. On January 16, the Polish ship Komendant Piłsudski entered the port of Klaipėda carrying Colonel Eugène Trousson, a member of the French military mission in Poland, and reinforcements to French troops. However, the ship soon departed as the fighting was over and ceasefire was in effect. On January 17–18, the British cruiser HMS Caledon and two French torpedo boats, Algérien and Senégalais, reached Klaipėda. The French cruiser Voltaire was on its way. The Lithuanians began organizing a local army, which included 317 men by January 24. The men were enticed by a guaranteed six-month position and a wage of two litas a day.

== Reaction and aftermath ==
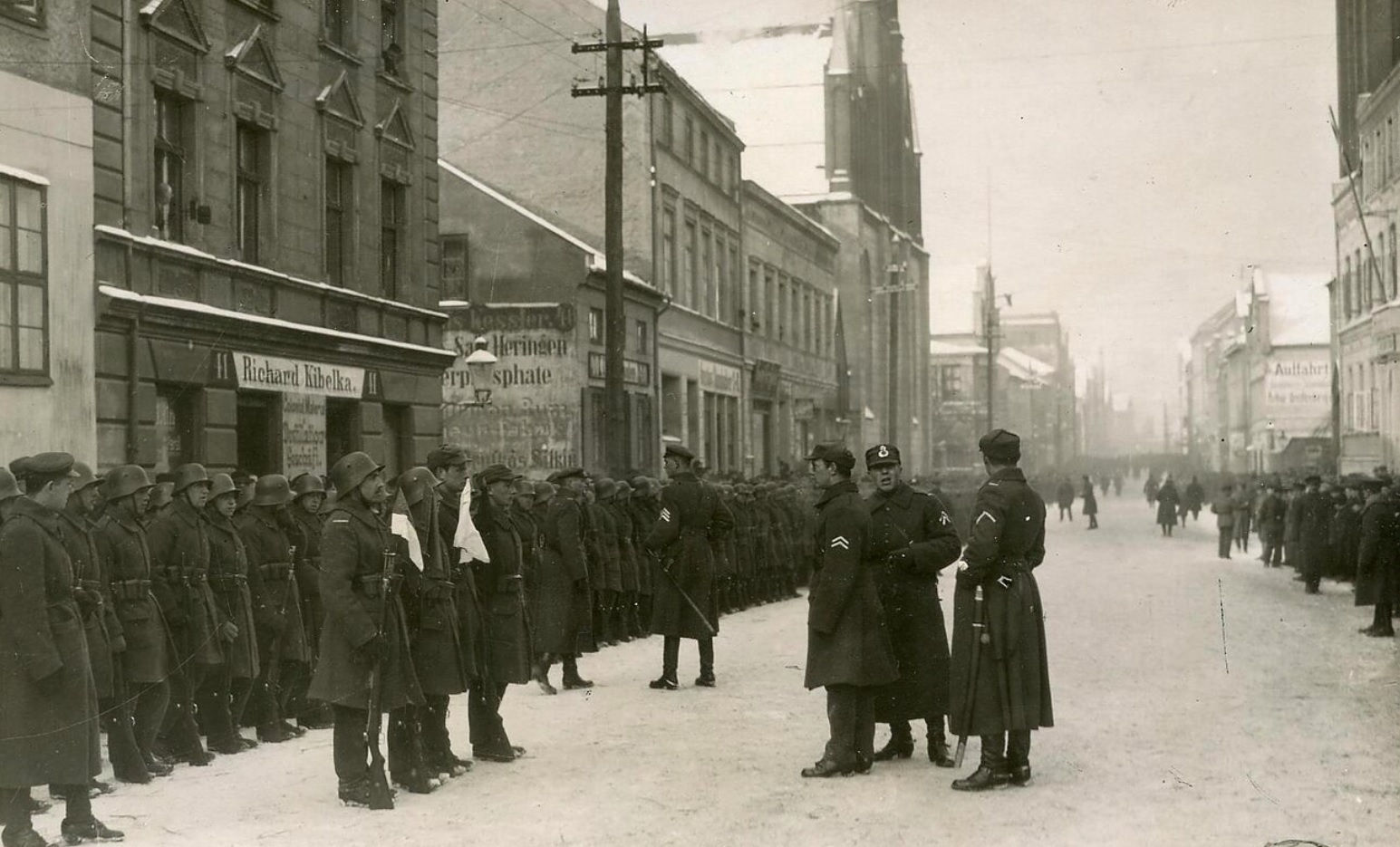
Lithuanian volunteers parade following the Klaipėda Revolt

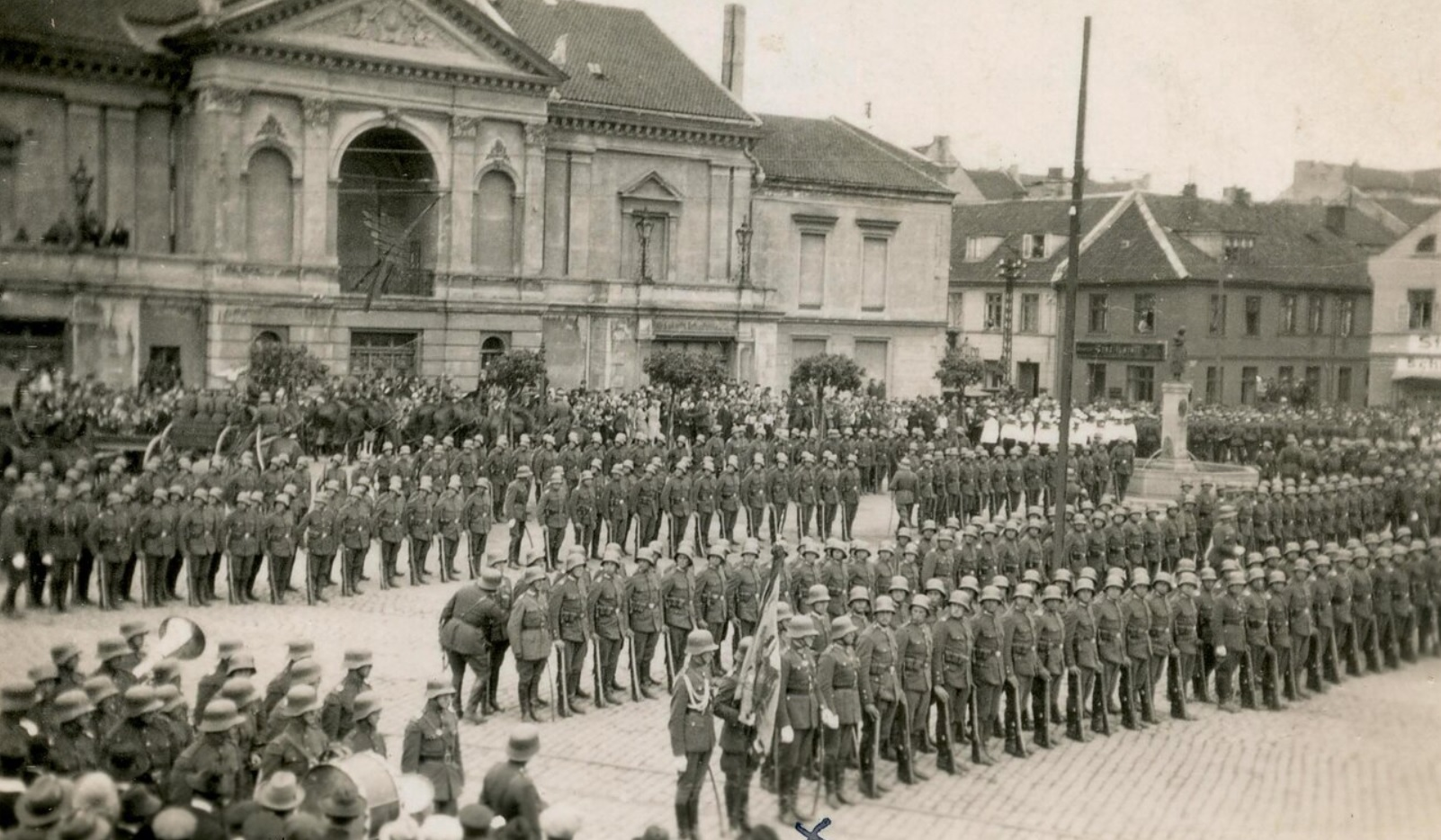
Lithuanian Army parade in Klaipėda Theatre Square in 1923

France protested against the Lithuanian actions and issued direct military threats demanding to return to the status quo ante bellum. Britain protested, but refrained from threats. It was suspected that Lithuania had Soviet support, which meant that if either France or Poland initiated a military response Soviet Russia would intervene, possibly causing another war. Poland protested, but also feared wider repercussions. It offered military assistance, but only if France and Britain approved. On January 17, 1923, the Conference of Ambassadors decided to dispatch a special commission, led by Frenchman Georges Clinchant. The commission with a handful of Allied troops arrived on January 26 and almost immediately demanded that the rebels withdraw from the region, threatening to use force, but quickly backed down. On January 29, the Allies rejected the proposal to send troops to quash the revolt. France wanted to restore its administration, but Britain and Italy supported the transfer of the region to Lithuania. On February 2, the Allies presented a sternly worded ultimatum demanding withdrawal of all rebels from the region, disbandment of any armed forces, Steponaitis' Directorate and the Supreme Committee for the Salvation of Lithuania Minor.

At the same time, the League was making its final decision regarding the bitter territorial dispute over the Vilnius Region between Poland and Lithuania. On February 3, the League decided to divide the 6 km (3.7 mi) wide neutral zone, established in the aftermath of the Żeligowski's Mutiny in November 1920. Despite Lithuanian protests, the division of the neutral zone proceeded on February 15. In these circumstances, the League decided on an unofficial exchange: Lithuania would receive the Klaipėda Region for the lost Vilnius Region. By February 4, the Allied ultimatum was replaced by a diplomatic note requesting that the transfer of the Klaipėda Region would be orderly and not coerced. On February 11, the Allies even thanked Lithuania for the peaceful resolution of the crisis. To further appease the League, the Simonaitis' Directorate was disbanded on February 15. Viktoras Gailius formed a provisional five-member Directorate, which included two Germans and three Prussian Lithuanians. On February 17, the Conference transferred the region to Lithuania under several conditions to be later formalized in the Klaipėda Convention: the region would be granted autonomy, Lithuania would compensate Allied costs of administration and assume German liabilities of war reparations, and the Neman River would be internationalized. Lithuania accepted and thus the revolt was legitimized. The French and British ships left the port on February 19.

Initially the proposed Klaipėda Convention reserved extensive rights for Poland to access, use, and govern the port of Klaipėda. This was completely unacceptable to Lithuania, which had terminated all diplomatic ties with Poland over the Vilnius Region. The stalled negotiations were referred to the League of Nations. The three-member commission, chaired by American Norman Davis, prepared the final convention which was signed by Great Britain, France, Italy, Japan, and Lithuania in May 1924. The Klaipėda Region became an autonomous region under unconditional sovereignty of Lithuania. The region had extensive legislative, judicial, administrative, and financial autonomy and elected its own local parliament. The port of Klaipėda was internationalized allowing freedom of transit. The convention was hailed as a major Lithuanian diplomatic victory as it contained none of the special rights initially reserved for Poland and placed no conditions on Lithuanian sovereignty in the region. However, the convention severely limited the powers of the Lithuanian government and caused frequent debates on the relationship between central and local authorities. In the 1920s, the relations between Lithuania and Germany under Foreign Minister Gustav Stresemann were rather normal. However, tensions began to rise after Adolf Hitler came to power. Weaknesses of the convention were exploited by Nazi Germany when it supported anti-Lithuanian activities and campaigned for reincorporation of the region into Germany. This culminated in a 1939 ultimatum, which successfully demanded that Lithuania give up the Klaipėda Region under threat of invasion.

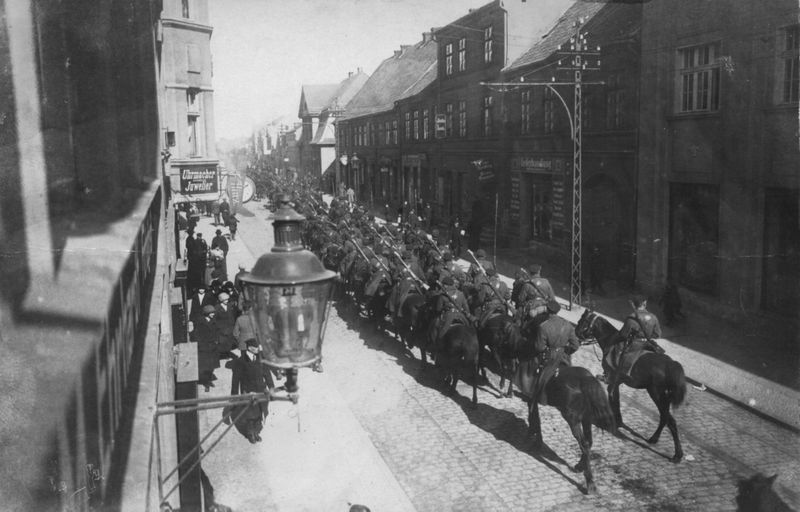
Soldiers of the Lithuanian Army riding horses in Klaipėda, 1923

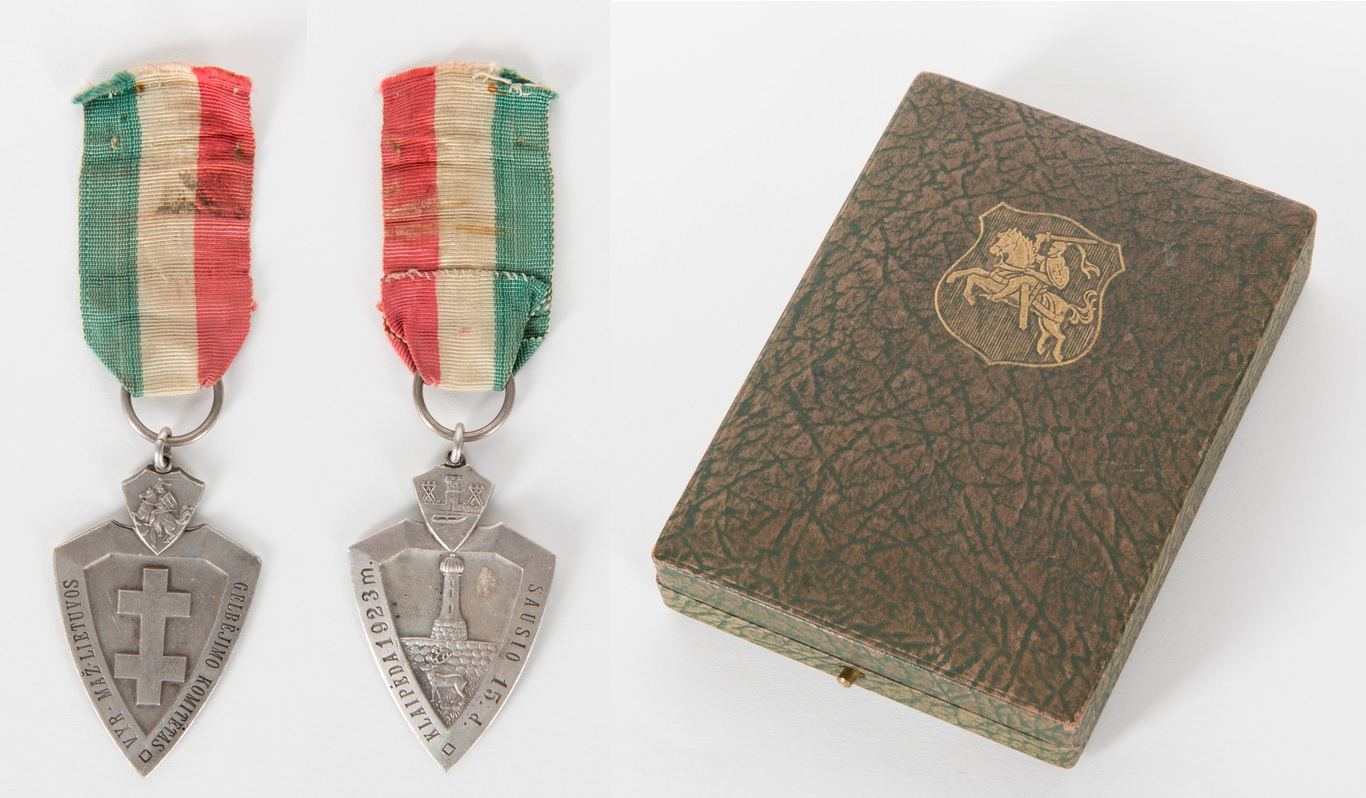
Lithuanian medal with a box dedicated to the Klaipėda Revolt, 1923

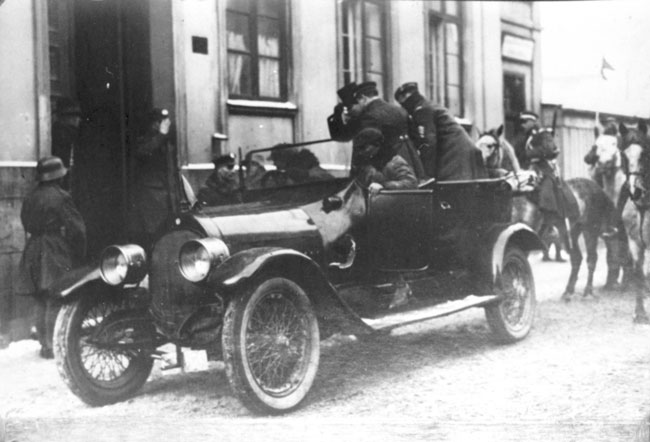
Uprising military commander Jonas Budrys, the High Commissioner, and the Lithuanian Army officers arrive in Klaipėda in 1923

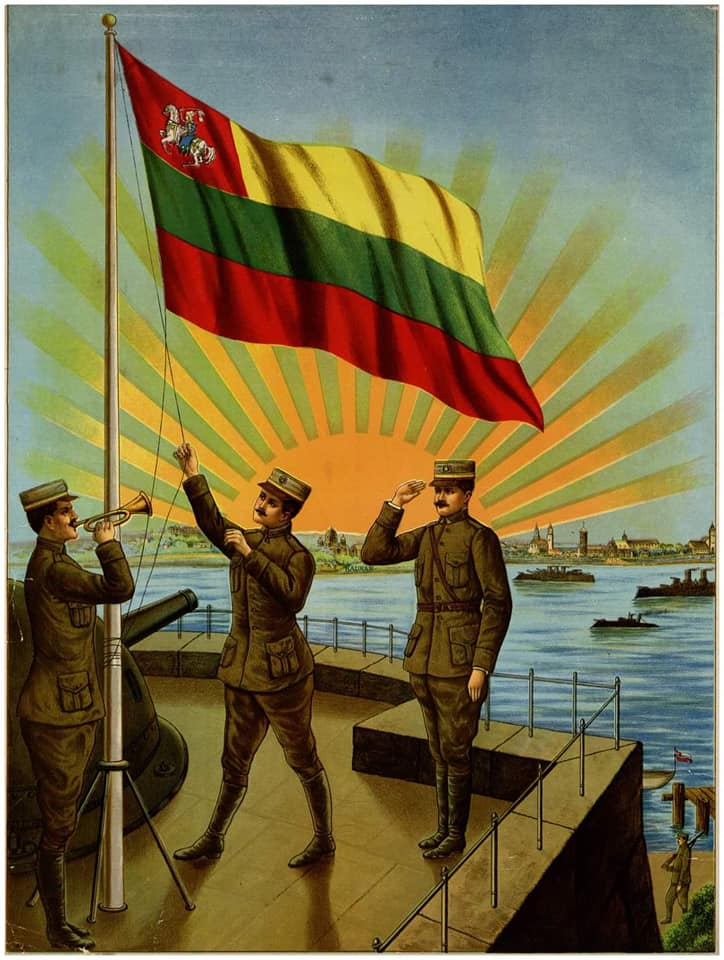
Lithuanian Americans poster, 1923

== Bibliography ==
- Bühler, Phillip A. (1990). The Oder-Neisse Line: a reappraisal under international law. East European monographs. Vol. 227. Columbia University Press. ISBN 978-0-88033-174-6.
- Čepas, Vytautas (January 2008). "Speech by Seimas member Vytautas Čepas" (PDF). Lithuanian Parliamentary Mirror. 1 (123). ISSN 1392-3528. Archived from the original (PDF) on 2011-07-22.
- Cienciala, Anna; Komarnicki, Titus (1984). From Versailles to Locarno: Keys to Polish Foreign Policy, 1919–25. University Press of Kansas. ISBN 0-7006-0247-X.
- Eidintas, Alfonsas; Žalys, Vytautas; Senn, Alfred Erich (1999). Lithuania in European Politics: The Years of the First Republic, 1918–1940 (Paperback ed.). New York: St. Martin's Press. ISBN 0-312-22458-3.
- Gerutis, Albertas, ed. (1984). Lithuania: 700 Years. Translated by Budreckis, Algirdas (6th ed.). New York: Manyland Books. ISBN 0-87141-028-1. LCCN 75-80057.
- Walters, F. P. (1952). A History of the League of Nations. Oxford University Press.

=== Other languages ===
- Butkevičius, Algirdas (2010-05-17). "Nepalaužtas kančių ir neteisybės". Šiaurės rytai (in Lithuanian). ISSN 1392-9240. Archived from the original on 2011-07-22.
- Čepėnas, Pranas (1986). Naujųjų laikų Lietuvos istorija (in Lithuanian). Vol. II. Chicago: Dr. Kazio Griniaus Fondas. OCLC 3220435.
- Clinchant, Georges; Aloisi, Pompeo; Fry, Basil Homfray (1923). "Rapport adressé à la Conférence des ambassadeurs par la Commission extraordinaire de Memel" (PDF). Question de Memel: documents diplomatiques (in French). Vol. 1. Kaunas: République de Lithuanie. Ministére des Affaires Étrangères. OCLC 14979637.
- Gliožaitis, Algirdas Antanas (2003a). "Klaipėdos kraštas". Mažosios Lietuvos enciklopedija (in Lithuanian). Vol. 2. Vilnius: Mokslo ir enciklopedijų leidybos institutas. ISBN 5-420-01470-X.
- Gliožaitis, Algirdas Antanas (2003b). "Klaipėdos krašto konvencija". Mažosios Lietuvos enciklopedija (in Lithuanian). Vol. 2. Vilnius: Mokslo ir enciklopedijų leidybos institutas. ISBN 5-420-01470-X.
- Gliožaitis, Algirdas Antanas; Šukienė, Roma (2009). "Šilutės seimo deklaracija". Mažosios Lietuvos enciklopedija (in Lithuanian). Vol. 4. Vilnius: Mokslo ir enciklopedijų leidybos institutas. ISBN 978-5-420-01470-7.
- Jurgėla, Petras (1990) [1935]. Sparnuoti lietuviai Darius ir Girėnas (in Lithuanian). Vilnius: Lietuvos žurnalistų sąjunga. OCLC 23442034.
- Kažukauskas, Vytautas (January 2003). "Visa Lietuvių tauta atsiėmė Klaipėdą". Vytautai (in Lithuanian). 1. Archived from the original on 2011-09-28.
- Liekis, Šarūnas (2010). 1939: the year that changed everything in Lithuania's history. On the boundary of two worlds. Vol. 20. Rodopi. ISBN 978-90-420-2762-6.
- Lukšas, Aras (2009-01-16). "Klaipėdos sukilimas: faktai ir versijos". Lietuvos žinios (in Lithuanian). 12 (12239). ISSN 1822-1637. Archived from the original on 2011-07-22.
- Migliorini, Elio (1937). Finlandia e stati Baltici (in Italian). Istituto per l'Europa Orientale. OCLC 23508134.
- Safronovas, Vasilijus (2009a). "Der Anschluss des Memelgebietes an Litauen" (PDF). Annaberger Annalen (in German). 17. ISSN 0949-3484.
- Safronovas, Vasilijus (2009b). "Vyriausias Mažosios Lietuvos gelbėjimo komitetas". Mažosios Lietuvos enciklopedija (in Lithuanian). Vol. 4. Vilnius: Mokslo ir enciklopedijų leidybos institutas. ISBN 978-5-420-01470-7.
- Senn, Alfred Erich (1966). The Great Powers, Lithuania and the Vilna Question 1920–1928. Studies in East European history. Vol. 11. E.J. Brill. OCLC 398265.
- Šilas, Vytautas (2003). "Klaipėdos krašto sukilimas". Mažosios Lietuvos enciklopedija (in Lithuanian). Vol. 2. Vilnius: Mokslo ir enciklopedijų leidybos institutas. ISBN 5-420-01470-X.
- Turčinavičius, Vladas (2010-01-21). "Drąsiausias Lietuvos politinis–karinis žygis". Mažoji Lietuva. ISSN 2029-3542. Archived from the original on 2011-07-22.
- Vaitiekūnas, Vytautas (December 1957). "The Continuity of Lithuania's Statehood". Lituanus. 4 (13). ISSN 0024-5089. Archived from the original on 2021-07-09.
- Vareikis, Vygandas (2000). "Die Rolle des Schützenbundes Litauens bei der Besetzung des Memelgebietes 1923" (PDF). Annaberger Annalen (in German). 8. ISSN 0949-3484.
- Vareikis, Vygandas (2008). "Sukilėliai, šauliai, savanoriai" (PDF). Acta Historica Universitatis Klaipedensis (in Lithuanian). XVII. ISSN 1392-4095. Archived from the original (PDF) on 2011-07-22.
- Vareikis, Vygandas (2009). "Klaipėdos krašto užėmimas: dokumentai prieš mitus". Kultūros barai (in Lithuanian). 2. ISSN 0134-3106.
- Žostautaitė, Petronėlė (1992). Klaipėdos kraštas: 1923–1939 (in Lithuanian). Mokslas. ISBN 978-5-420-00724-2.
