= Jonas Budrys =

Lithuanian counterintelligence officer, soldier, and diplomat

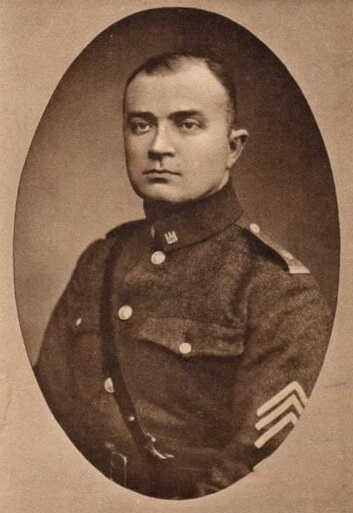
- Budrys with uniform of the Lithuanian Armed Forces
- Born: Jonas Polovinskas; 10 May 1889; Kaunas, Kovno Governorate, Russian Empire (now Kaunas, Lithuania)
- Died: 11 September 1964 (aged 75); New York City, U.S.
- Burial place: Lithuanian National Cemetery
- Children: Algis Budrys (1931–2008)
- Military career
- Allegiance: Russian Empire (1915–1917); White Army (1918–1919); Lithuania (1921–1924)
- Branch: Counterintelligence
- Service years: 1915–1918; 1921–1924
- Units: 5th Army (Russian Empire); 19th Army Corps (Russian Empire); Amur Military District (White Army); Ypatingos paskirties rinktinė
- Conflicts: World War I Russian Civil War; Klaipėda Revolt
- Other work: Consul of Lithuania (1928–1964)

Jonas Budrys (born Jonas Polovinskas, 10 May 1889 – 11 September 1964) was a counterintelligence officer and later a Lithuanian diplomat. He is best known as the commander of Lithuanian forces during the Klaipėda Revolt in January 1923. The region was a League of Nations mandate administered by the French. Budrys led a small Lithuanian military force into the region and successfully took control. Klaipėda was incorporated into Lithuania as an autonomous region. After the revolt, Budrys served as Lithuania's representative to the region and its first governor until 1925. He was later Lithuanian consul to East Prussia and New York City. His son, Algis Budrys, became a science fiction writer.

== Early life ==
Polovinskas was born in Kaunas in 1889 but grew up on a nearby farm. Perhaps due to the sensitive nature of future Polovinskas' career, very little is known about his family or early life. His son Algis never learned his paternal grandfather's name but believes he was also a Russian intelligence officer. Polovinskas was a member of the choir of the Lithuanian Daina Society in 1900–1905 and graduated from Kaunas gymnasium in 1907. In 1910, he was conscripted to the Imperial Russian Army and served in the 16th Mingrelian Grenadier Regiment of the Caucasus Grenadier Division. In 1912–1915, he worked as an assistant of a uyezd governor in the Courland Governorate.

== Career ==
=== Counterintelligence ===
After the outbreak of World War I in 1914, Polovinskas was mobilized to the Imperial Russian Army and was assigned to the counterintelligence section of the General Staff of the 5th Army. At the same time, he was sent to counterintelligence courses. After graduation, he became commander of the counterintelligence unit of the 19th Army Corps. After the Russian Revolution, he was reassigned to the Far East.

In 1918, he was counterintelligence commander of the White Army's Amur Military District (see Siberian Army) with the rights of a brigade commander. He also briefly studied at the Oriental Institute in Vladivostok in 1920–1921. When the Bolsheviks captured the territory, he retreated to China and returned to Lithuania in July 1921. It was a long and difficult journey and Polovinskas suffered a bout of typhoid fever.

Immediately upon his return, Polovinskas was offered a job with the Lithuanian counterintelligence. On 21 July 1921, he became commander of the counterintelligence section of the General Staff of the Lithuanian Army. During his tenure, Polovinskas discovered the so-called saccharin scandal – smuggling of foodstuffs to Soviet Russia in diplomatic packages which led to the resignation of Minister of Foreign Affairs Juozas Purickis in December 1921.

=== Klaipėda Revolt ===
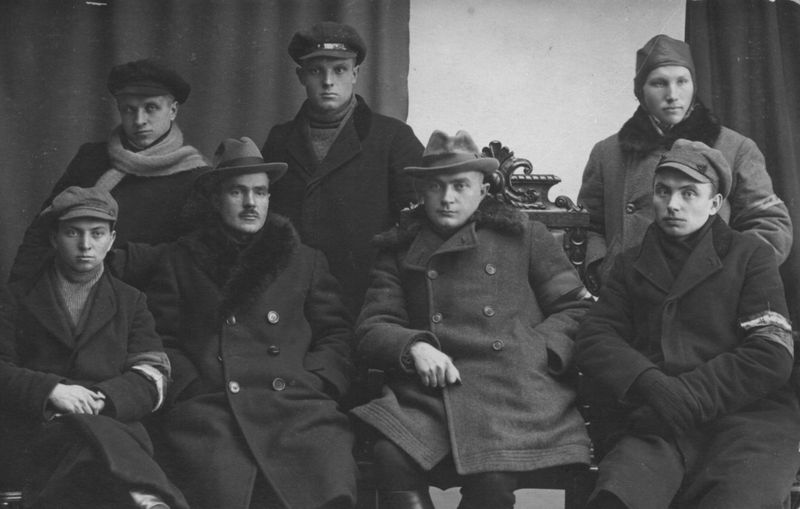
Budrys (sitting in the middle) with other commanders of the Klaipėda Revolt

In 1922, the government of Ernestas Galvanauskas sent him to the Klaipėda Region to determine opinions of local residents on joining the region with Lithuania. After many Lithuanian officers refused to lead the rebellion, Polovinskas became the military leader of the Klaipėda Revolt. He changed his last name to Budrys so it would sound more Prussian Lithuanian. He commanded the "Ypatingosios paskirties rinktinė" (Special Purpose Force), which was formed in Kaunas and marched into the Klaipėda Region in early January 1923. After taking control of Klaipėda on 16 January, he organized a local army from the inhabitants of the region.

On 17 January, Budrys became the deputy of Antanas Smetona, the Lithuanian government's representative to the Klaipėda Region. When the French Army retreated from the region on 19 February, Budrys declared he was taking over the position of the previous French commissioner. When Smetona resigned as the Lithuanian representative in April 1923, Budrys became the de facto representative of Lithuania in the Klaipėda Region. By the president's decree of 21 October 1924, Budrys was appointed as the first governor of the Klaipėda Region. However, after the failure of Lithuanian parties in the first elections to the Parliament of the Klaipėda Region in November 1925, Budrys resigned from the governor's role.

=== Consul in Germany and New York ===
On 12 January 1927, Budrys became the chief of the Lithuanian Political Police (predecessor of the State Security Department of Lithuania) under the Ministry of Internal Affairs. Taking the post soon after the December 1926 coup d'état, he helped President Antanas Smetona to establish his authoritarian regime and suppress any counter-coups. For example, he dealt with the anti-government Tauragė Revolt in September 1927. He also dealt with one of the most prominent espionage cases in interwar Lithuania. The Political Police discovered that retired General Konstantinas Kleščinskis was spying for the Soviet Russia. Kleščinskis was arrested and executed in May 1927.

Budrys resigned from the police on 1 January 1928 and was appointed as Lithuania's consul in Königsberg. In November 1933, he became the consul general of Lithuania in East Prussia. Due to the rise of Nazi rhetoric and increased attacks against him, Budrys asked for a reassignment. On 11 November 1936, Budrys was appointed the consul general of Lithuania in New York City. Despite the Soviet occupation of Lithuania in June 1940, the consulate continued to function as a diplomatic representative of independent pre-war Lithuania thus preserving legal state continuity of Lithuania. The family also owned a chicken farm in rural New Jersey. Budrys continued to serve as the consul until his death from a heart attack in 1964. He was buried in the Lithuanian National Cemetery in Chicago. His gravestone depicts the coat of arms of Klaipėda, stylized sea waves, and the Jagiellon Cross.

In New York, Budrys published English-language Short Economic Outline of Lithuania (1938). His memoirs about his counterintelligence work in 1921–1923 were published posthumously in Brooklyn and Hartford (1967) and republished in Lithuania in 1991.

== Awards ==
Budrys received the following awards.

=== Lithuanian honours ===
- Order of the Cross of Vytis
  - 2nd type 1st class (1922)
  - 1st type 3rd class (1927)
- Silver Medal of the Liberation of Klaipėda (1925)
- Order of the Lithuanian Grand Duke Gediminas, 3rd class (1933)
- Riflemen's Star (1933)
- Riflemen's Medal (1939)

=== Foreign honours ===
- Order of Saint Anna, 3rd class with swords
- Order of Saint Stanislaus, 3rd class with swords
- Honorary citizen of New York City (1940)
