= Rimkai =

- Village
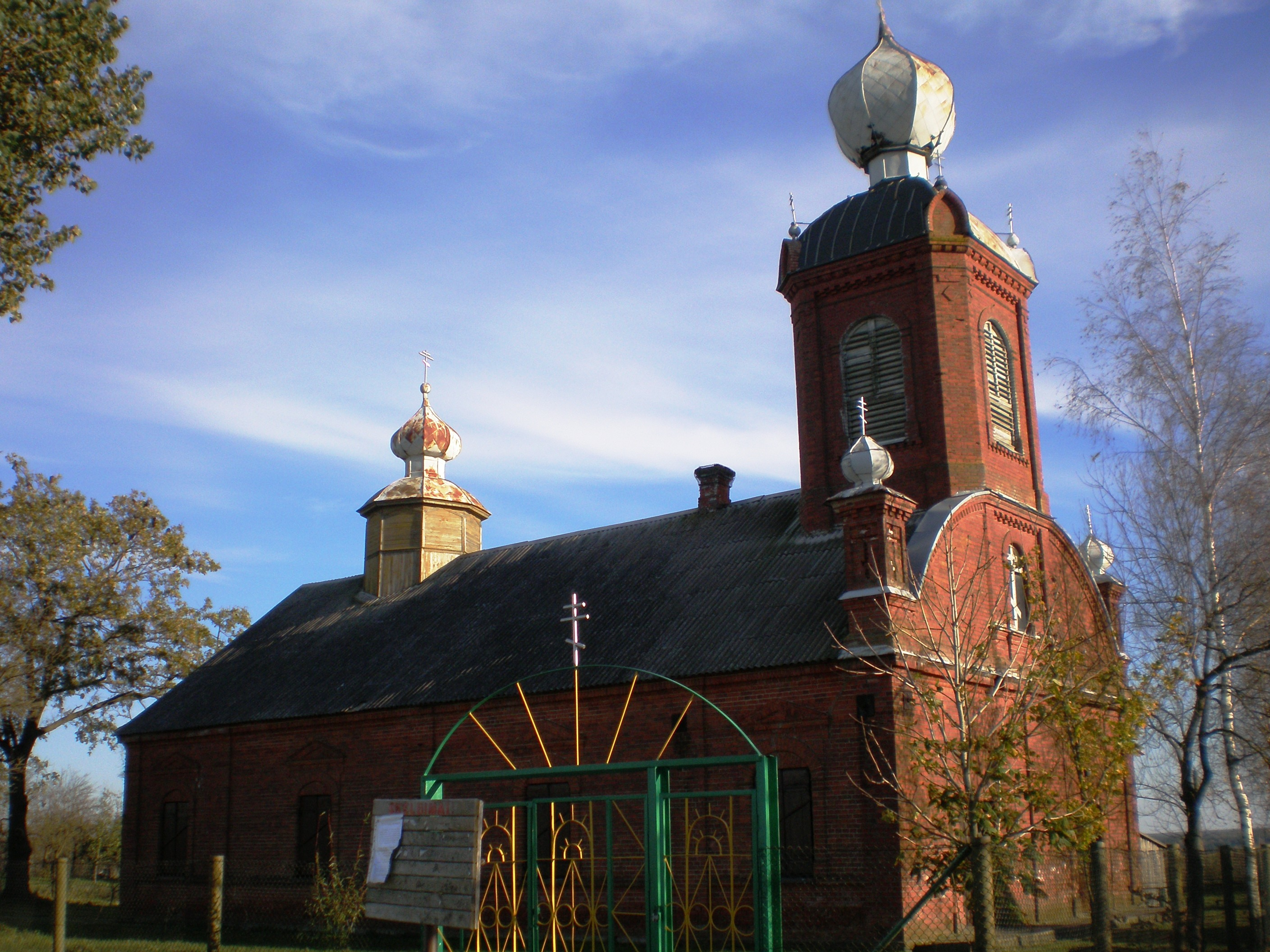
- Church of Old Believers in Rimkai

- Location of Rimkai
- Coordinates: 55°04′19″N 24°13′52″E
- Country: Lithuania
- County: Kaunas County
- Municipality: Jonava district municipality
- Eldership: Kulva eldership

Population (2001)
  - Total: 80
- Time zone: UTC+2 (EET)
  - Summer (DST): UTC+3 (EEST)

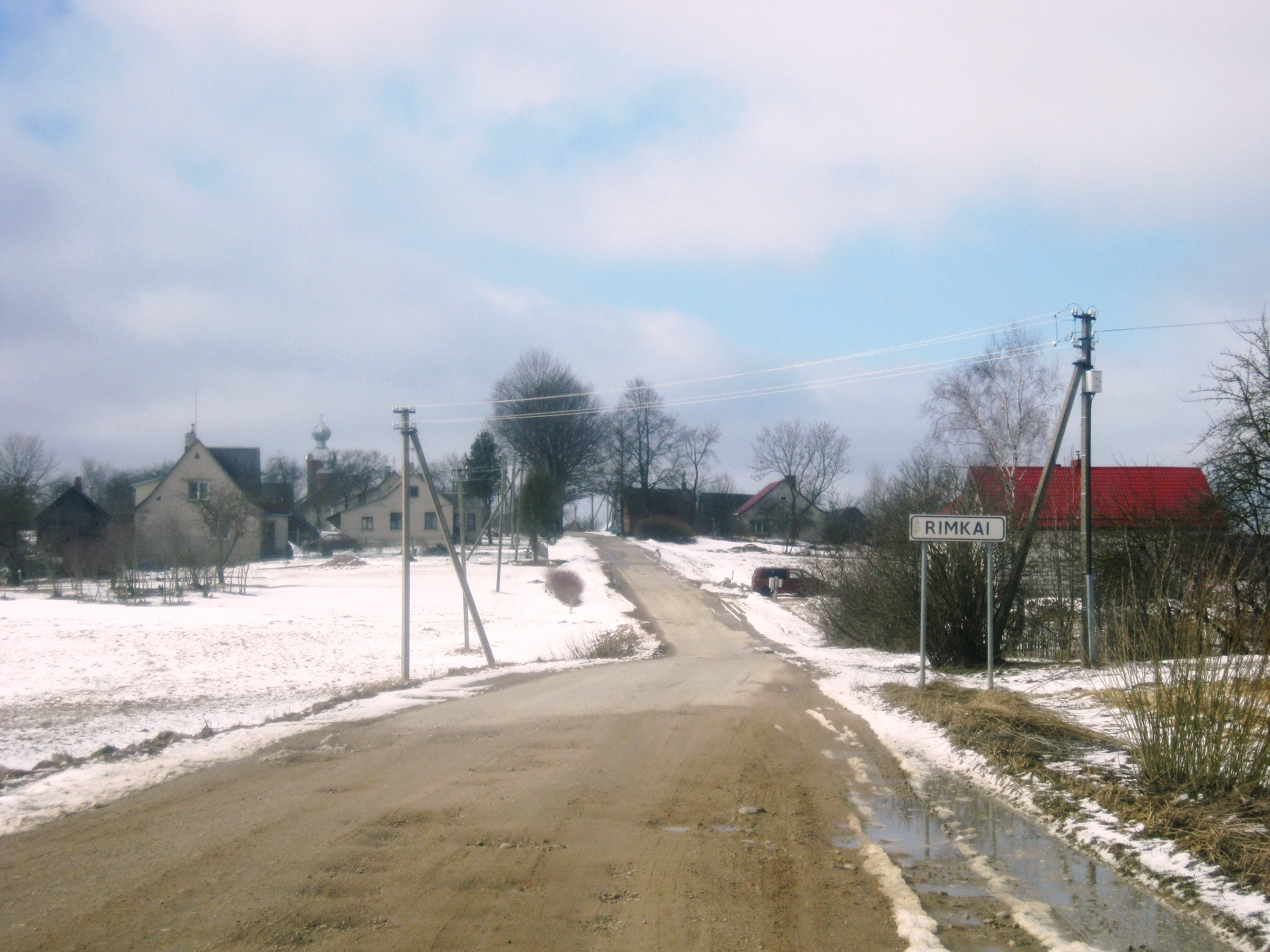
Rimkai

Rimkai is a village in Jonava district municipality, Kaunas County, central Lithuania. According to the 2001 census, the village has a population of 80 people. The village has a church of Old Believers.
