= Conference of Ambassadors =

Post-war organization of WWI Allies (1920–1931)

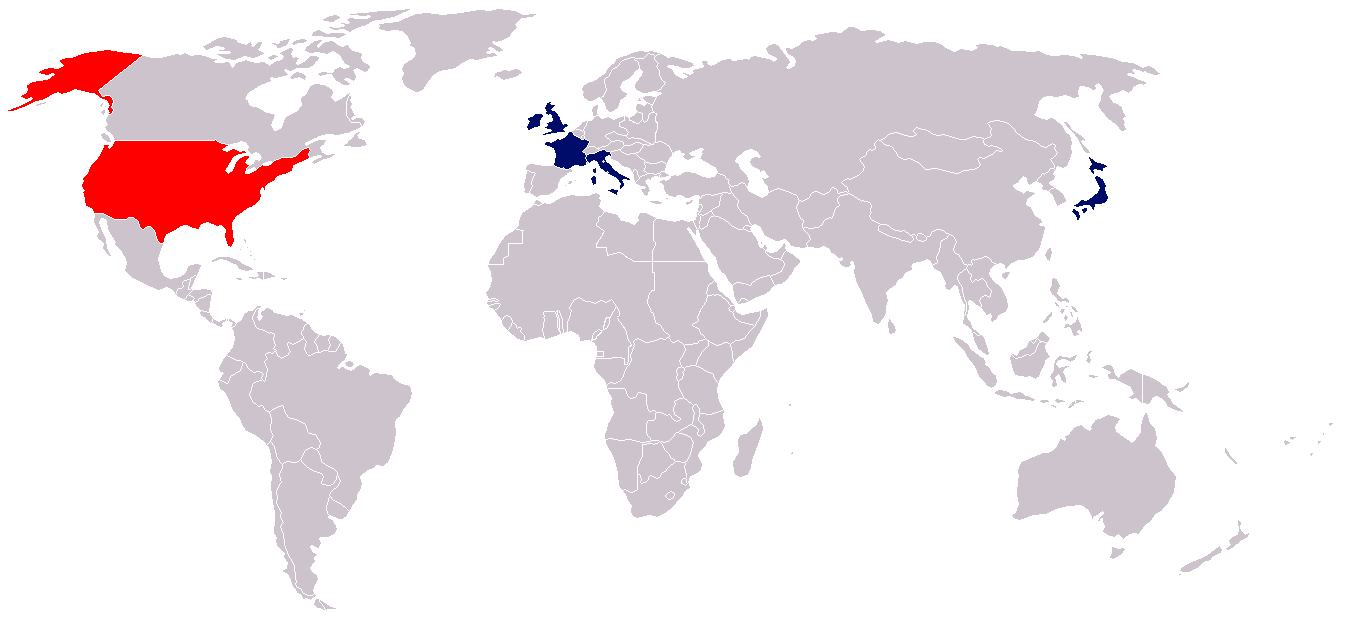
Council of Ambassadors members (in blue) and observers (in red) as of 1919

The Conference of Ambassadors of the Principal Allied and Associated Powers was an inter-allied organization of the Entente in the period following the end of World War I. Formed in Paris in January 1920 it became a successor of the Supreme War Council and was later on de facto incorporated into the League of Nations as one of its governing bodies. It became less active after the Locarno Treaties of 1925 and formally ceased to exist in 1931 or 1935.

== Composition ==
The Conference consisted of ambassadors of the United Kingdom, Italy, and Japan accredited in Paris and French minister of foreign affairs. The ambassador of the United States attended as an observer because the United States was not an official party to the Treaty of Versailles. French diplomat René Massigli was its secretary-general for its entire existence. It was chaired by the French foreign ministers, among them Georges Clemenceau, Raymond Poincaré and Aristide Briand.

Jules Laroche and Massigli were the first two secretaries-general. A series of committees and commissions worked as permanent or sometimes ad hoc advisers to the secretaries-general.

== History ==
It was formed to enforce peace treaties and to mediate various territorial disputes among European states. Some of the disputed regions handled by the Conference included Cieszyn Silesia (between Poland and Czechoslovakia), the Vilnius Region (between Poland and Lithuania), the Klaipėda Region (between Germany and Lithuania) and the Corfu Incident (between Italy and Greece). One of its major territorial decisions was made on 15 March 1923, in recognizing the eastern borders of Poland created following the Polish–Soviet War of 1920. The Conference also recognized Polish sovereignty over the Vilnius region and Eastern Galicia.

At its March 1925 meeting held at the French War Ministry (Quai D'Orsay) in Paris, Marshal Foch gave a briefing on the state of German disarmament. He said:

- The old Imperial German Staff still existed.
- That German's army was at 500,000 men, not the 100,000 level required by the Treaty of Versailles.
- That war materials in excess of the treaty's requirement was found.
- That the German government passed no legislation limiting the size of its armed forces, as required by the peace treaty, and
- That the German police force (150,000 men) was kept on a military footing.

In response, Foch asked that a treaty of security be signed between France and the United Kingdom. Lord Crewe, the British ambassador, blocked further discussion on the subject.

== See also ==
- American Commission to Negotiate Peace
- League of Nations mandate
