= Social Democratic Party of the Memel Territory =

German political party between 1925-35

Social Democratic Party of the Memel Territory Sozialdemokratische Partei des Memelgebietes
- Founded: 1925
- Dissolved: 1935
- Split from: Social Democratic Party of Germany
- Newspaper: Memelländische Volkszeitung
- Ideology: Social democracy
- Parliament of the Klaipėda Region (1925): 5 / 29

The Social Democratic Party of the Memel Territory (German: Sozialdemokratische Partei des Memelgebietes) was a social democratic political party in the Memel Territory/Klaipėda Region 1925–1935. The party was led by August Kislat and Fritz Matzies. The party was based amongst the ethnic German population of the territory.

== Separation from German Social Democracy ==
The foundation of the party followed the coming into force of the Memel Convention and the Memel Statute on 25 August 1925, after which the labour movement in the Memel Territory detached itself organizationally from the German labour movement. The party was founded on the basis of the erstwhile organization of the Social Democratic Party of Germany in the area. Parallel to the foundation the Social Democratic Party of the Memel Territory, an independent Memel trade union movement was created (Gewerkschaftsbund des Memelgebiets). The party was divided into four district organizations (Kreisverbände): Memel-Stadt, Memel-Land, Heydekrug and Pogegen. The social base of the party differed significantly between the four districts. In Memel city (i.e. present-day Klaipėda) the party had a strong support amongst industrial and port workers. In the Memel-Land district there was representation of industrial, agricultural and commercial workers. In Pogegen, a rural area, party members were predominately agricultural labourers.

== First election ==
The party contested the first elections to the Parliament of the Klaipėda Region, held on 19 October 1925. The party formed a Unity Front together with the two other main German parties, the Memel Agricultural Party and the Memel People's Party. Together these three parties won 27 out of 29 seats in the regional parliament. The main opponents of the social democrats were the Greater Lithuanian nationalists. The Social Democratic Party obtained 10,010 votes (16%) and 5 seats. The elected parliamentarians of the party were August Kislat (Trade union secretary, Heydekrug), Adolf Plennis (Agricultural worker, Truschellen), Michel Bertschus (Chairman of the Union of War Wounded, Memel), Ernst Rausch (Worker, Übermemel) and Martin Seewaldt (Secretary of Gewerkschaftsbund des Memelgebiets, Memel).

== 1926–1927 elections and Martial Law ==
The party contested the 1926 Lithuanian parliamentary election. The party won 13.27% of the votes in Memel Territory/Klaipėda Region but failed to win any seat. The vote for the list of the party dipped to 5,712 votes (10.4%) in the 30 August 1927 election to the Parliament of the Klaipėda Region. Three parliamentarians were re-elected; Kislat, Bertschus and Seewaldt. The declaration of Martial Law in 1926 made party activities more complex.

== 1930s ==
In the 1930s the party revived the publication of Memelländische Volkszeitung ('Memel Land People's Newspaper'), a publication founded in 1924. The party obtained 6,780 votes (13.7%) in the 10 October 1930 Parliament of the Klaipėda Region election. The party gained four seats in the parliament; held by Michel Bertschus, August Jöres, Georg Pannars and Eugen Urban.

As the political situation in the area became increasingly difficult, the party faced competition from National Socialist tendencies. In the fourth Parliament of the Klaipėda Region election, the last contested by the party, held on 4 May 1932, the party obtained 5,104 votes (7.7%). Pannars and Jöres were re-elected. Jöres renounced his seat on 26 May 1932 and was replaced by Kislat.

The party dissolved into the Memel Unity List in 1935.

== See also ==
- Memeler Volksstimme
