= Heinrich Buttkereit =

Heinrich Buttkereit (1884–1947) was an ethnic German politician in Lithuania. Buttkereit was born on 23 April 1884 in Ruß. He was a farmer from Ruß. In the 1932 election to the parliament of the Klaipėda Region, he stood as candidate number 26 on the list of the Memel Agricultural Party. He was not elected in 1932, but on 13 September 1934 he filled one of seats in the assembly that had been left vacant. He remained a member of the regional parliament until the 1935 elections.

He is not to be confused with Heinrich Buttkereit from Pelėnai, who was Buttkereit's older cousin and who was elected to the parliament of the Klaipėda Region in 1932.

In December 1934 he was named Regional Director in the Directorate of the Klaipėda Region of Jurgis Brūvelaitis. He held this post until 15 July 1935.

Buttkereit died in Soviet captivity in Vilnius, April 1947.
