= George Waschkies =

Lithuanian politician

Member of the Lithuanian Parliament for Klaipėda Region
- In office 1926–1927

Personal details
- Born: August 22, 1875 Ußlöknen, Province of Prussia, German Empire
- Died: April 26, 1954 (aged 78) Bremen, West Germany
- Resting place: Bremen-Lesum chapel 53°10′18″N 8°41′27″E
- Party: Memel Agricultural Party
- Occupation: Farmer

Military service
- Years of service: 1897–1900
- Unit: 12th Lithuanian Uhlan Regiment, Imperial Germany Army

George Waschkies (Lithuanian: Jurgis Vaškys, August 22, 1875 – April 26, 1954) was an ethnic German politician in Lithuania. Waschkies was a farmer from Ußlöknen, East Prussia, who represented the Memel Agricultural Party in the Lithuanian parliament for a short stint in 1926–27.

== Youth ==
Waschkies was born on August 22, 1875, in Ußlöknen (Užliekniai). He attended school in his home village and worked at his father's farm following his confirmation. Waschkies did military service 1897–1900 in the 12th Lithuanian Uhlan Regiment. Waschkies took over the family farm after his father's death in 1903, but had to sell the property soon thereafter. He married in 1904 and moved to his wife's town of Blausden (Blauzdžiai). The couple had 14 children; as of 1927 eleven were alive.

== Career ==
Waschkies was one of the founders of the Wießen (Vyžiai) Credit Association in 1907. In 1912 he was named director of the association. In January 1916 he was named juror, and in 1917 he was named church warden. In 1919 he became a member of the Heydekrug town council and in 1924 a member of the town board. In 1919 he took charge as parish superintendent in Wießen and in July 1925 he became a parish council member.

Waschkies was elected to the Third Seimas of Lithuania in the June 1926 parliamentary election as a Memel Agricultural Party candidate in the Klaipėda Region constituency. The Seimas was dismissed in April 1927.

He was a member of the Parliament of the Klaipėda Region 1932–1934. On July 26, 1934, he took charge as acting vice speaker of the assembly. He was removed from the assembly in August 1934. His seat was left vacant. In September 1935, during the local elections, 14 men, including Waschkies, attacked the election officials and smashed the ballot box in Juknaičiai. On October 13, 1936, the appeal court found the men guilty and sentenced Waschkies to 11 months imprisonment.

== World War II and later period ==
Waschkies became a member of the NSDAP or Nazi Party on April 1, 1939. He was a member of the Wiesenheide local unit of the party. After the war he moved to Bremen, where he died on April 26, 1954. He was buried at Bremen-Lesum chapel on April 30, 1954.
