= Adolf Plennis =

German politician (1894–1949)

Adolf Plennis (6 August 1894 – 12 May 1949) was a Memel German politician.

Plennis was born Daugallen-Peter on 6 August 1894. He worked as an agricultural worker and lived in Truschellen. He was also an organizer of the Agricultural Workers Union of the Memel Territory.

Plennis was elected to the first Memel Territory Assembly in 1925, being the third candidate on the list of the Social Democratic Party of the Memel Territory (SDPM). He did not run for re-election in 1927, and after leaving the Assembly he worked as a driver for the Memel Dampfboot publishing company.

After 1945 Plenning lived in East Germany. He died in Fürstenwalde/Spree on 12 May 1949.
