= Adolf Monien =

German politician

Adolf Monien was a German politician from the Memel Territory. He was born in 1894. He was one of the two co-chairmen of the pro-communist Memel Workers Party. He was elected to the parliament of the Memel Territory in 1927.

In 1935 he was again elected to the Memel Territory parliament, as a candidate of the Memel Unity List. He succeeded Arthur Papendick, who had died March 24, 1936, as the Memel Unity List parliamentary group chair.

Monien became a member of the Directorate (the executive branch of government of the Memel Territory) in 1939, as a workers' representative. He joined the NSDAP around March-April 1939.

Per Balling (1991), Monien might have died around 1945.
