= Hermann Suhrau =

German communist politician (1898–1947)

Hermann Suhrau (1898–1947) was a German politician. Suhrau was born on 25 April 1898 in Memel, East Prussia (present-day Klaipėda, Lithuania). He was a wood- and construction worker. He was a workers' leader in inter-war Memel.

Suhrau joined the communist Memel Workers Party (MAP) when it was founded in 1925. He stood as a candidate in the 1925 Memel Territory Landtag election, occupying the sixth place on the MAP list. He became the leader of MAP in 1927. He was elected to the Landtag in the 1927, 1930 and 1932 elections, heading the MAP lists. Although he was a known communist, he maintained links with the German Labour Front in Königsberg in Prussia. Ahead of the 1935 Landtag election, MAP had joined the Memel Unity List (MEL). Suhrau stood as a MEL candidate, and was elected as the second alternate member of the chamber. On 26 April 1936 he again became a Landtag deputy following the death of the deputy Bernhard Mielke (who had died five days earlier).

Following the re-integration of the Memel Territory into Germany, Suhrau became a member of the local National Socialist German Workers Party (NSDAP) organization. He fought in the campaign in Poland, but was released from military service after undergoing surgery in 1940. During the period of 1940 and 1944, he worked in the city administration and served as the caretaker of the Youth Music School of Memel. In October 1944 Suhrau and his family fled towards western Germany. In March 1945, they settled in Gefrees. Suhrau died at a Bayreuth hospital on 13 February 1947.
