= Memel People's Party =

The Memel People's Party or MVP (German: Memelländische Volkspartei, Lithuanian: Klaipėdos krašto tautos partija) was a pro-German political party in the Klaipėda Region (Memel Territory), autonomous region of Lithuania, from 1925 to 1938.

Together with the Memel Agricultural Party, the party was established on June 13, 1925, by the Memel Cultural Union (Memelländischer Kultubund) in preparation for the first elections to the local county councils and the Parliament of the Klaipėda Region. The party leaders were Joseph Kraus, Richard Meyer, Robert Grabow. MVP represented mainly industrialists, merchants, craftsmen, clerks, city dwellers. The party received funding from Germany and was able to provide no-interest loans to its members, gaining significant influence in the region. MVP published newspaper Memeler Dampfboot.

In May 1926, the party won two seats (out of 85) in the Third Seimas of Lithuania (representatives Robert Grabow and Max Jackstaidt). After the Nazi seizure of power in Germany in 1933, MVP lost its funding from Germany and began losing its members to the pro-Nazi Socialist National Community (Sozialistische Volksgemeinschaft or SOVOG) and Christian-Socialist Workers Community (Christlich-Sozialistische Arbeitsgemeinschaft or CSA). Some of the MVP activists retreated to Germany, others were arrested and tried for their anti-Lithuanian activities in the Neumann–Sass case. The weakened party ran in later elections under the unified German list (Memelländische Einheitsliste in 1935 and Memeldeutsche Einheitsliste in 1938). Its activities largely ceased of the 1938 elections.

== Election results ==
Summary of the Memel People's Party election results
To the Parliament of the Klaipėda Region				To the local county councils of...				To the city council of...	
Date	Votes	%	Seats (Total: 29)	Date	...Klaipėda (Total seats: 20)	...Šilutė (Total seats: 21)	...Pagėgiai (Total seats: 21)	Date	...Klaipėda (Total seats: 40)
1925-10-19	23,082	36.9	11	1925-07-10	1	5	1	1924-06-28	19
1927-08-30	17,636	32.2	10	1928-06-11	1	4	1	1927-06-28	19
1930-10-10	13,709	27.6	8	1931-06-22	2	2	1	1930-05-19	18
1932-05-04	17,930	27.3	8	1932-07-22; 1933-03-14	2	–	–	1933-05-19	8
