= Memeler Volksstimme =

Memeler Volksstimme ('People's Voice of Memel') was a socialist newspaper published from Memel (present-day Klaipėda, Lithuania). It was a mouthpiece of the Social Democratic Party of Germany (SPD). The newspaper was launched in December 1919 as the organ of the Workers and Soldiers Council of Memel and the Free Trade Unions. Erich Bührig was the editor of Memeler Volksstimme.

In 1924 Memeler Volksstimme was replaced by Memelländische Volkszeitung.
