= Memel Agricultural Party =

Pro-German political party in the Memel Territory

Memel Agricultural Party or MLP (German: Memelländische Landwirtschaftspartei) was the largest and most influential pro-German political party in the Klaipėda Region (Memel Territory) from 1925 to 1934. Leaders of the party were Heinrich Conrad, Konrad von Dressler and James Gubba.

== History ==
Together with the Memel People's Party, the party was established on June 13, 1925, by the Memel Cultural Union (Memelländischer Kulturbund) in preparation for the first elections to the local county councils and the Parliament of the Klaipėda Region. The party represented farmers, war veterans, fishermen, and some clerks. It published Memel Rundschau, Lietuviška ceitunga, Memeler Dampfboot and controlled several agricultural and credit institutions, including Agraria, Landschaftsbank, Vereinsbank, and Raiffeisenbank. MLP was able to offer discounts to its members and thus gained significant influence in the region. In May 1926, the party won three seats (out of 85) in the Third Seimas of Lithuania (August Mielbrecht, Johann Schuischel and Georg Waschkies).

After the Nazi seizure of power in Germany in 1933, MLP became increasingly right-wing and encouraged its members to join the pro-Nazi Socialist National Community (Sozialistische Volksgemeinschaft or SOVOG). For their anti-Lithuanian activities SOVOG and MLP were outlawed in 1934. Some of MLP members were arrested and tried in the Neumann–Sass case. The party ceased its activities; its former members ran in later elections under the unified German list (Memelländische Einheitsliste in 1935 and Memeldeutsche Einheitsliste in 1938).

== Election results ==
Summary of the Memel Agricultural Party election results
To the Parliament of the Klaipėda Region				To local county councils of...			
Date	Votes	%	Seats (Total: 29)	Date	...Klaipėda (Total seats: 20)	...Šilutė (Total seats: 21)	...Pagėgiai (Total seats: 21)
1925-10-19	23,824	38.0	11	1925-07-10	10	8	12
1927-08-30	18,776	34.3	10	1928-06-11	8	10	10
1930-10-10	15,810	31.8	10	1931-06-22	12	11	11
1932-05-04	24,468	37.2	11	1932-07-22; 1933-03-14	11	–	–
