= Anti-Lithuanian sentiment =

Dislike of Lithuania, its people and culture

Anti-Lithuanian sentiment (sometimes known as Lithuanophobia) is the hostility, prejudice, discrimination, distrust, racism or xenophobia directed against the Lithuanian people, Lithuania or Lithuanian culture. It may also include persecution, oppression or expulsion of Lithuanians as an ethnic group.

== By country ==
=== Belarus ===
Some Belarusian academics are known for engaging in historical negationism and trying to culturally appropriate Lithuanian culture, national identity and history of statehood by arguing that the Belarusian word litoutsy (літоўцы), meaning ‘Lithuanian’, historically refers to modern Belarusians instead whereas present-day Lithuanians are pretenders who should actually be identified as letuvisy (летувicы) and are accused of stealing their ethnonym as well as the historic name of their homeland. Some Belarusian scholars consider the statehood of the Grand Duchy of Lithuania to be primordially Slavic, rejecting the notion that its origins come from Baltic Lithuanian tribes. Historian Mikola Yermalovich claimed that King Mindaugas was Belarusian whereas the epicentre of historic Lithuania was actually in central and southern Belarusian lands.

During the Belarusian opposition protests in 2021, a Lithuanian woman was arrested and beaten up by Belarusian OMON forces after they found out she was a Lithuanian citizen.

=== Belgium ===
In 2023, statistics from the previous year alone indicated that a significant number of Lithuanians were exploited or faced discrimination at work in Belgium with Federal Public Service Employment getting around 400 complaints: 168 of cases were from Lithuanians who did not receive their paycheck or it got delayed whereas 234 of them received smaller payments than their coworkers for the same work because of their background. There were also accounts of Lithuanians facing racist or humiliating comments such as being called ‘dirty’, ‘Eastern European’ or noted as coming ‘from the Soviet Union’ in their certificate of employment.

=== Ireland ===
In 2007, a scandal began to surface as it emerged that some Irish schools forbid Lithuanian children from using their native tongue. There was a reported case of Lithuanian girls suffering physical abuse because they were considered to be more attractive than their Irish peers. Inspector for Children’s Rights Rimantė Šalaševičiūtė stated that “Lithuanian children are feeling unsafe and face discrimination” and concluded that Lithuanian and Irish children were not being treated as equals. In 2008, three Lithuanian men were beaten up because of their nationality by bouncers who claimed that people like them are not welcomed.

=== Germany ===
After the creation of the German Empire in 1871, the population of Prussian Lithuanians in East Prussia started to decline even further due to Germanisation. Many Lithuanians who wanted a better life were forced to adopt German culture and eventually abandoned their native tongue. In Prussian governance and within the clergy, German colonists were regarded as the emissaries of "the chosen people" tasked with the mission of Germanizing the Lithuanians as well as other ethnic groups. Prominent officials consistently underscored national disparities in their writings, characterizing the Lithuanian peasantry as belonging to an inferior human race predestined to serve the Germans as their slaves. They also believed their culture being superior to Lithuanian culture whereas the nation itself was considered to be politically inept. In 1916, a German science publication Der Koloss aut fonernen Fusen in Munich wrote:

[T]he Lithuanian himself has a tendency to superior German culture and by taking this path, he can become a loyal citizen of the Reich. [...] those who think that a Lithuanian is already mature enough for even the most primitive form of self-governance are deeply mistaken.

During World War II, in accordance with Generalplan Ost, the Nazis planned to commit a mass-scale genocide of Lithuanians — 85% were to be physically exterminated, which was the second-highest percentage of planned killings of an ethnic group in German-occupied Europe only to be surpassed by Latgalians.

=== Latvia ===
Historically, Lithuanians in Latvia were called leiši, which apart from its primary meaning was also used to refer to someone who is negligent, lazy, uneducated and illiterate. Following Latvia’s declaration of independence, this term was soon replaced by a neologism lietuvieši due to its negative connotations and official complaints from the Lithuanian Government regarding the designation of the nationality of their compatriots in Latvian passports. Philologist Aistė Brusokaitė suggests that Latvians were the first ones to call Lithuanians zirga galva, meaning 'horse head', which was later adopted as an insult by Lithuanians themselves:

Since Latvians were economically more well off than Lithuanians, Latvians that lived by the border used to take young Lithuanian workmen to serve on their farms to do all the dirty work. Latvians were Lutherans and Lutherans always paid more attention to education. Because of this, Latvians were more educated than Lithuanians, which is why less educated, illiterate Lithuanians were sometimes looked down upon and called ‘zirga galva’.

Before World War II, the Government of Latvia closed Lithuanian organisations and schools, which contributed to many Lithuanians fleeing the country as they could no longer ensure proper education for their children. In the 1950s and 60s, however, economically struggling Lithuanians were once again resettling in Latvia where they faced some degree of discrimination from the locals who did not consider them to be equal or trustworthy. There were reported cases of inciting tensions and insults directed at the Lithuanian people as well as children bullied at school for having Lithuanian parents.

=== Poland ===
==== History ====
===== Middle Ages and Early Modern Period =====
The earliest depiction of Lithuanians, found in the few sources dating back to the 13th century, is decidedly negative. They were portrayed as semi-wild, greedy, and cruel pagans. This stereotype emerged as a result of numerous Lithuanian raids on Polish lands, which continued until the end of the 14th century. It was largely repeated by the chronicler Jan Długosz in the 15th century, who was also the first to attribute honorable Roman origins to the Lithuanians. During the Polish–Lithuanian union, interactions primarily took place at the level of the nobility. The Lithuanian nobility gradually adopted the Polish language and cultural elements, yet they were often perceived by the Polish nobility as uncouth and poor. Lithuanians were viewed as stubborn, distrustful, and cunning. Despite this, they were treated as "one of us." The Lithuanian nobility, on the other hand, regarded the Crown nobility as arrogant braggarts prone to megalomania and fond of drunkenness, referring to them as "monkeys." By the 18th century, there was a widespread belief in Lithuania that the Lithuanian nobility spoke Polish better than the Crown nobility. The common Lithuanian people, as well as the lower nobility, often referred to as Samogitians (Polish: Żmudzini), were considered by Poles as barbaric and semi-pagan, speaking an incomprehensible, "bird-like" language.

===== Long 19th century =====
In the 19th century, ethnographers and researchers became increasingly interested in the simple Lithuanian folk, who, unlike the nobility, did not use the Polish language in their daily lives. This interest was connected with the "mythologization of Lithuania" in Polish literary culture, which portrayed Lithuania as a land of peace and tolerance, where robust, simple folk lived in harmony with the Polish manor. In the Polish language, a term analogous to "chłopomania" (lit. 'peasant mania') appeared: "litwomania" (lit. 'Lithuania mania') referring to obsessive fascination with peasant Lithuanian identity.

The term took on a pejorative connotation when the Lithuanian national movement emerged, which generally viewed Polish influence in Lithuania negatively. One of its demands was for Polish-speaking Lithuanians to return to the language of their ancestors and embrace an ethnic Lithuanian identity. In response, a historical theory emerged, claiming that a significant portion of Lithuania's inhabitants had Polish origins, being descendants of thousands of captives brought to Lithuania during the Middle Ages. This theory originated in the early 20th century, primarily in the writings of historians Władysław Abraham and Zygmunt Gloger. Although challenged by subsequent generations of historians, it persisted until the second half of the 20th century.

In Polish public opinion, there was often a lack of understanding regarding the emerging Lithuanian movement, which was perceived as a harmful division of the Polish-Lithuanian community. Many saw it as a Russian, and later also as a German, conspiracy. Litwomans were often perceived as renegades, deliberately abandoning Polish culture and language. The possibility of Lithuanian culture functioning independently of Polish culture was frequently questioned. These traits were most evident in the writings of Poles living in Lithuania. Among them, it was common to deny the Lithuanian movement the exclusive right to use names like "Lithuania," "Lithuanians," and "Grand Duchy of Lithuania," as they felt themselves to be, at the very least, equal heirs to this legacy. Particularly in conservative and national circles, there was a dominant belief in the artificiality of Lithuanian national aspirations, which were seen as lacking any solid linguistic or historical foundations. The entire matter was often reduced to temporary social tensions between the peasant class and the nobility. For a long time, Lithuanian activists, and later the Lithuanian nation, were regarded as "younger, misguided brothers" who would eventually realize the obvious mistake of rejecting Polish identity. Despite the growing tension and new areas of conflict, a lasting anti-Lithuanian sentiment did not develop during this period. Lithuanians were still seen as a close and friendly group, with all negative traits attributed to a group of Lithuanian activists detached from reality.

===== After 1918 =====
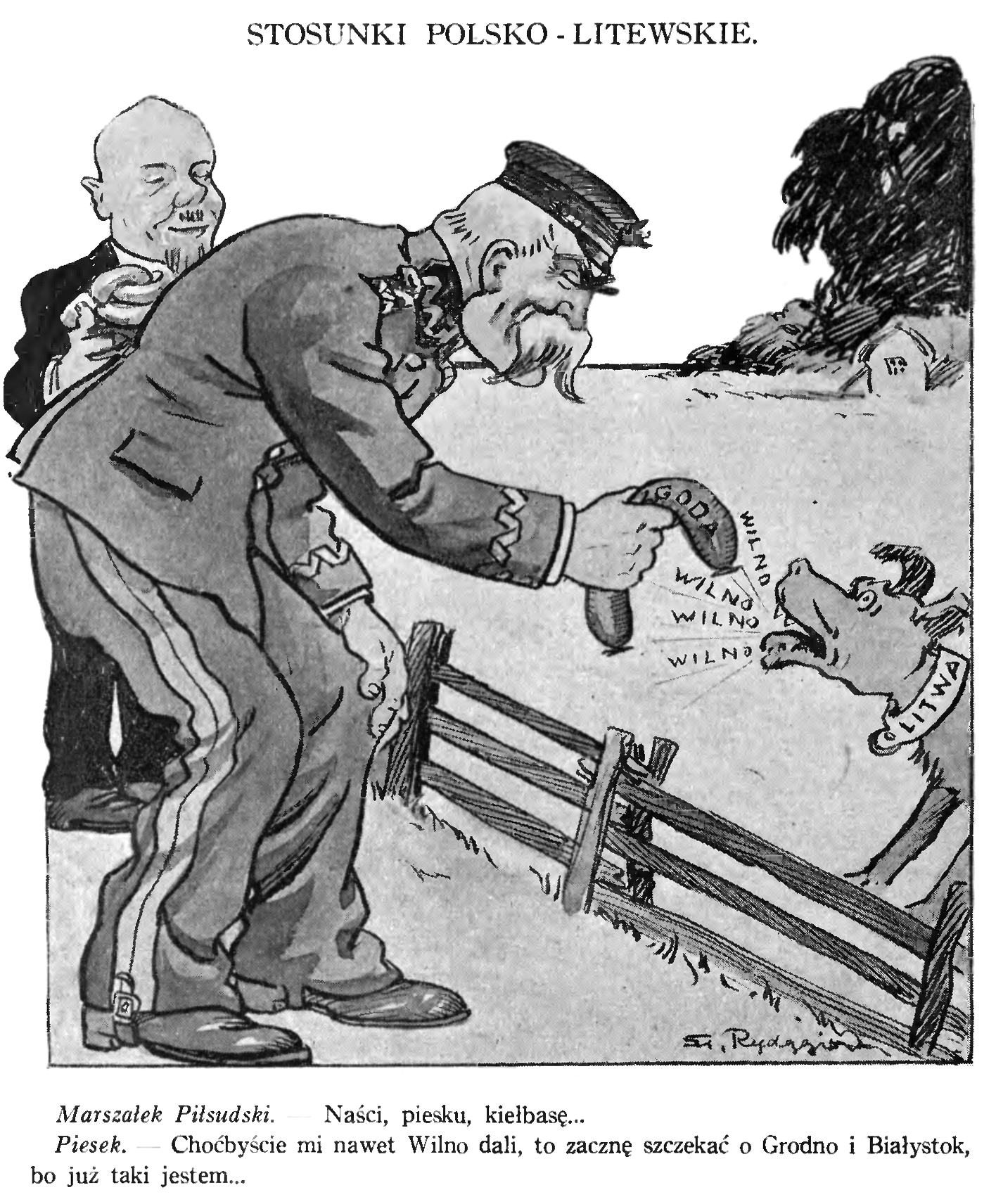
anti-Lithuanian cartoon published in Poland.

The conflict over the auxiliary language (in addition to Latin) in churches within parishes inhabited by both Polish- and Lithuanian-speaking populations, which took place between 1904 and 1914, had a significant impact on the formation of mutual stereotypes. Many nationally-minded Lithuanian priests demanded a greater presence of the Lithuanian language, which often met with resistance from the broader clergy, who were attached to the role of the Polish language in the Catholic Church in Lithuania.

On 23 June 1944, in response to the Glinciszki massacre, which was a Lithuanian revenge campaign for killing their auxiliary policemen, the Polish resistance movement Home Army killed up to 100 Lithuanian civilians in the Dubingiai massacre. The victims included newborns, children, women and the elderly. They also killed 273 Lithuanians in Molėtai from 1943 to 1945.

===== Present =====
In 2013, during a football match between Lech Poznań and Žalgiris clubs in Poznań, Lech fans publicly hanged up a banner, saying “Lithuanian boor, kneel before the Polish master” (Polish: Litewski chamie, klęknij przed polskim panem). Thousands of Poles signed a letter of apology on Gazeta Wyborcza following the incident claiming that “in Poland, there’s no place for such primitive behaviour that insults the Lithuanian nation.”

=== Russia and Soviet Union ===
==== History ====
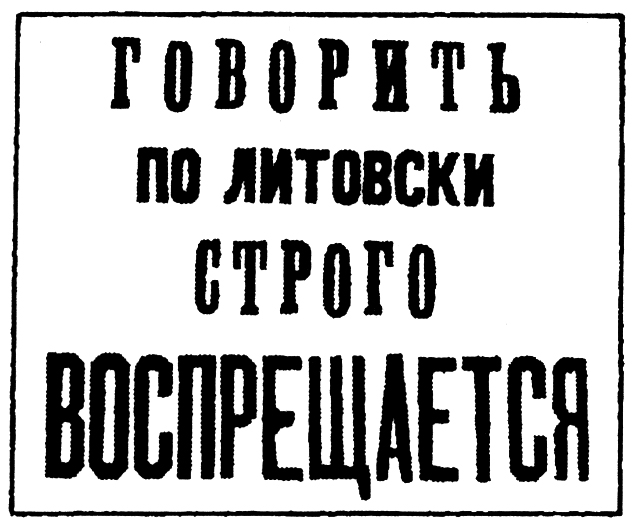
Russian sign: "Speaking Lithuanian is strictly forbidden." (19th century)

After the partitions of the Polish–Lithuanian Commonwealth, most of Lithuania proper fell under Russian rule. From the early 19th century, Russian ethnic policies concerning annexed land were different: unlike in Poland, Latvia, Estonia, or Finland, where Russians imposed more mild integration policies mainly seeking to turn them into loyal subjects of the state, Lithuanians, together with Belarusians and Ukrainians, faced assimilation. The unsuccessful January Uprising (1863–64) resulted in Governor General Mikhail Muravyov initiating the Programme of Restoration of Russian Beginnings that claimed the Lithuanian land had been Russian since ancient times. In 1863, Lithuanian publications in the Latin script were banned. From 1872, only the Cyrillic script was allowed and Lithuanian was banned in schools.

Following the occupation of East Prussia, around 130,000 Prussian Lithuanians suffered from ethnic cleansing as they were slaughtered by the Red Army. Eventually, thousands of local orphans, also known as wolf children (In Lithuanian: vilko vaikai), were left behind to fend for themselves, with many Prussian Lithuanian children escaping to Lithuania proper by crossing the Neman. According to the Research Centre of Lithuania, “In Lithuania Minor and all of East Prussia, there were almost no settlements where the Soviets wouldn’t have killed and tortured the civilian population, destroyed or pillaged their property. Men were killed and women were raped.” NKGB officer Kuzmyn in Klaipėda writes:

In Klaipėda and Šilutė, there are all-around rapes of women happening, regardless of their nationality, physical stance, or age. The beautiful city of Šilutė that was left by the Germans without a battle now looks repulsive.

In 1947, the Council of Lithuania Minor in Fulda, Germany, protested against the ethnic crimes and Russian colonisation of their homeland. Some historians deny accusations of genocide against Prussian Lithuanians, claiming it to be the result of soldier brutality. In 2006, this massacre was officially recognised by Lithuania as genocide against the Prussian Lithuanian people perpetrated by the Soviet regime.

During the Soviet times, the famous slogan “Lithuania shall remain but without Lithuanians” by statesman Mikhail Suslov was coined. Once Lithuania was occupied by the Soviet Union in 1940, immediate Russification followed: the Communist Party of the Soviet Union would give administration positions in the Lithuanian SSR to Russian representatives who often could not speak Lithuanian, while ethnic Russians were encouraged to resettle in Lithuania. In some governmental institutions of Soviet Lithuania, the Lithuanian language was banned. In 1948, 80% of all communists in Lithuania were Russians, whereas only 18.5% of them were Lithuanians, with the situation slightly improving after Stalin's death. In 1953, the leadership of the Lithuanian SSR indirectly admitted that there were attempts to Russify Lithuania and plans to eliminate the politics of national character. In the 1980s, Russification intensified in public life as well: it was mandatory for the Lithuanian Communist Party to report on its progress regarding Russification. From 1972, Lithuanian names were started to be written in accordance with Eastern Slavic naming customs as patronyms were introduced.

==== Present ====
Similarly to the Soviet Union, modern Russia has also been accused of historical negationism, claiming Kaliningrad to be “primordially Russian land” despite the region sharing much closer cultural ties with its neighbouring countries and being a historic Baltic land of Prussian Lithuanians and Old Prussians for centuries. Historical book The Western Part of the Lithuanian Ethnographic Territory, written by Professor Pavel Kushner (Knyshev), exploring Baltic people’s ties to the region, has been removed from all Kaliningrad libraries and mainland Russia, with possibly only a few copies in archives remaining.

Lithuanian authorities have received several reports about the unfounded removal of Lithuanian monuments. In 2003, a bust of Kristijonas Donelaitis in Gusev was desecrated with oil paint before its unveiling ceremony — the periodical Kaliningradskaya Pravda did not investigate the incident. In 2022, a memorial plaque in Sovetsk dedicated to philosopher Wilhelm Storost-Vydūnas was removed. Kaliningrad authorities have also removed a stone sculpture commemorating the famous Prussian resistance leader Herkus Monte.

In the present-day political context, Lithuanians themselves have been regularly insulted by being labeled as "nazis" or "fascists" by the Russian state media and press due to the Lithuanian killing squad Ypatingasis būrys carrying out atrocities against the Jewish population during the Holocaust, and Lithuanian leadership defending partisans of questionable reputation. Russian programmes have also come under scrutiny for using deceitful language when spreading false historical narratives about Lithuania: most notable examples include insinuating that Lithuanians served in a national Waffen-SS legion (Note: Lithuanian Legion of the Waffen-SS was a military formation, which has been approved by Hinrich Lohse on February 19, 1943. However, on March 17, 1943, the unit was officially disbanded as Lithuanian men boycotted conscription.) or labelling Antanas Smetona's regime as "fascist", from which Lithuania was then liberated by the Soviets, even though Moscow originally supported its initiators and even funded press publications owned by Nationalists.

In 2015, Russian politician Vladimir Zhirinovsky threatened the territorial integrity of Lithuania by urging Russia to “take back Klaipėda and Vilnius” on national television. In 2022, the State Duma of Russia registered a bill that proposed repealing Russia's resolution recognising Lithuania's independence. In 2023, as a reaction to the President of Lithuania Gitanas Nausėda's encouragement to send more military aid to Ukraine, Russian television host Vladimir Solovyov made claims suggesting that Lithuania is not worthy of its independence, threatened the future of its sovereignty, and asked: “Why do we put up with their existence?”

In March 2025, the Moscow State Institute of International Relations’ publishing house published a 400-page monograph titled "History of Lithuania", which was a toll of Russian propaganda intended to distort Lithuania's history and statehood by denying or questioning Lithuanian people's history, culture, language, and state symbols, alongside explicitly denying Russia's aggression and occupation of Lithuania throughout history as well as atrocities perpetrated by Russians against Lithuanians. The book was authored by nine individuals, with Maxim Grigoryev, head of the pro-Kremlin Foundation for the Study of Democracy Problems, as its lead author. Additionally, the book's foreword was written by Russian Foreign Minister Sergey Lavrov, and one of its coauthors included Giedrius Grabauskas, a former associate of Lithuanian politician Algirdas Paleckis (former chairman of Lithuanian political party Socialist People's Front), who was convicted in July 2021 of spying for Russia.

There have been instances of Russian ethnically motivated violence directed against the Lithuanians living in Lithuania. In 2020, a 24-year-old Russian man who received political asylum physically assaulted a Lithuanian teacher in Visaginas for teaching Russians Lithuanian in school and called Lithuanians "man-eaters." Lithuanians have also been attacked for addressing Russian speakers in Lithuanian, either as pedestrians or clients.

=== United Kingdom ===
Lithuanians have reported facing double standards when seeking to come to the United Kingdom. There have been reports of Lithuanians having to pay £55 more for obtaining a UK visa than citizens from other EU countries. Despite Britain’s official explanation that the larger price is a result of Lithuania not ratifying the Social Charter of the European Commission of 1961, Embassy of Lithuania claimed this decision to be discriminatory and “not fully convincing” as the country did ratify the Social Charter of 1986, which “[f]rom a legal stance, is not a more inferior document.” Post-Brexit amendments affecting labour migration in Britain have also been considered discriminatory against Lithuanian migrant workers, as these amendments resulted in a significant increase in costs for employers to employ Lithuanian emigrants compared to other nationals. In the words of the representative for IOM Audra Sipavičienė, additional taxes for employers “may contribute to Lithuanians being discriminated against in the labour market. This means there will be no interest in taking a more expensive Lithuanian instead of a cheaper Latvian.” Additionally, several instances of hostility towards Lithuanian migrants, accompanied by property damage, have been recorded, although motives for such attacks may vary. In 2016, a twelve-year-old Lithuanian boy was beaten up in Manchester because of his nationality by his British peer, who was ordered to do so by his mother waiting for him in the car. Many Lithuanian families have claimed their children suffered abuse in public schools because of their nationality.

== Bibliography ==
- Buchowski, Krzysztof (2006). Litwomani i polonizatorzy. Mity, wzajemne postrzeganie i stereotypy w stosunkach polsko-litewskich w pierwszej połowie XX wieku [Litwomans and Polonizers: Myths, Mutual Perceptions, and Stereotypes in Polish-Lithuanian Relations in the First Half of the 20th Century] (in Polish). Białystok.
