= Culture of Lithuania =

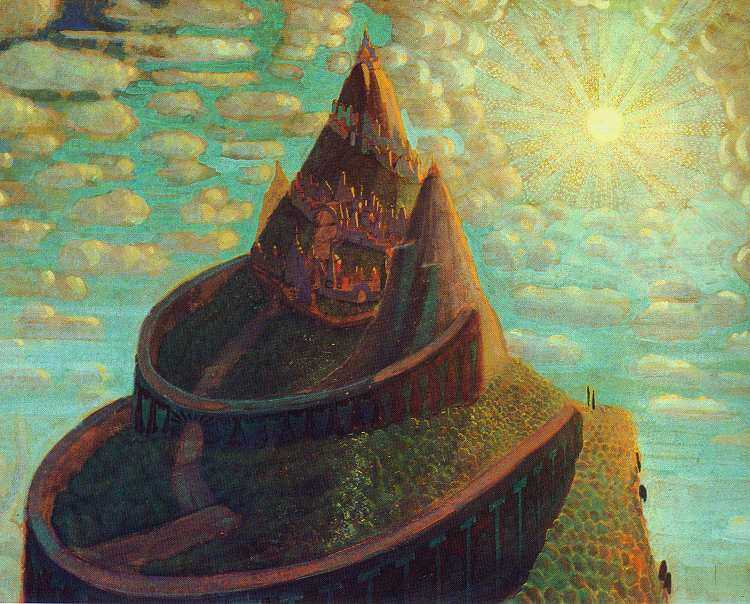
Le Château — Conte de fées (Lithuanian: Pilis — Pasaka) by Mikalojus Konstantinas Čiurlionis (1909)

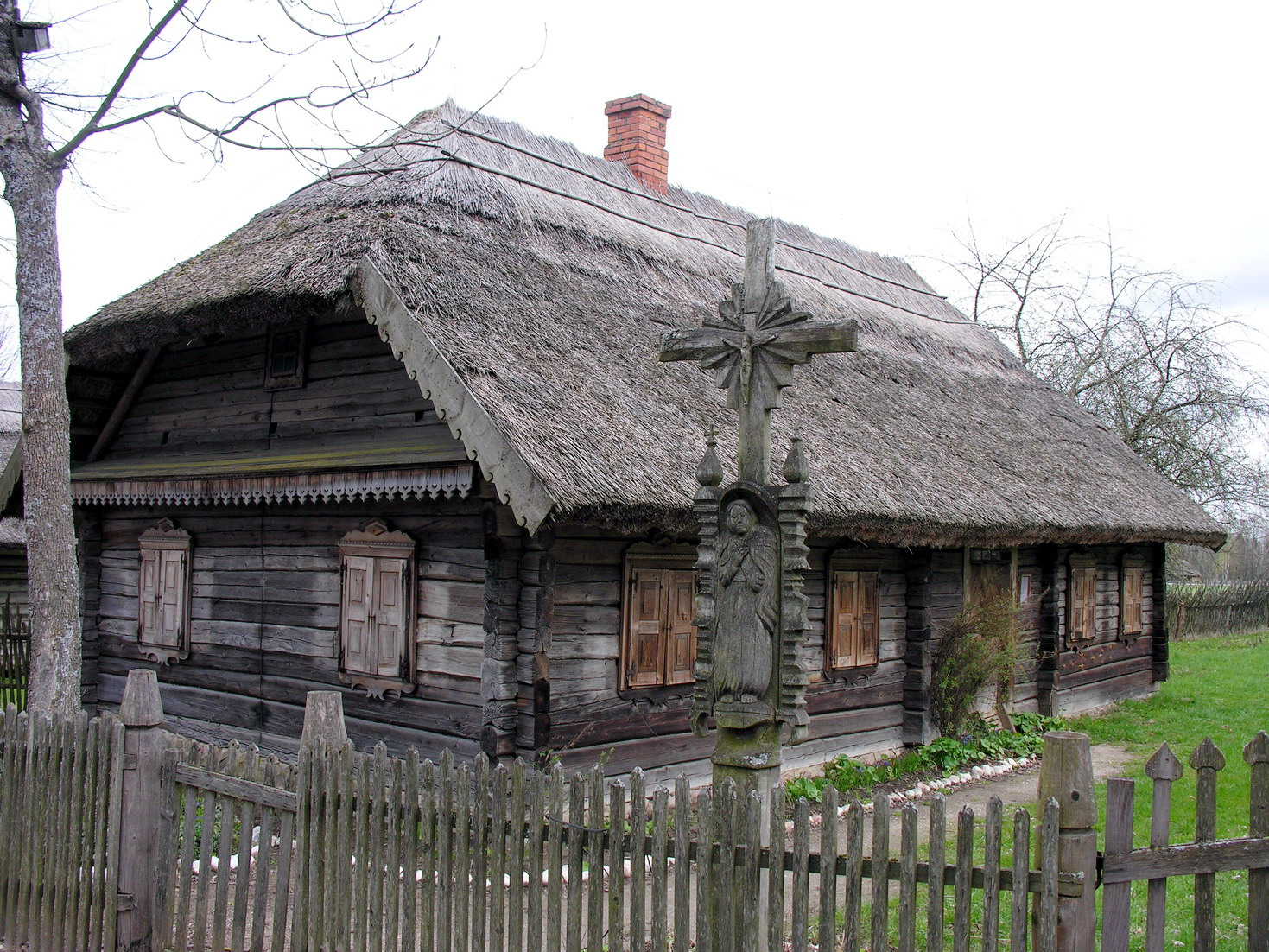
Traditional Lithuanian house from late 19th century

Culture of Lithuania combines an indigenous heritage, represented by the unique Lithuanian language, with Nordic cultural aspects and Catholic traditions resulting from historical ties with Poland. Although linguistic resemblances represent strong cultural ties with Latvia in various historical moments Lithuania was influenced by Nordic, Germanic and Slavic cultures. Various cultural changes occurred throughout Lithuania's transformation from a country occupied by the Soviet Union to an independent Baltic state. The culture of Lithuania can be divided into five ethnographic regions: Dzūkija, Žemaitija, Aukštaitija, Suvalkija and Mažoji Lietuva.

== Ethnicity and nationality ==
Lithuania has the most homogeneous population in the Baltic states. In the 2001 census, 83.45% of the population identified themselves as ethnic Lithuanians, 6.74% as Poles, 6.31% as Russians, 1.23% as Belarusians, and 2.27% as members of other ethnic groups. Poles in Lithuania are concentrated in the Vilnius Region, allowing Electoral Action of Poles in Lithuania, their ethnically based party, to exert some influence. Russians, however, are relatively evenly spread throughout Lithuania. Lithuanians are usually divided into 5 groups: Samogitians, Sudovians, Aukštaitians, Dzūkians and Lietuvininkai, although the Lietuvinikai are nearly extinct. City dwellers, however, are most often simply called Lithuanians.

== Language ==
Lithuanian is the official language of Lithuania. Lithuanian, an Indo-European language, closely resembles ancient Sanskrit, and is written using the Latin alphabet. It is considered by scholars that the Lithuanian language retained, with the fewest changes, most of the elements of Proto-Indo-European language. Various dialects of Lithuanian exist, such as High Lithuanian (Aukštaitian) and Low Lithuanian (Samogitian).

During the Lithuanian press ban (1864–1904), Lithuanian was censored by the Russians, and could only be written with the Cyrillic alphabet. Literature in the Lithuanian alphabet was burned and forbidden from publication. Schools, churches, courts, and newspapers faced heavy penalties if Latin text were to be displayed during these years, with violators even exiled to Siberia.

== Religion ==
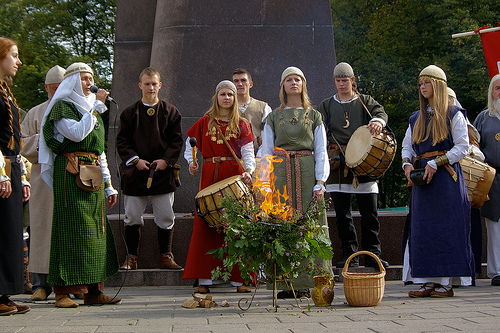
A ceremony of Lithuanian modern pagans.

Since the Christianization of parts of Lithuania proper in 1387 and of Samogitia in 1413, the majority of Lithuanians have been members of the Roman Catholic Church. According to the 2001 census, 79% of Lithuanians are Roman Catholic. Approximately 4.9% of the population are Eastern Orthodox, mainly the Russian minority. Under Article 26 of the Constitution of Lithuania, persons can freely practice a religion of their choosing.

Catholicism played a significant role in Lithuanian anti-communist resistance under the Soviet Union. Several Catholic priests were leaders of the anti-communist movements, and thousands of Latin crosses were placed on the Hill of Crosses near Šiauliai, despite it being bulldozed in 1961.

== Education ==
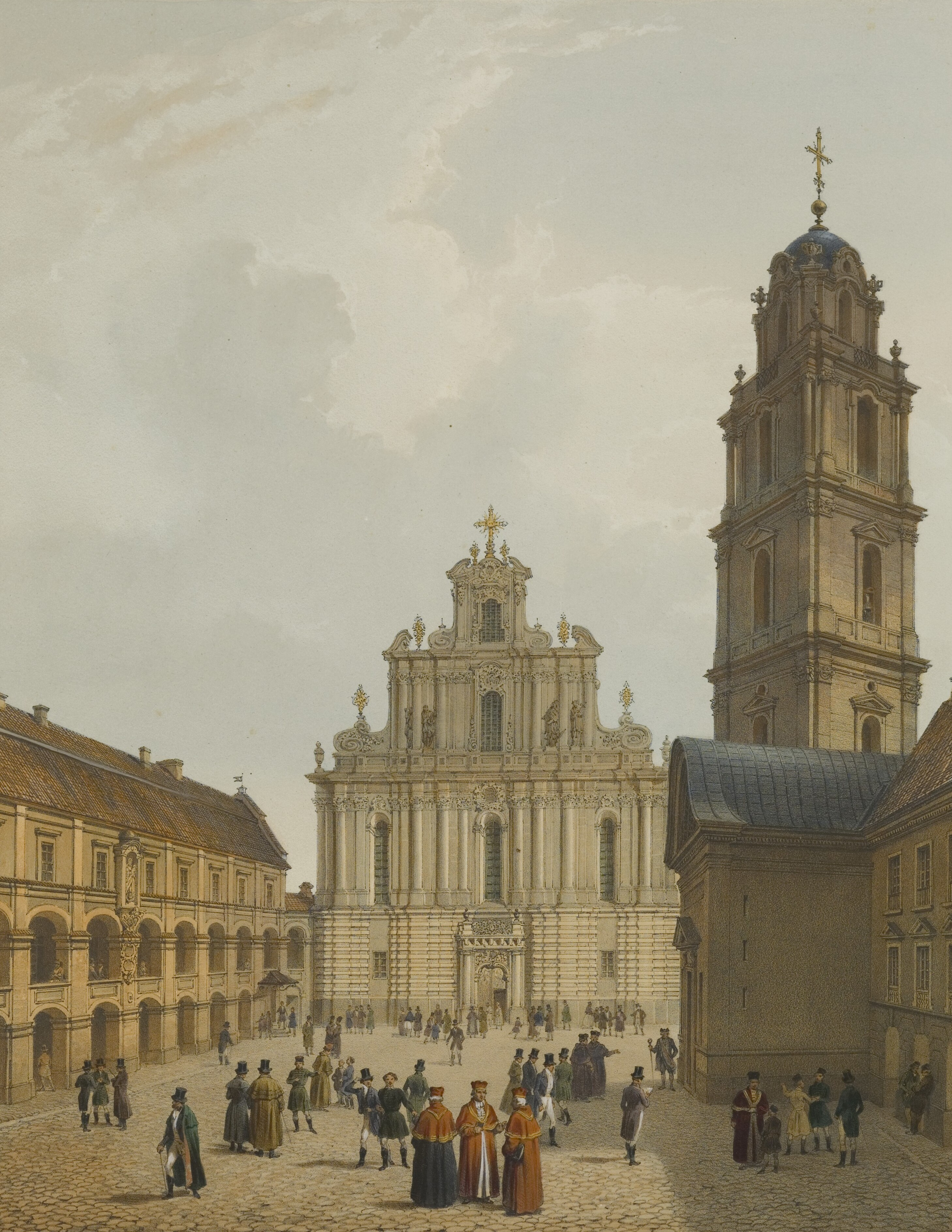
The Great Courtyard of Vilnius University and the Church of St. Johns

Education in Lithuania exists from pre-school to adult education. Colleges and universities in Lithuania have undergraduate and higher education. Pre-school is for children aged three to six years. After pre-school, children enroll in primary school from seven to ten years of age. At eleven, students begin secondary school until the age of 18. Once the general education is completed, students go to college or university. Students can take the UK exam to study overseas. A bachelor's degree takes four years, traditionally, to complete. A master's takes one to two years to complete; and a doctoral degree takes four years. Lithuania's oldest university is Vilnius University, which was founded in 1579.

== Food and lifestyle ==
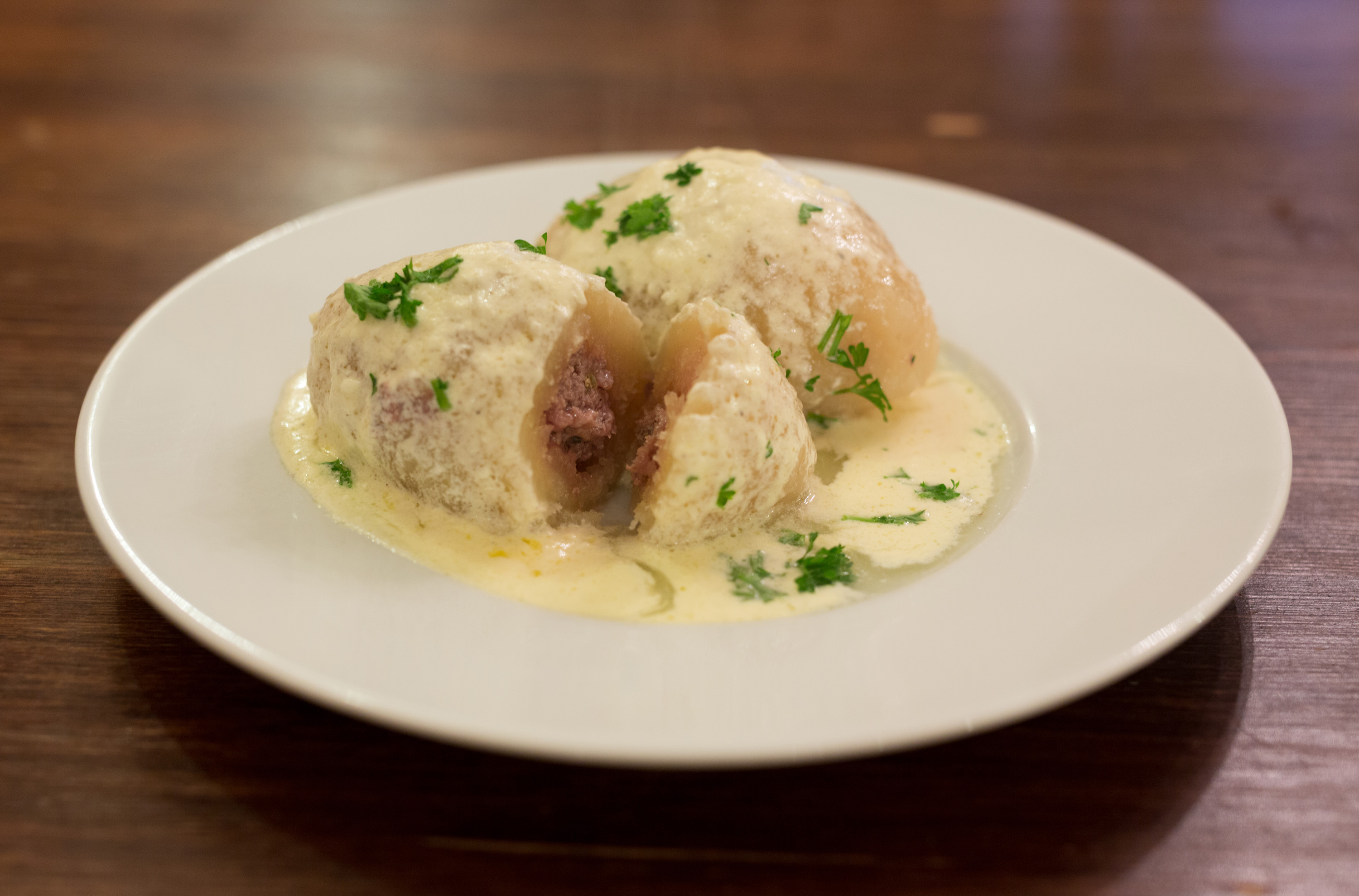
Cepelinai with ground meat cut open

Lithuanian cuisine features the products suited to its cool and moist northern climate: barley, potatoes, rye, beets, greens, berries, and mushrooms are locally grown, and dairy products are one of its specialities. Since it shares its climate and agricultural practices with Eastern Europe, Lithuanian cuisine has much in common with other Eastern European and Ashkenazi cuisines. Nevertheless, it has its own distinguishing features, which were formed by a variety of influences during the country's long and difficult history. German traditions also influenced Lithuanian cuisine, introducing pork and potato dishes, such as potato pudding (kugelis or kugel) and potato sausages (vėdarai), as well as the baroque tree cake known as šakotis. The most exotic of all the influences is Eastern (Crimean Karaites) cuisine, and the dishes kibinai and čeburekai are popular in Lithuania. Torte Napoleon was introduced during Napoleon's passage through Lithuania in the 19th century. Some traditional meals are didžkukuliai (also called cepelinai) – potato dumplings, šaltibarščiai – cold borscht (beetroot soup), juoda duona – dark rye bread, balandėliai – stuffed cabbage rolls, bulviniai blynai – potato pancakes, gira – kvass (fermented rye bread drink), and lašiniai – smoked fatback.

== Media and art ==
=== Art and museums ===
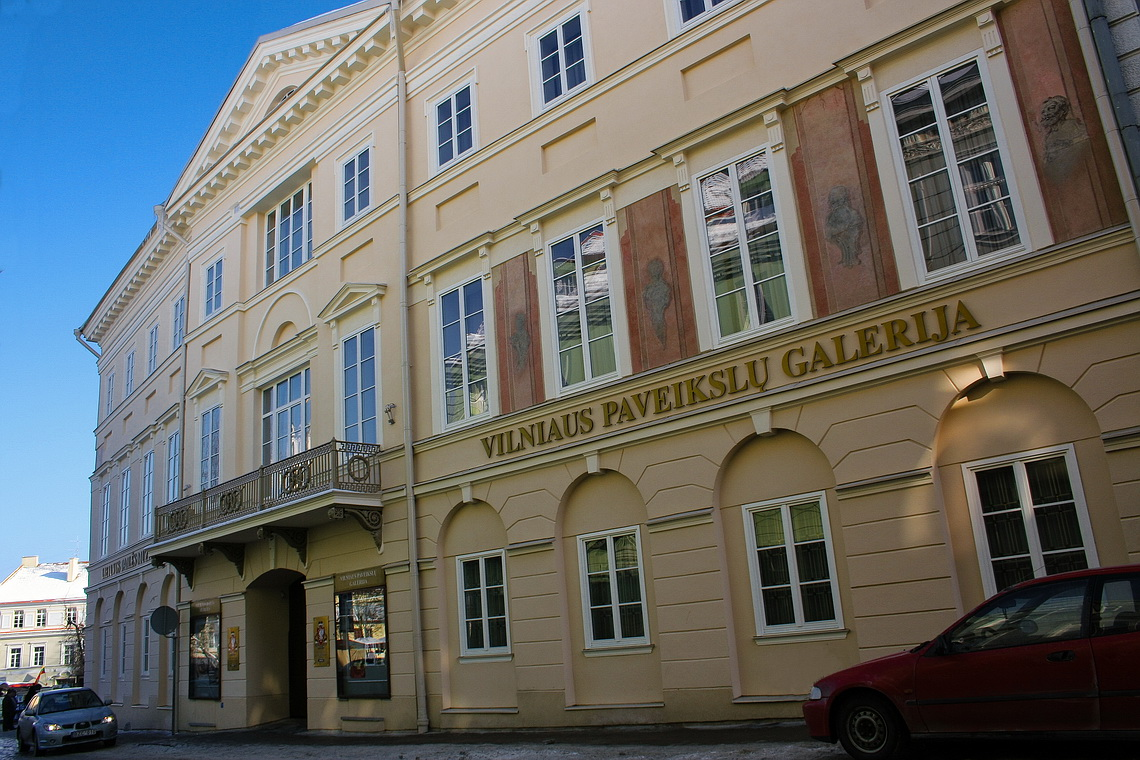
The Picture Gallery in Vilnius' Chodkiewicz Palace

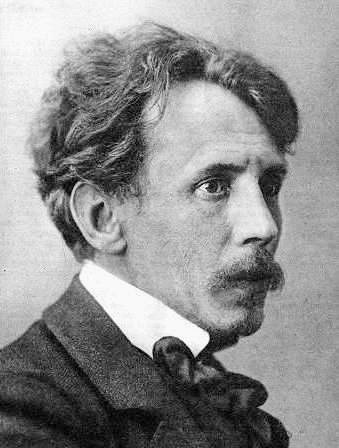
Mikalojus Konstantinas Čiurlionis

Lithuania's art community is famous for Mikalojus Konstantinas Čiurlionis (1875–1911). Čiurlionis was a nationally renowned musician and artist in Lithuania. His symphonic compositions, Jūra ("The sea") and Miške ("In the forest"), were the first full-length pieces from a Lithuanian musician. Jūra ("The sea") and Miške ("In the forest") were composed to represent Lithuania's landscape. After Čiurlionis's death, the 2420 Čiurlionis asteroid honors his achievements after being discovered in 1975.

A large number of museums exist in Lithuania. The Lithuanian Art Museum was founded in 1933 and is the largest museum of art preservation and display in Lithuania. The Palanga Amber Museum is a subsidiary of the Lithuanian Art Museum. Various amber pieces comprise a major part of the museum. In total, 28,000 pieces of amber are displayed, and about 15,000 contain inclusions of insects, spiders, or plants. Some 4,500 amber pieces in the museum are used for artwork and jewelry.

The Lithuanian Museum of Ancient Beekeeping displays various forms of bee hives. The Grūtas Park contains Soviet-era relics and statues including those of Vladimir Lenin and Joseph Stalin.

=== Music ===
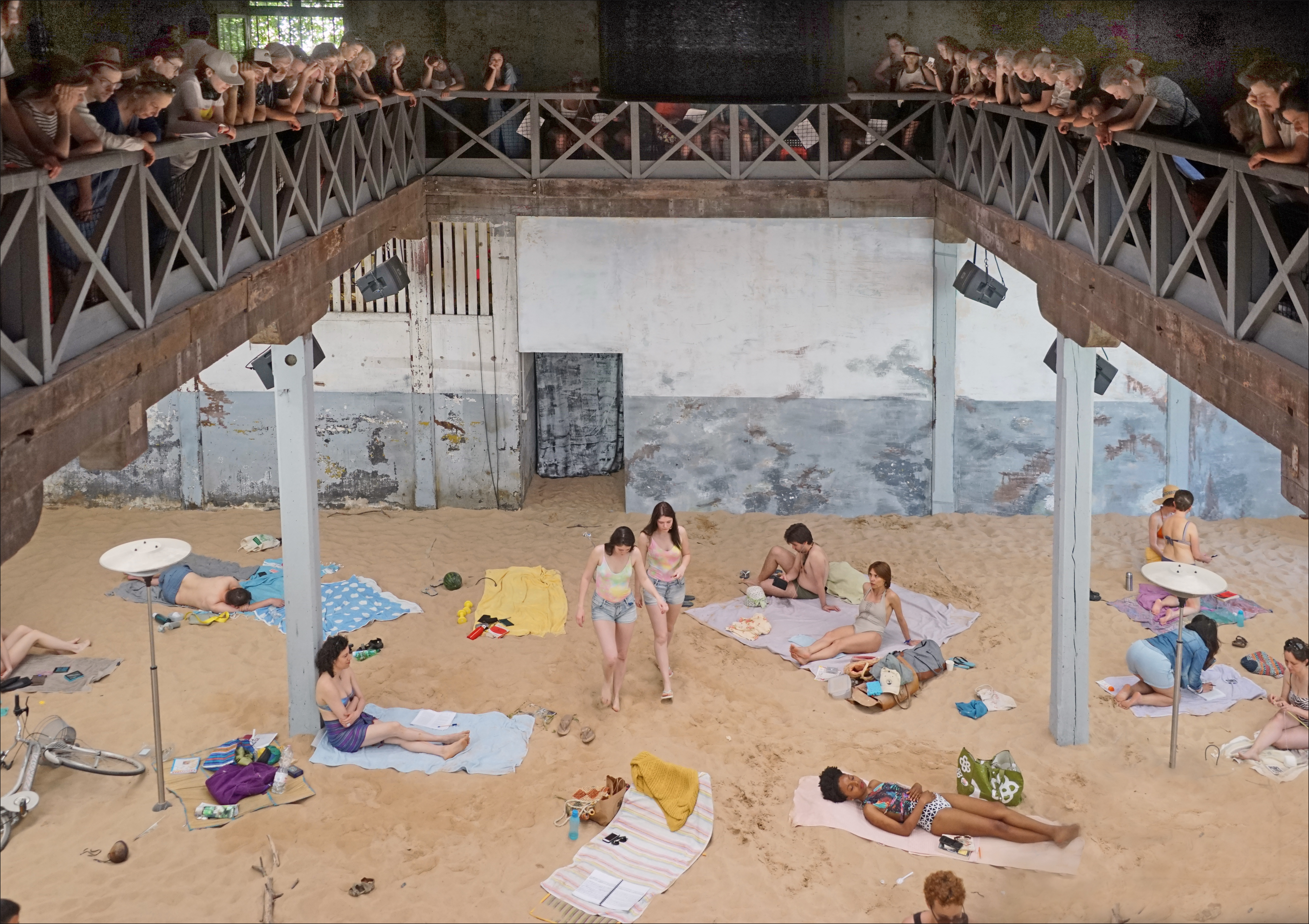
Opera performance Sun & Sea (Marina) at 2019 Venice Biennale

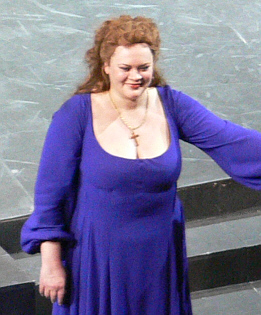
Violeta Urmanavičiūtė, a Lithuanian soprano singer.

Lithuania has a long history of folk, popular and classical musical development. Lithuanian folk music is based primarily around polyphonic music played on flutes, zithers (kanklės) and other instruments.

==== Folk ====
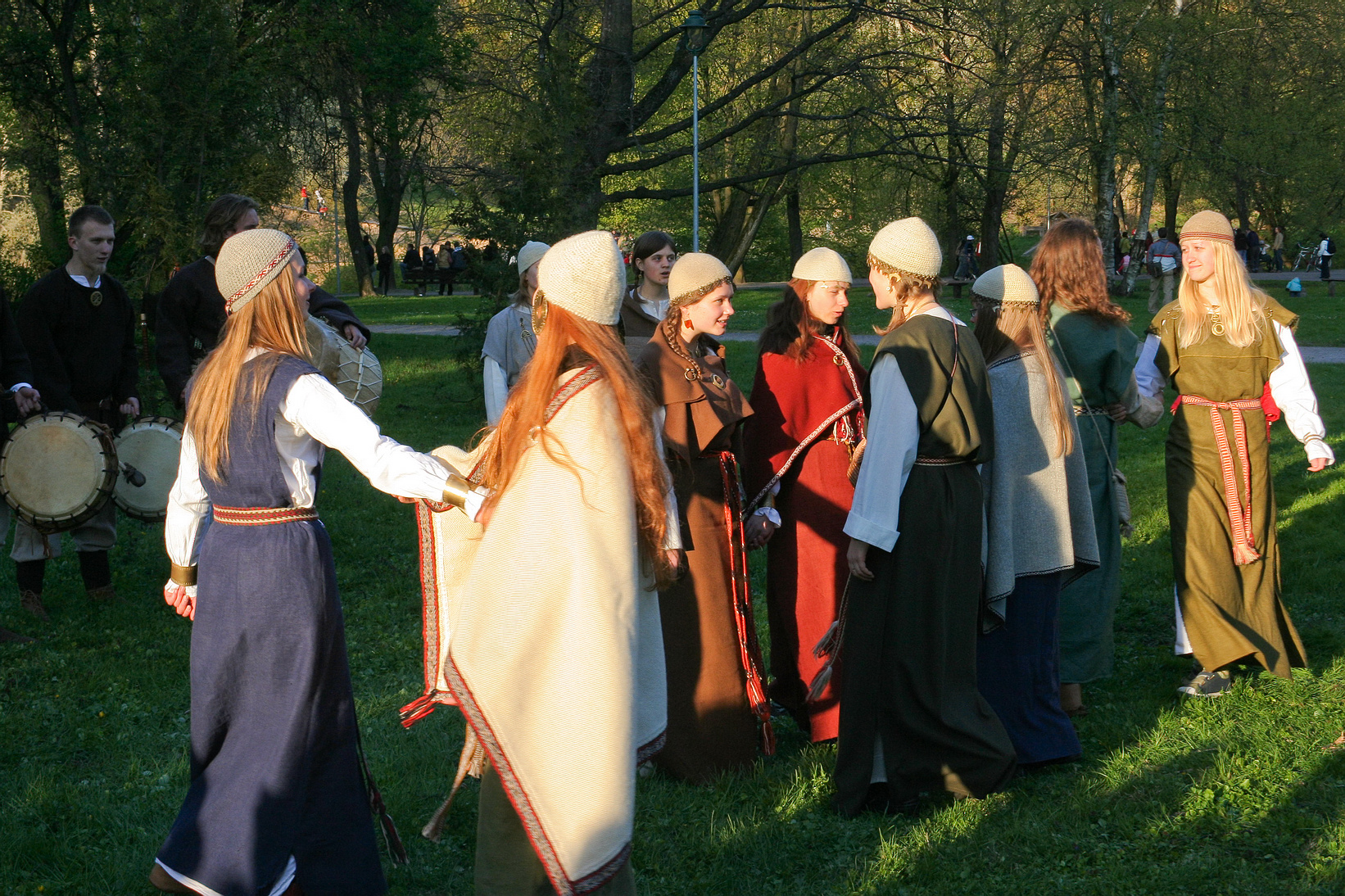
A Lithuanian folklore band Kūlgrinda performing in Vilnius

Lithuanian folk music is based around songs (dainos), which include romantic, wedding songs, as well as work songs and more archaic war songs. Traditional vocal music is held in high esteem on a world scale: Lithuanian song fests and sutartinės multipart songs are on the UNESCO's representative list of the Masterpieces of the Oral and Intangible Heritage of Humanity. Folk songs were performed either in groups or alone, and in parallel chords or unison. Duophonic songs are common in the renowned sutartinės tradition of Aukštaitija. Another style of Lithuanian folk music is called rateliai, a kind of round dance. Instrumentation includes kanklės, a kind of zither that accompanies sutartines, rateliai, waltzes, quadrilles and polkas, and fiddles, (including a bass fiddle called the basetle), a kind of whistle called the lumzdelis and, similar in sound to clarinet, birbyne; recent importations, beginning in the late 19th century, including the concertina, accordion and bandoneon. Sutartinė is accompanied by the skudučiai, a form of panpipes played by a group of people, as well as wooden trumpets (ragai and dandytės). The kanklės is an extremely important folk instrument, which differs in the number of strings and performance techniques across the country. Other traditional instruments include the švilpas (whistle), drums and tabalas (a percussion instrument like a gong), sekminių ragelis (bagpipe) and the pūslinė (a musical bow made from a pig's bladder filled with dried peas).

==== Rock ====
In the 1980s, rock bands Foje, Antis, and Bix made a big impact in Lithuania.

=== Cinema and theatre ===
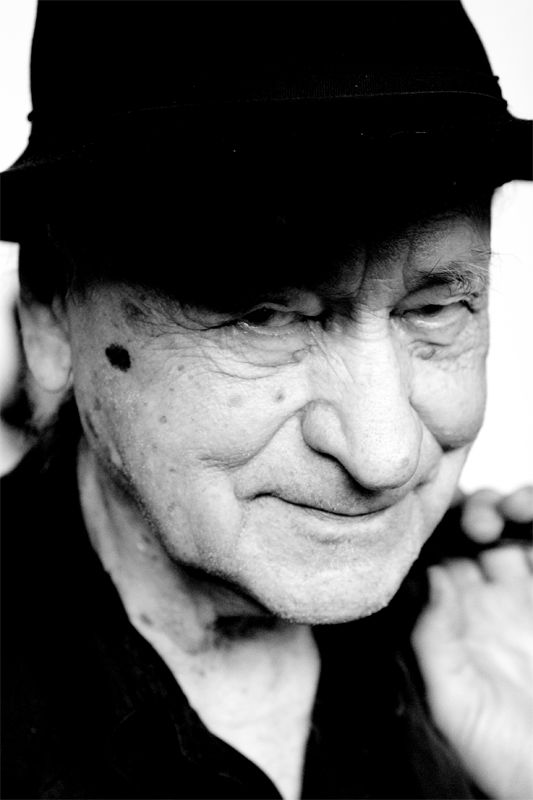
Lithuanian artist Jonas Mekas, regarded as godfather of American avant-garde cinema

Lithuania has a lively drama scene. Many film festivals exist, such as Kino Pavasaris and the AXX Commercial Film Festival Contest. Film tradition has emerged throughout Lithuania's occupation by the Soviet Union. A popular Lithuanian film classic is Velnio Nuotaka, which is based upon folk tales.

A major theater in Lithuania is the Lithuanian National Drama Theater. Another theatre, the Vilnius Little Theatre, was founded by Rimas Tuminas. Vilnius Little Theatre produces Shakespeare plays and other productions. Actors are being taught in the Lithuanian Academy of Music and Theatre, which was founded in 1919 by Juozas Naujalis as the Kaunas Music School. The academy was renamed in 2004.

Several directors are important to Lithuania's theatre scene. Eimuntas Nekrošius is a major part of Lithuania's theatre movement and has a theatre company, Meno Fortas. He has produced Shakesperian plays, such as Macbeth, Othello, and Hamlet. Oskaras Koršunovas is another acclaimed contemporary director, producing musicals, studio performances, and plays, including Hamlet and Midsummer Night's Dream.

=== Television ===
The first channel in the Lithuanian language was introduced in 1957. Lithuania has 8 main channels, 24 regional channels and 2 non-Lithuanian channels, with Lithuanian language translation. The national channel is Lithuanian National Radio and Television (Lietuvos televizija; Television of Lithuania).

=== Sports ===
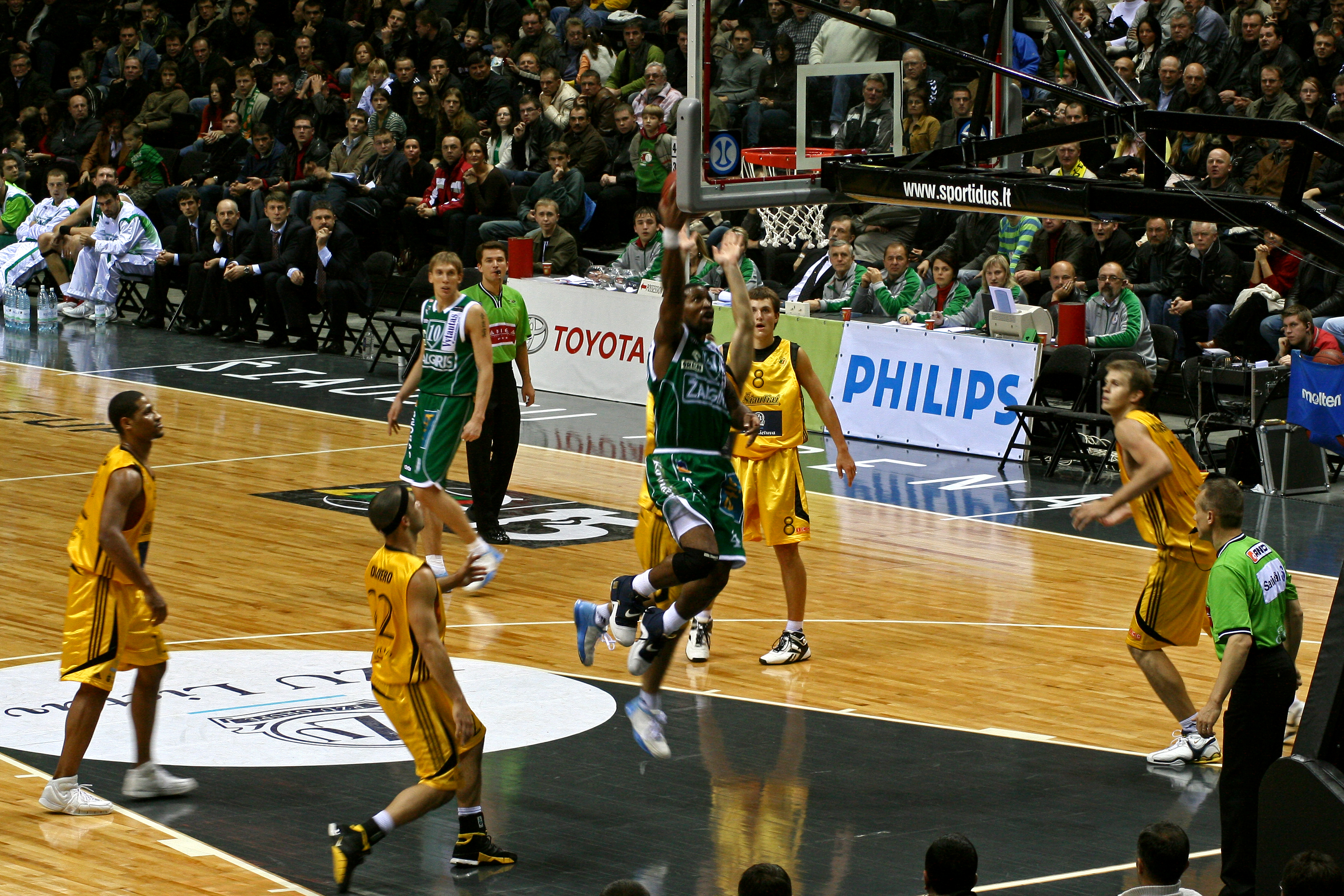
Lithuanian basketball clubs Žalgiris and Šiauliai playing a match

There are eighty Olympic and non-Olympic sports federations in Lithuania. Among the most popular sports in Lithuania are basketball, football, athletics, and cycling. Professional sportsmen and trainers are educated in the Lithuanian Academy of Physical Education.

On October 1, 1932, the Department of Physical Education and Sports was founded. The department supports Lithuanian athletics and promotes physical education. Lithuania's National Olympic Committee supports Lithuania's Olympic athletes and is led by Arturas Poviliunas. Discus throw Olympic athlete Virgilijus Alekna is a two-time gold winner and medalist. Alekna was named UNESCO Champion for Sport in 2007.

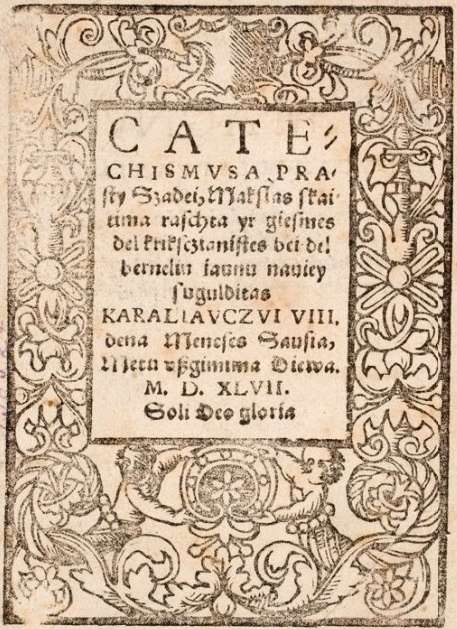
Simple Words of Catechism by Martynas Mažvydas was the first Lithuanian book and was published in 1547.

Lithuania's national basketball team, football team and rugby union team compete internationally. The country has produced several world-class basketball players, such as Arvydas Sabonis, Žydrūnas Ilgauskas and Linas Kleiza.

=== Literature and journalism ===
Lithuania's literature is based upon folklore tradition. Song books began publishing in the sixteenth century. The first Lithuanian book was Katekizmas (Simple Words of Catechism) by Martynas Mažvydas in 1547. An archival site of Lithuanian literature and folklore is the Institute of Lithuanian Literature and Folklore in Vilnius.

Newspapers and magazines are popular in Lithuania. Lithuania's biggest selling newspaper is Lietuvos Rytas. Whereas, Respublika and Vakaro Zinios are tabloid magazines. English language magazine publications are translated into Lithuanian for local consumers.

== Architecture and housing ==
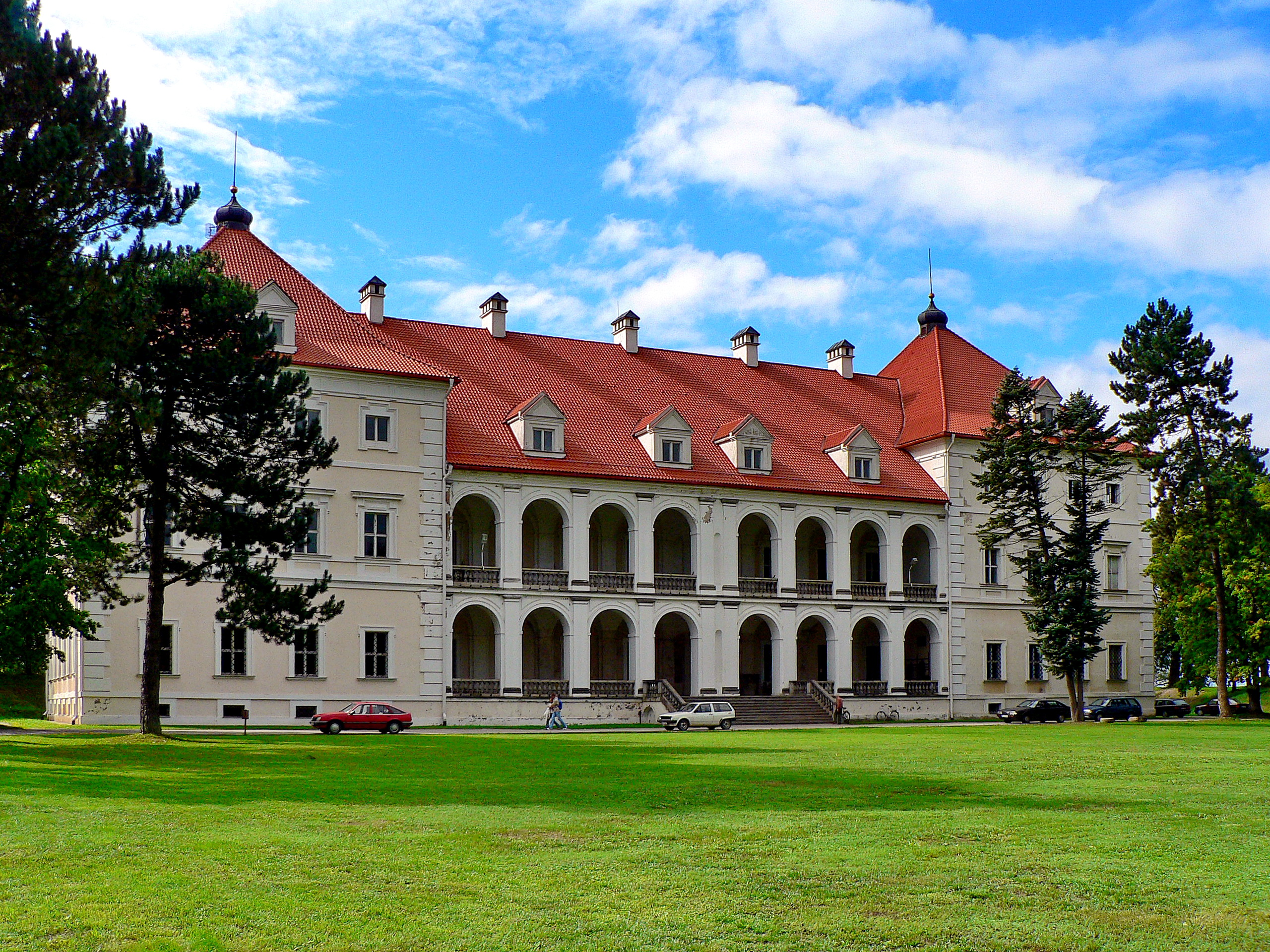
Biržai Castle

Several famous Lithuania-related architects are notable for their achievements in the field of architecture. Johann Christoph Glaubitz, Marcin Knackfus, Laurynas Gucevičius and Karol Podczaszyński were instrumental in introducing Baroque and neoclassical architectural movements to the Lithuanian architecture during the seventeenth to nineteenth centuries.

Lithuania is also known for numerous castles. About twenty castles exist in Lithuania. Some castles had to be rebuilt or survive partially. Lithuanian village life has existed since the days of Vytautas the Great. Zervynos and Kapiniškės are two of many ethnographic villages in Lithuania.

Forty percent of Lithuania's population live in Vilnius, Kaunas, Klaipėda, Alytus, Panevėžys, and Šiauliai. Even though population density has grown within Lithuania, overall, population has declined due to low birth rates and higher death rates. Between 1996 and 2001, the World Bank financed the Lithuania Energy Efficiency Housing Project to renovate thermal temperatures in some of Lithuania's houses, due to Lithuania's cold climate.

== Holidays ==
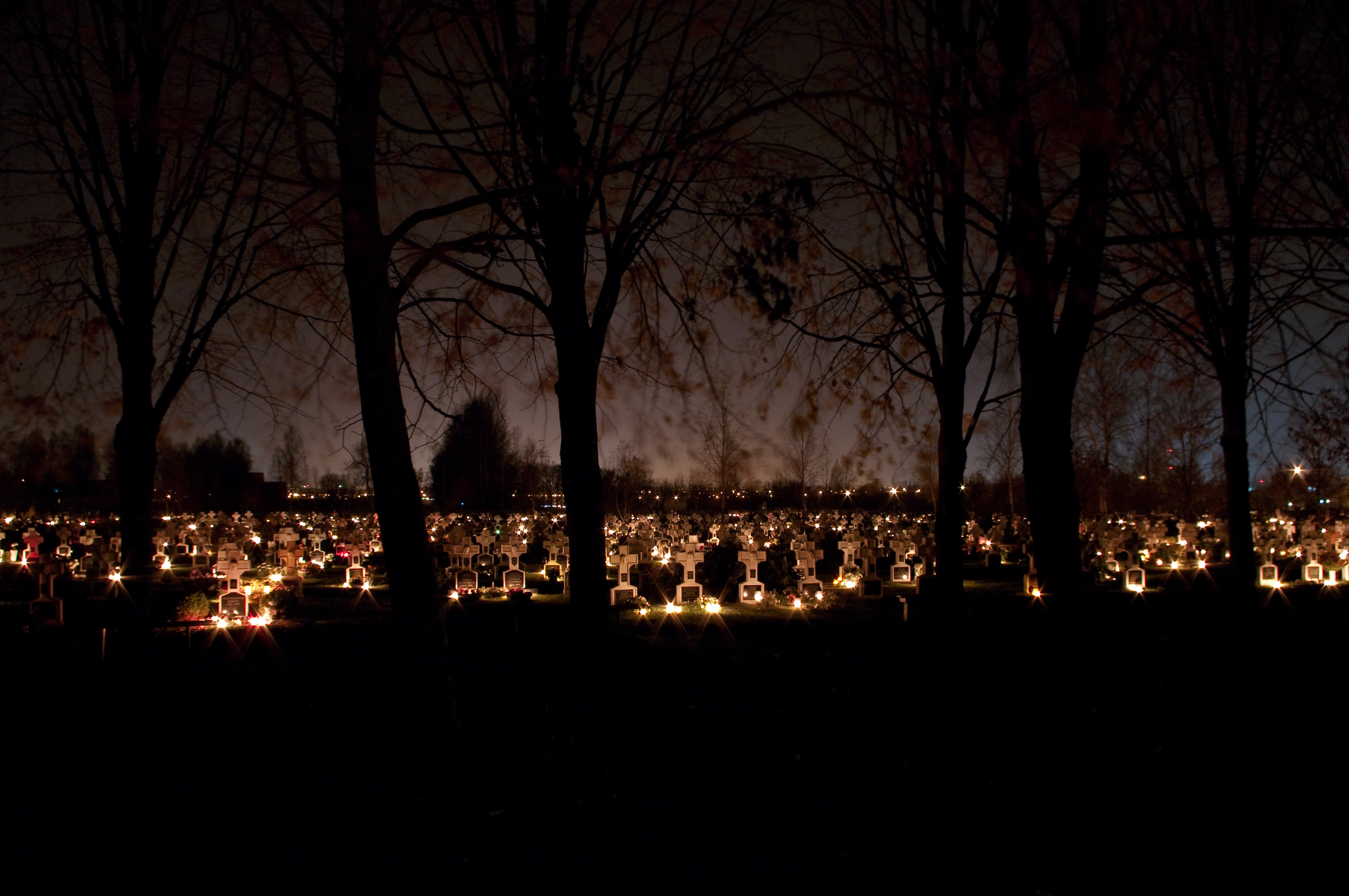
Lithuanian cemetery at All Souls night

The official holidays are found in Article 162 of the Labour Code of the Republic of Lithuania. The holidays are as follows:

- January 1: New Year's Day
- February 16: Day of Re-establishment of the State of Lithuania (1918)
- March 11: Day of Restitution of Independence of Lithuania (from the Soviet Union, 1990)
- First Sunday and Monday of spring with full moon Easter
- May 1: International Labor Day
- First Sunday in May: Mother's Day
- First Sunday in June: Father's Day
- June 24: St. John's Day [Christian name], Day of Dew [original pagan name] traditions. (aka: Midsummer Day, Saint Jonas Day)
- July 6: Statehood Day
- August 15: Assumption Day
- November 1: All Saints' Day
- November 2: All Souls' Day
- December 25 and December 26: Christmas

== See also ==
- History of Lithuanian culture
- Lithuanian mythology
- List of libraries in Lithuania
- List of museums in Lithuania

== Sources ==
- Bousfield, Jonathan (2004). Baltic States: Estonia, Latvia & Lithuania. London, England: Rough Guides. ISBN 1-85828-840-1.
