= Memel Workers' Party =

Communist party in Memel Territory (1925–35)

Memel Workers Party (German: Memelländische Arbeiterpartei, abbreviated MAP; Lithuanian: Klaipėdos krašto darbininkų partija) was a communist organisation in the Memel Territory in 1925–1935. The party was founded in 1925 as a legal organization of the Communist Party of Lithuania. Hermann Suhrau and Adolf Monien served as chairmen of the party. The party was primarily supported by agricultural workers.

== Elections ==
MAP contested the 1925, 1927, 1930 and 1932 elections to the Memel Territory Assembly (Landtag). In the first election held in 1925, the party got 1,564 votes (2.5% of the vote) but no seat in the Assembly. In the 1927 election, the party got 3,844 votes (7.0% of the vote) and won two seats in the Assembly (Hermann Suhrau and Adolf Monien). MAP formed a separate fraction in the Assembly.

In the 1930 election the party got 2,062 votes (4.2% of the vote) and retained its two seats. The elected members were Hermann Suhrau and Hans Szardenings. In the 1932 election MAP got 5,401 votes (8.2% of the vote) and three seats (Suhrau, Szardenings and Gustav Hess). On 4 June 1932 Szardenings resigned from the Assembly and was replaced by Friedrich Galeiwa.

Ahead of the 1935 election MAP joined the Memel Unity List, a broader German movement that developed in a National Socialist direction.

== Histiography ==
Little is known about the group, and its relations with the German and Lithuanian communist parties. Soviet historical research says very little about the group, and on the rare occasions that communist activities in the Memel Territories were mentioned it claimed that the activities had been under influence of the Communist Party of Lithuania.
