= Parliament of the Klaipėda Region =

Legislature of the Memel Territory (1924–39)

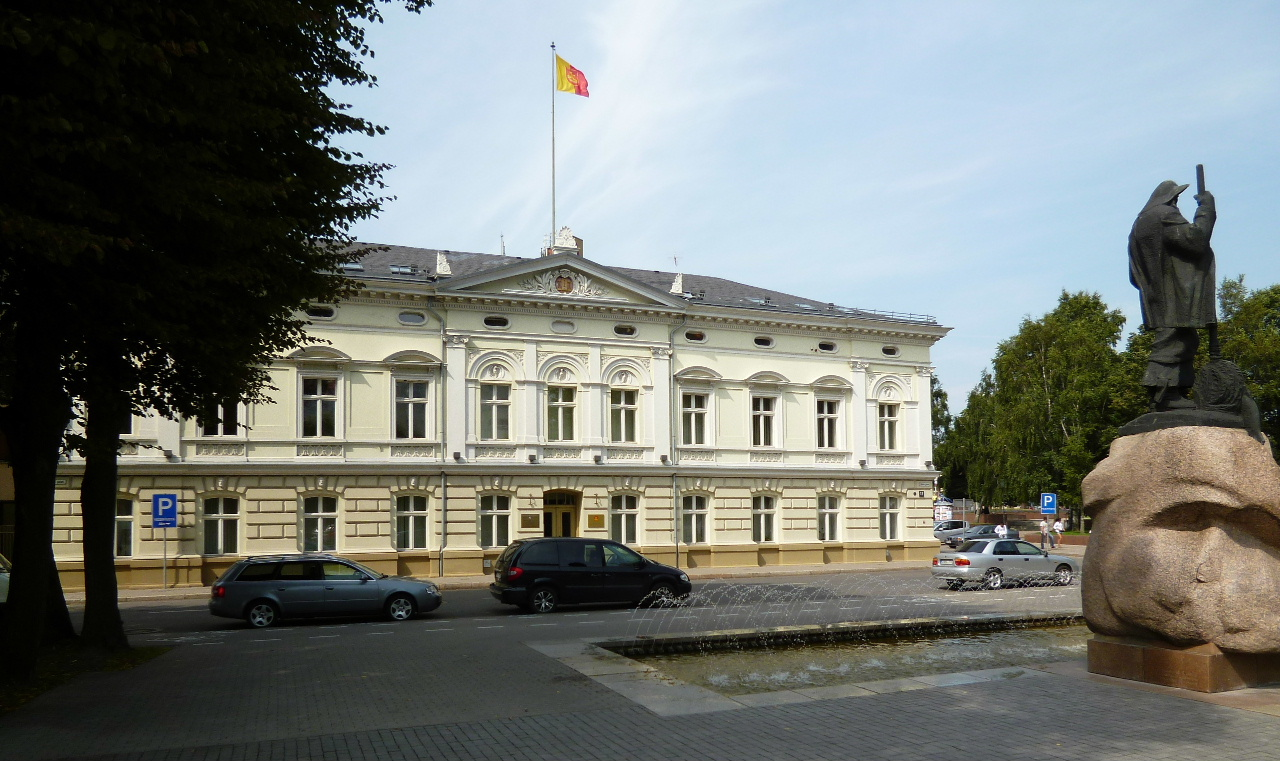
Headquarters of Parliament

The Parliament of the Klaipėda Region (Chamber of Representatives of the Memel Territory, Lithuanian: Seimelis) was the parliament of the Klaipėda Region (Memel Territory), an autonomous region of Lithuania. The parliament was established by the Klaipėda Convention of 1924 and the first elections took place in October 1925.

== History ==
According to the Treaty of Versailles of 1919, the Klaipėda Region (Memel Territory) was detached from East Prussia, German Empire, and placed under temporary administration of the League of Nations. After the Klaipėda Revolt in January 1923, the region was transferred to Lithuania on condition that it would abide by the Klaipėda Convention, signed in May 1924 and fully effective in August 1925. The Convention included the Statute of the Klaipėda Region, which described region's legislative, judicial, administrative, and financial autonomy. The Convention also established the framework of the autonomous institutions – the local parliament and the Klaipėda Directorate (executive branch). The parliament was to be democratically elected for three-year terms by the local inhabitants in the proportion of one representative per 5,000 residents. The parliament confirmed and dismissed the Directorate, appointed by the Governor. The Directorate and the Lithuanian-appointed Governor could dismiss the parliament; in such a case, the new elections had to be called within six weeks. The Governor could veto laws passed by the parliament, but only if they violated the Convention, Constitution of Lithuania, or other international agreements. Of the 165 laws passed between 1925 and 1938, 62 were vetoed. The parliament was in charge of region's education, religious affairs, public health and welfare, local infrastructure, civil, criminal, and economic legislature, finances, court organization, etc.

In all elections 29 representatives were elected, and pro-German parties won a clear supermajority. The pro-German parliament often clashed with the more pro-Lithuanian Directorate. The first three parliaments were dismissed by the Directorate and the Governor. In the 1932 case, the Permanent Court of International Justice ruled that the Lithuanians erred in dismissing the third parliament. After the crisis surrounding the trial of the Nazi activists, the 1935 election was postponed by the Lithuanians beyond the six-week period allowed by the Convention in hopes to build a pro-Lithuanian momentum. The election law was also changed – the voters now had to submit 29 separate ballots for each individual they preferred, rather than a single ballot for a party. The German parties submitted a single unified list, while Lithuanian parties presented six. The parliament was disbanded after the ultimatum of March 1939 and subsequent Nazi German takeover of the region.

== Speakers of the Parliament ==
Speakers
Name	Period	Party
Joseph Kraus	1925–1927	Memel People's Party
Konrad von Dressler	1927–1935	Memel Agricultural Party
August Baldszus	1935	Unified German list
Christoph Dietschmons	(1936–1938)	Unified German list

== Election results ==
Election date	Total		Lithuanian Parties			Memel Agricultural Party			Memel People's Party			Social Democratic Party of the Memel Territory			Memel Workers Party			Other		
Election date	Votes	Turnout	Votes	%	Seats	Votes	%	Seats	Votes	%	Seats	Votes	%	Seats	Votes	%	Seats	Votes	%	Seats
1925-10-19	62,517	83.5%	3,761	6.0%	2	23,824	38.1%	11	23,082	36.9%	11	10,010	16.0%	5	1,564	2.5%	–	276	0.4%	–
1927-08-30	54,746		7,311	13.4%	4	18,776	34.3%	10	17,636	32.2%	10	5,712	10.4%	3	3,844	7.0%	2	1,467	2.7%	–
1930-10-10	49,630		8,817	17.8%	5	15,810	31.8%	10	13,709	27.6%	8	6,780	13.7%	4	2,062	4.2%	2	2,452	4.9%	–
1932-05-04	65,767		11,968	18.2%	5	24,468	37.2%	11	17,930	27.3%	8	5,104	7.7%	2	5,401	8.2%	3	896	1.4%	–
			Lithuanian lists			Unified German list (Note: Memelländische Einheitsliste in 1935, Memeldeutsche Einheitsliste in 1938)			Part of the German list									None		
1935-09-29	1,962,061	91.3%	369,457	18.3%	5	1,592,604	81.7%	24												
1938-12-11	2,095,206	96%	268,585	12.8%	4	1,826,621	87.2%	25												

Main source: Žostautaitė, Petronėlė (1992). Klaipėdos kraštas: 1923-1939 (in Lithuanian). Mokslas. pp. 70–71. ISBN 978-5-420-00724-2.
