= Klaipėda =

Coastal city in Lithuania

Klaipėda: Memel (German); Klaipieda (Samogitian)
- City
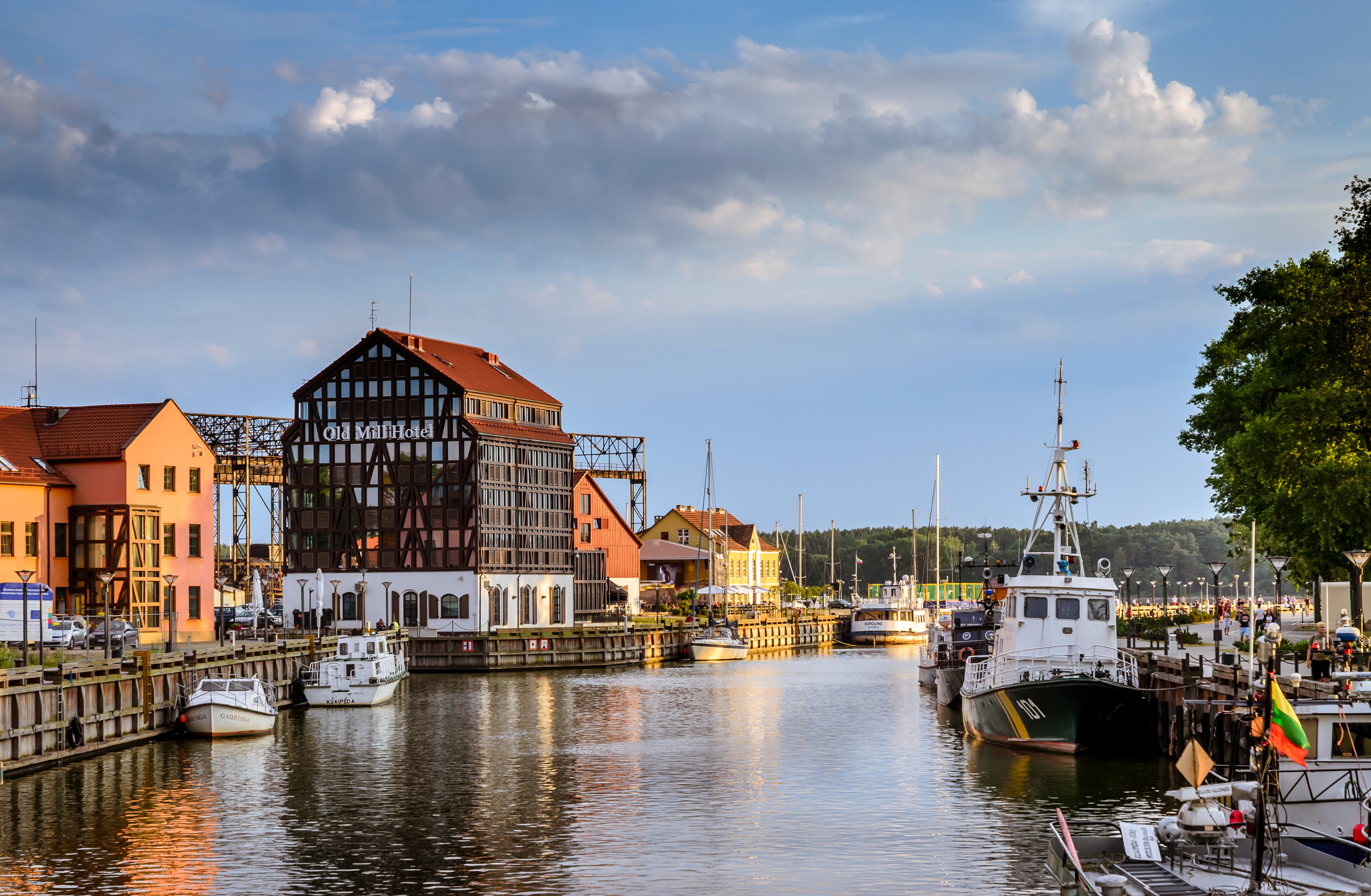
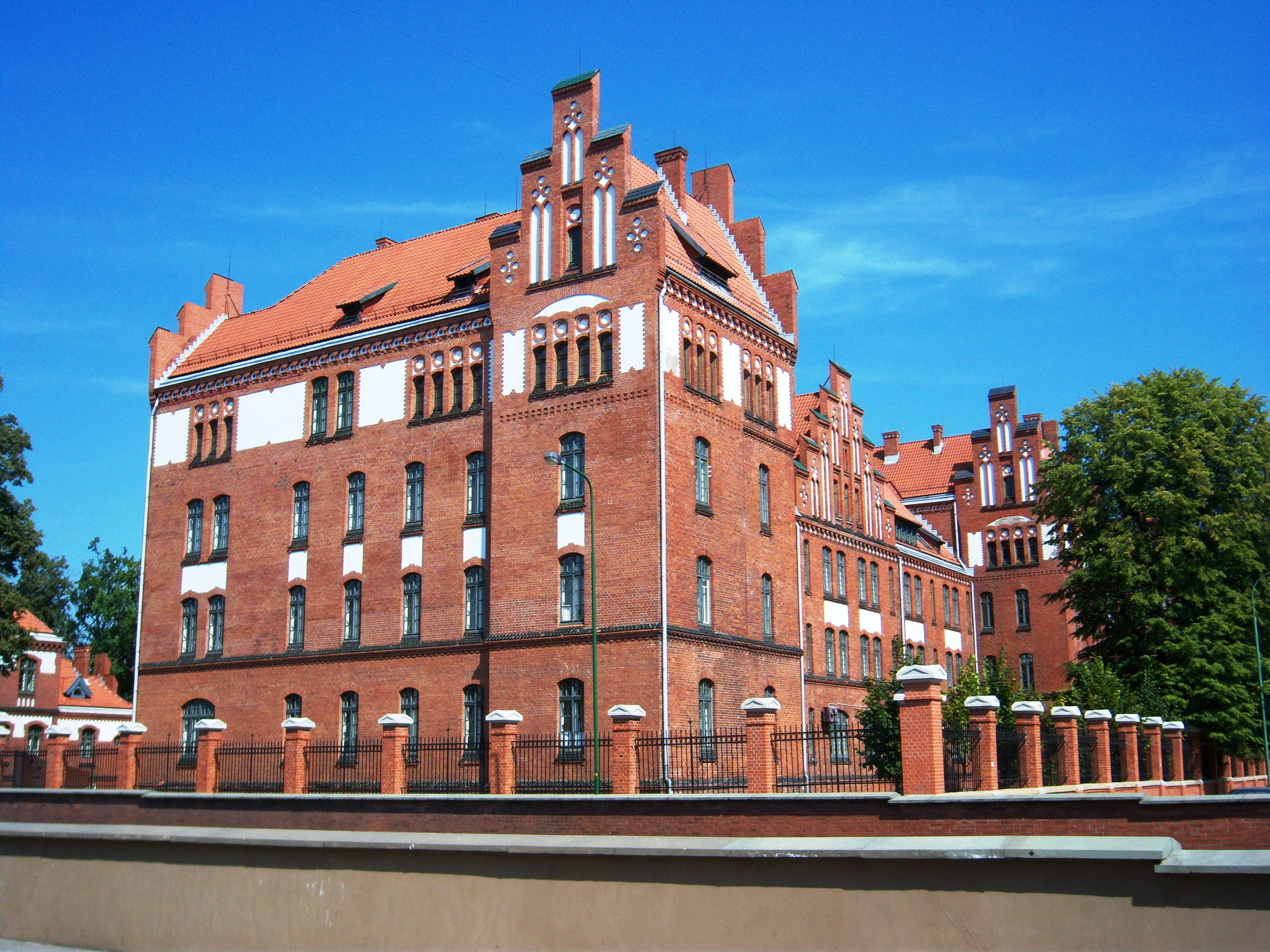
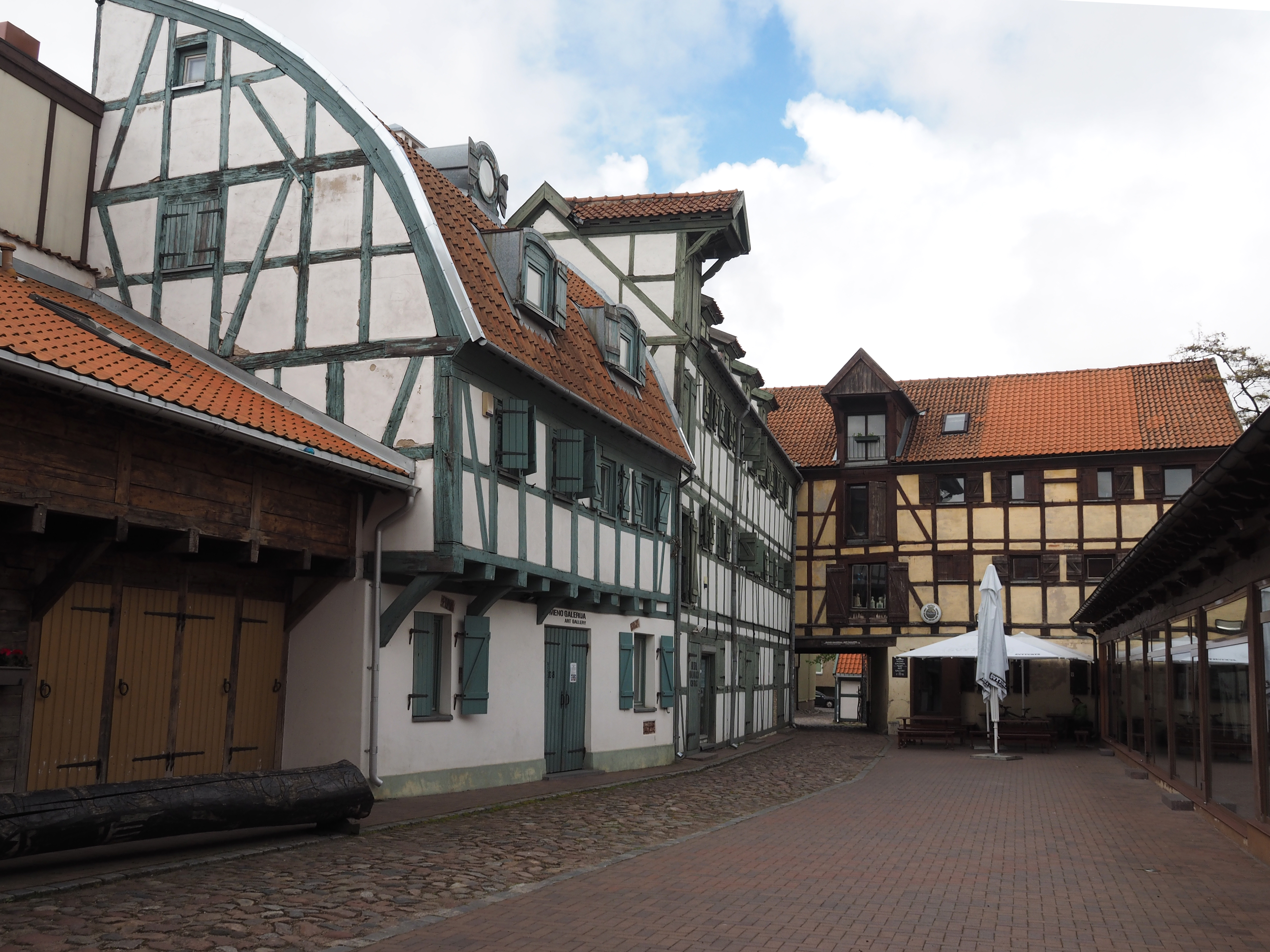
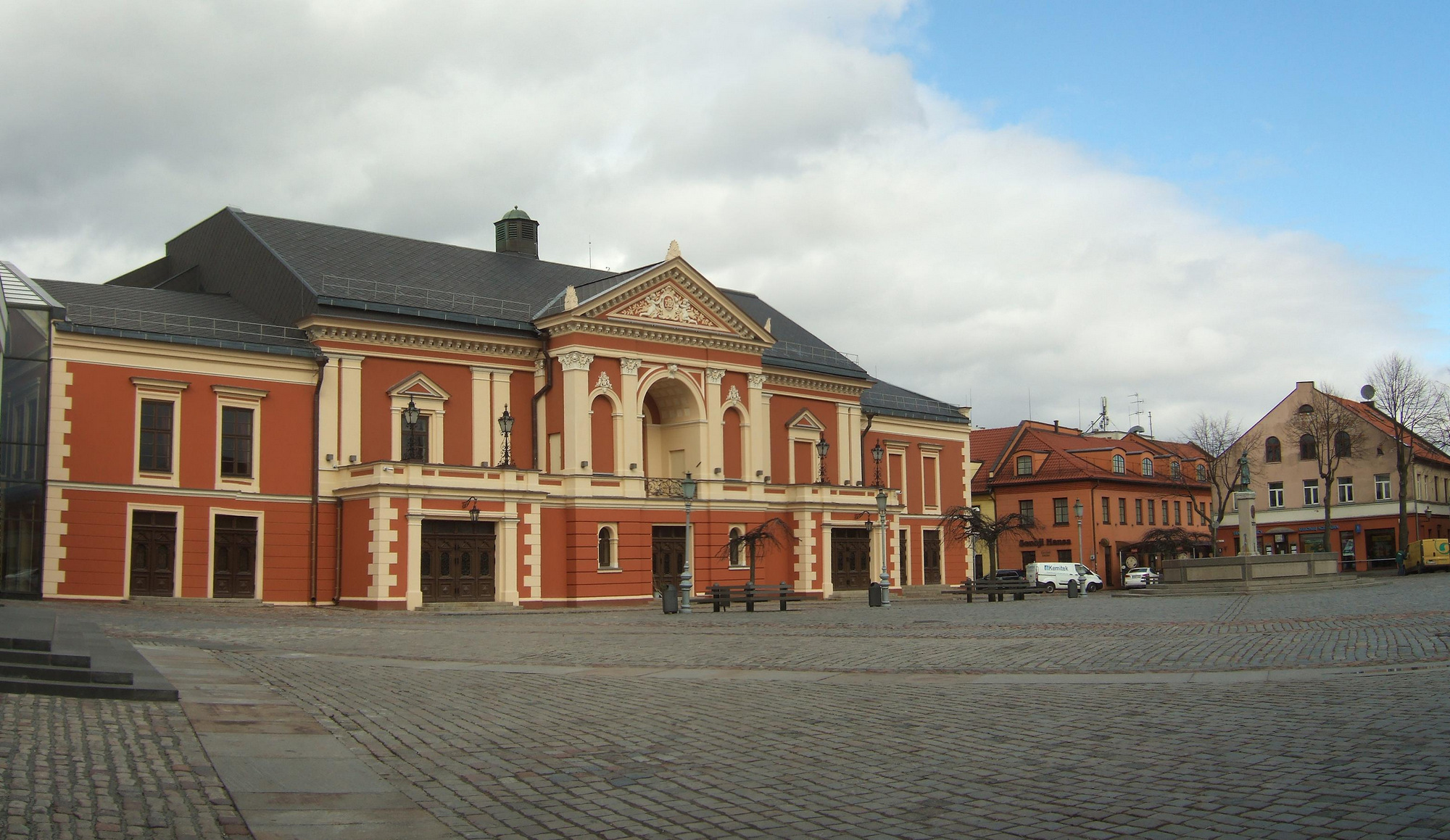
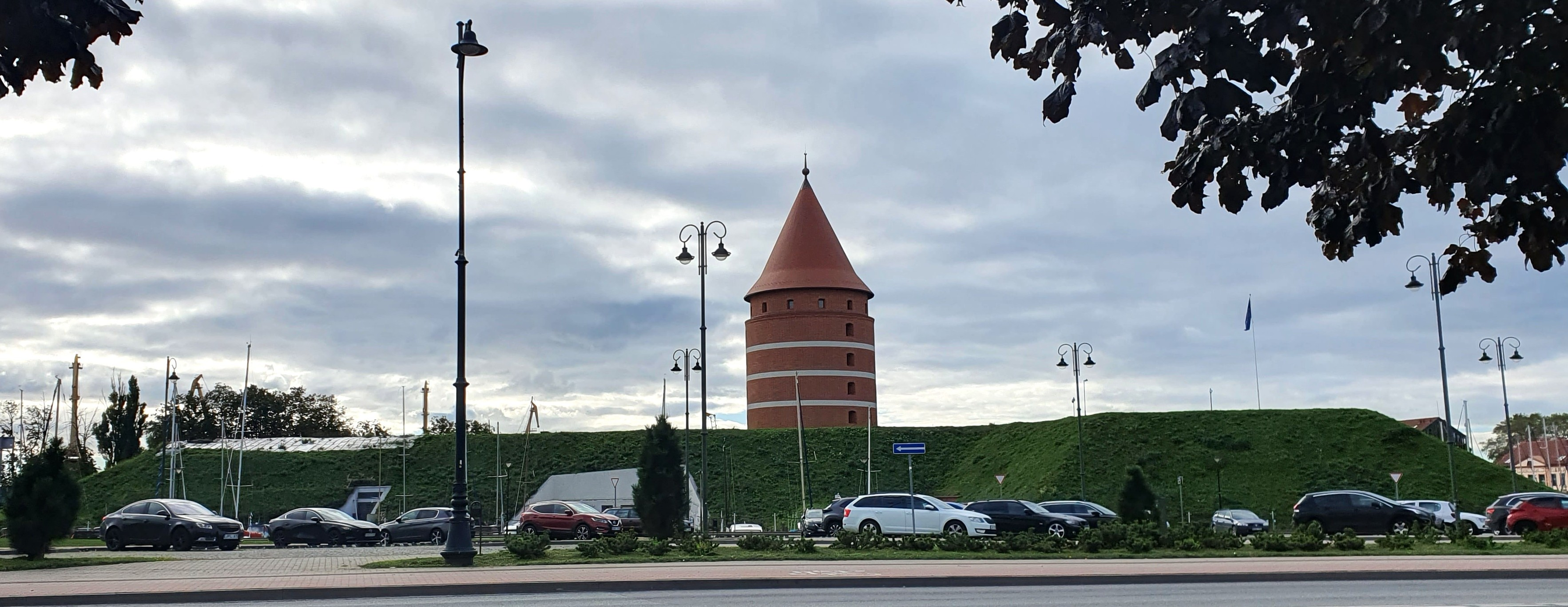
- Port of Klaipėda Klaipėda University Timber framed houses in the old town Theatre Square Klaipėda Castle

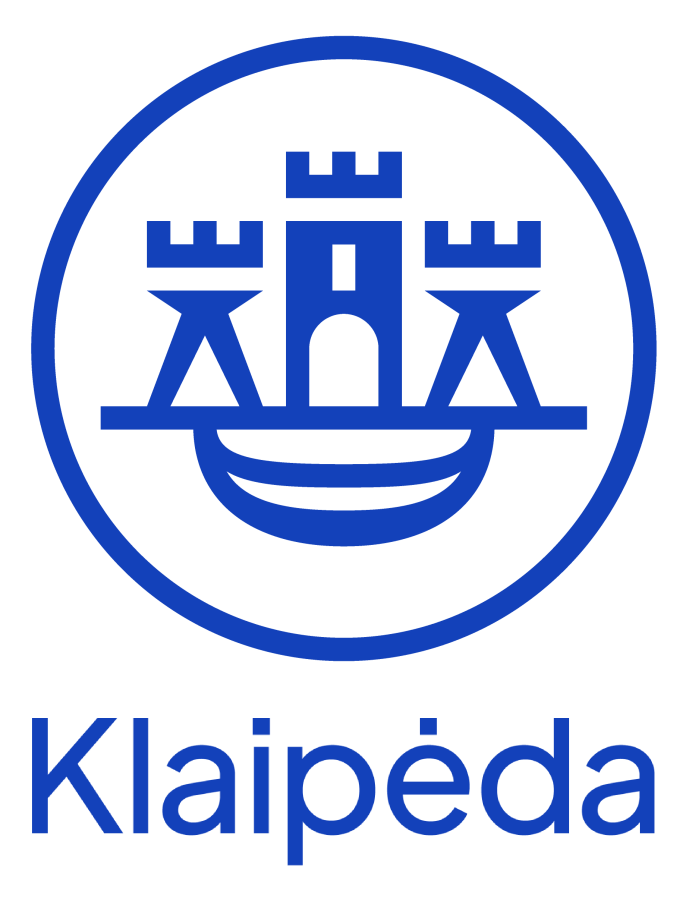
- Flag Coat of arms Brandmark
- Nickname: Uostamiestis (port city)
- Interactive map of Klaipėda
- Location of Klaipėda in Lithuania Location of Klaipėda within the Baltics Location of Klaipėda in Europe
- Coordinates: 55°42′45″N 21°08′06″E
- Country: Lithuania
- Ethnographic region: Lithuania Minor
- County: Klaipėda County
- Municipality: Klaipėda city municipality
- Capital of: Klaipėda County; Klaipėda city municipality
- First mentioned: 1252
- Granted city rights: 1258

Area
  - City: 98.2 km^{2} (37.9 sq mi)
  - Metro: 1,434 km^{2} (554 sq mi)
- Elevation: 21 m (69 ft)

Population (2025)
  - City: 160,979
  - Density: 1,640/km^{2} (4,250/sq mi)
  - Metro: 228,748 (Note: including Klaipėda district municipality)
  - Metro density: 146/km^{2} (380/sq mi)
- Demonym(s): Klaipėdian(s) (English) klaipėdiškiai (Lithuanian)

GDP
  - Metro: €8.1 billion (2024)
- Time zone: UTC+2 (EET)
  - Summer (DST): UTC+3 (EEST)
- Postal code: 91100-96226
- Area code: (+370) 46
- City budget: €0.5 billion (2026)
- Climate: Cfb
- Website: klaipeda.lt

Klaipėda (/ˈkleɪpɛdə/ KLAY-ped-ə, Lithuanian: [ˈklˠɐɪ̯ˑpʲeːdˠɐ]; Samogitian: Klaipieda; German: Memel) is a city in Lithuania on the Baltic Sea coast. It is the third-largest city in Lithuania, the fifth-largest city in the Baltic states, the capital of Klaipėda County, the only major seaport in the country and the busiest port in the Baltic states.

The city has a diverse recorded history, partially due to the combined regional importance of the usually ice-free port at the mouth of the river Akmena-Danė. It was situated in Lithuania Minor and successively belonged to the State of the Teutonic Order, the Duchy of Prussia (at times under the suzerainty of the Polish–Lithuanian Commonwealth), the Kingdom of Prussia and the German Empire, within which it was the northernmost big city until it was placed under French occupation in 1919. From 1923, the city was part of Lithuania until its annexation by Nazi Germany in 1939, and after World War II it was part of the Lithuanian Soviet Socialist Republic. Klaipėda has remained within Lithuania since 1944.

The urban zone of Klaipėda expanded well into the suburbs, which sprang up around the city and surrounded it from three sides. These are partly integrated with the city (city bus lines, city water supply, etc.), and the majority of inhabitants of these suburbs work in Klaipėda. According to data from the Department of Statistics, there are 233,091 permanent inhabitants (as of July 2026) in the Klaipėda city and Klaipėda district municipalities combined (up from 212,302 in 2020). As of 2025, the population of Klaipėda city is 160,885 people. Popular seaside resorts found close to Klaipėda are Neringa to the south on the Curonian Spit, and Palanga to the north.

The city is also known for the annual Klaipėda Sea Festival and a nearby Lithuanian Sea Museum which is in the old Prussian starfort of Fort Kopgalis.

== Names ==
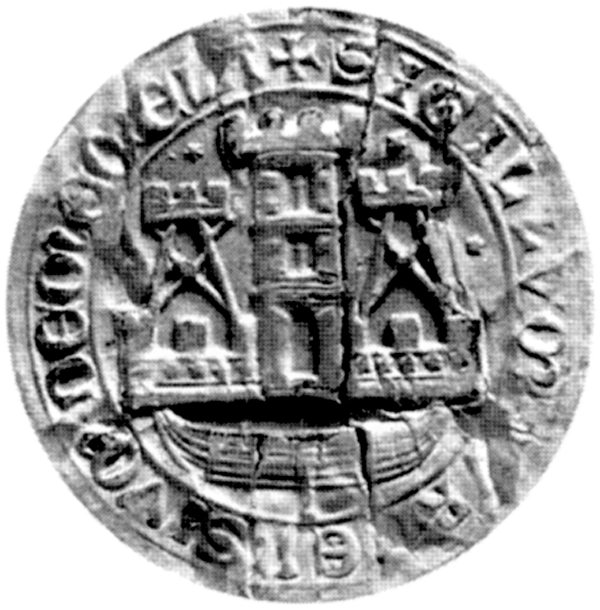
Memel city seal, 1446 (diameter 200 mm (7.9 in)). From the Archive of the Prussian Cultural Heritage Foundation, Berlin.

The Teutonic Knights built a castle in the *Pilsāts Land of the Curonians and named it Memelburg, which would later be shortened to Memel. From 1252 to 1923 and from 1939 to 1945, the town and city were officially named Memel. Between 1923 and 1939, both names were in official use. Since 1945, the Lithuanian name of Klaipėda has been used.

The names Memelburg and Memel are found in most written sources from the 13th century onwards, while Klaipėda is found in Lithuanian sources since the 15th century. The city was initially mentioned as Caloypede in the letter of Vytautas in 1413, and in negotiation documents from 1420, the city was named Klawppeda. In the Treaty of Melno of 1422, the city's name was listed as Cleupeda. According to Samogitian folk etymology, the name Klaipėda refers to the boggy terrain of the town (klaidyti=obstruct and pėda=foot). Most likely, the name is of Curonian origin and means "even ground"; it likely originates from a combination of "klais/klait" (flat, open, free) and "peda" (sole of the foot, ground), as a reference to relatively flat terrain of the original settlement's surroundings.

The lower reaches of the river Neman were named either *Mēmele or *Mēmela by Scalovians and local Curonian inhabitants. In the Latvian Curonian language, it means mute, silent (memelis, mimelis, mēms), as a reference to peaceful flow of the Neman. This name was adopted by German speakers, and also was chosen for the new city founded further away at the lagoon.

The name of the city in the Samogitian language is spelled slightly differently: Klaipieda. The most notable non-Lithuanian names include: Latvian: Klaipēda; Polish: Kłajpeda; Russian: Клайпеда; German: Memel.

== Coat of arms ==
The coat of arms of Klaipėda is also used as the coat of arms of the Klaipėda city municipality. The modern version was created by the designer Kęstutis Mickevičius. The modern coat of arms was created by restoring old seals of the Memel city (analogous with those used in the years 1446, 1605 and 1618). It was affirmed on 1 July 1992.

== History ==
A settlement of Baltic tribes in the territory of the present-day city is said to have existed in the region as early as the 7th century. Klaipėda is one of the oldest cities in modern Lithuania. The Balts initially established Klaipėda as a trading centre for the storage of goods and annual fairs with the Germans.

=== Teutonic Knights ===
In the 1240s, Pope Gregory IX offered King Håkon IV of Norway the opportunity to conquer the peninsula of Sambia. However, after Grand Duke Mindaugas of Lithuania accepted Christianity, the Teutonic Knights and a group of crusaders from Lübeck moved into Sambia. These groups founded a fort in 1252 called Memele castrum (or Memelburg, "Memel Castle"). The fort's construction was completed in 1253, and Memel was garrisoned with troops of the Teutonic Order, administered by Deutschmeister Eberhard von Seyne. Documents for its founding were signed by Eberhard and Bishop Heinrich von Lützelburg of Courland on 29 July 1252 and 1 August 1252.

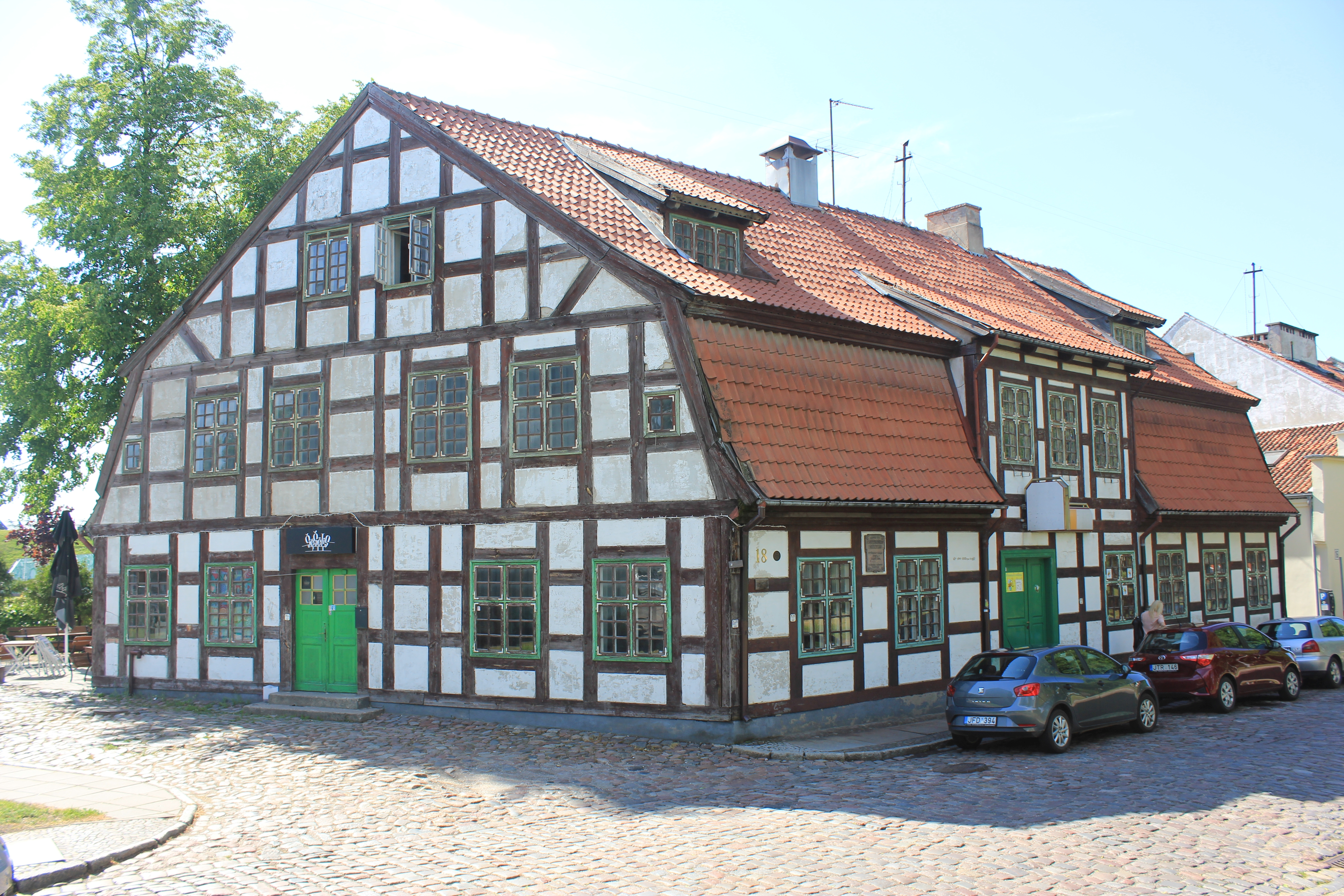
Preserved historic timber framed architecture

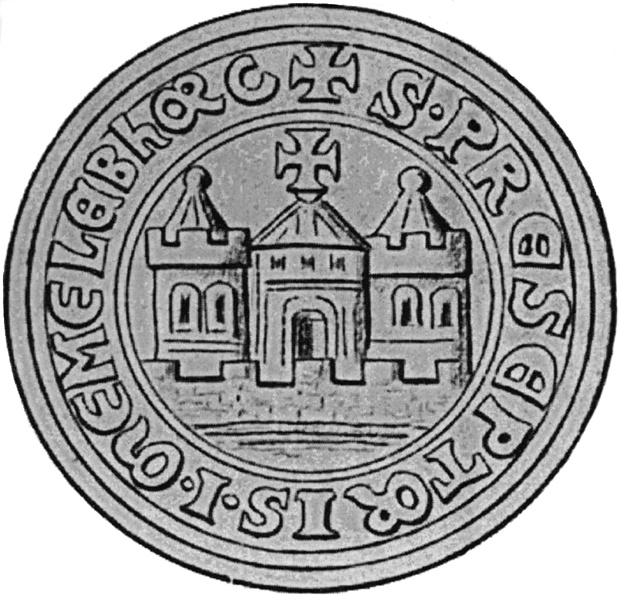
Seal of viceregent in Klaipėda, 13th century

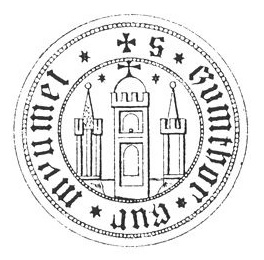
Seal of Klaipėda as of 1409 depicting bell towers of the Churches of St. John, St. Mary and St. Nicholas

Master Conrad von Thierberg used the fortress as a base for further campaigns along the river Neman and against Samogitia. Memel was unsuccessfully besieged by Sambians in 1255, and the Sambians surrendered in 1259. Memel was also colonized by settlers from Holstein, Lübeck and Dortmund. Hence, Memel also being known at the time as Neu-Dortmund, or "New Dortmund". It became the main town of the Diocese of Curonia, with a cathedral and at least two parochial churches, but the development of the castle became the dominant priority. According to different sources, Memel received Lübeck city rights in 1254 or 1258. Following it Klaipėda's status was quite extraordinary as only three cities in the State of the Teutonic Order had Lübeck city rights.

In the spring and summer of 1323, a Lithuanian army led by Grand Duke Gediminas came up the Neman and sieged the castle of Memel, while later he marched to other Prussian, Latvian, Estonian territories controlled by the Order, eventually forcing the Order to sue for a truce in October 1323. While planning a campaign against Samogitia, Memel's garrison of the Teutonic Order's Livonian branch was replaced with knights from the Prussian branch in 1328. Threats and attacks by Lithuanians greatly slowed the town's development; the castle was sacked by Lithuanian state in 1360, and in 1379 the reconstructed castle and town were both sacked once again. In 1409, the castle was rebuilt and in 1422–1441 the strengthening of the castle's fortifications continued when eventually its ramparts reached 7 meters height.

After the Battle of Grunwald, the dispute between the Grand Duchy of Lithuania and the Teutonic Order on Samogitia started. Vytautas the Great wanted the border to be the Neman River, while the Teutonic Order wanted to have Veliuona and Klaipėda in the right side of the river. Both sides agreed to accept the prospective solution of Emperor Sigismund's representative Benedict Makrai in 1413. He decided that the right side of Nemunas (Veliuona, Klaipėda) were to be owned by Lithuania. Makrai is known to have stated:

We find that the Memel Castle is built in the land of Samogitians. Neither Master, nor the Order was able to prove anything opposing.

Nevertheless, no agreement was concluded and fighting continued until the Treaty of Melno in 1422 stabilized the border between the Teutonic Order and the Grand Duchy of Lithuania for the next 501 years. However, two miles of Lithuanian territories, including Klaipėda, was left for the Order. In 1454, King Casimir IV Jagiellon incorporated the region into the Kingdom of Poland upon the request of the anti-Teutonic Prussian Confederation. After the subsequent Thirteen Years' War (1454–1466) the Teutonic Order regained authority over the city as a fief of the Polish Crown. The rebuilt town received Kulm law city rights in 1475.

=== Duchy of Prussia ===
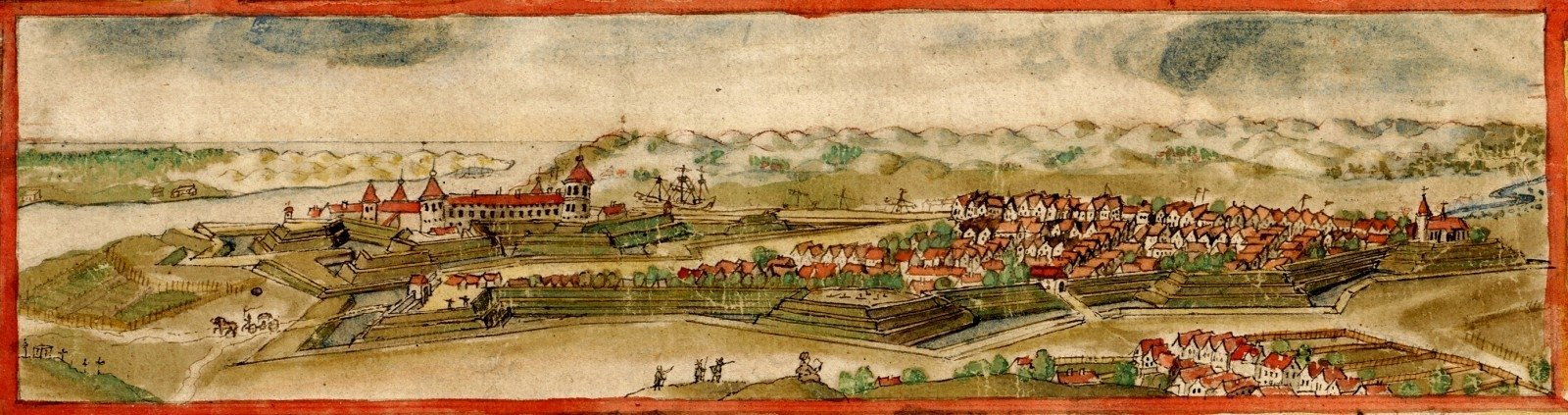
Panorama of the city with the Klaipėda Castle and the old town in 1674

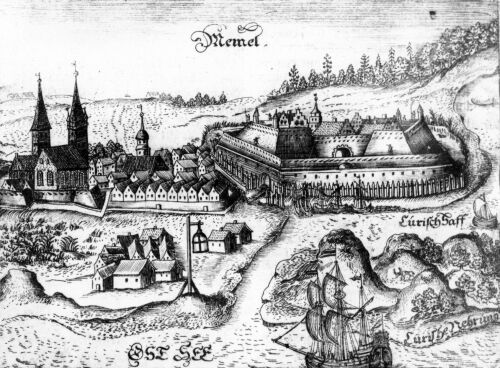
Historical illustration of Memel (1684)

Against the wishes of its governor and commander, Eric of Brunswick-Wolfenbüttel, Memel adopted Lutheranism after the conversion of Grand Master Albert of Prussia and the creation of the Duchy of Prussia as a fief of the Crown of the Kingdom of Poland in 1525, soon part of the Polish–Lithuanian Commonwealth. Since then, Klaipėda has become the county centre within the Duchy of Prussia. It was the onset of a long period of prosperity for the city and port. Klaipėda served as a port for neighbouring Lithuania, benefiting from its location near the mouth of the Neman, with wheat as a profitable export. The Duchy of Prussia was inherited by a relative, John Sigismund, the Hohenzollern prince-electors of the Margraviate of Brandenburg in 1618. Brandenburg-Prussia began active participation in regional policy, which affected the development of Memel. From 1629 to 1635, the town was occupied by Sweden over several periods during the Polish-Swedish War of 1626–1629.

After the Treaty of Königsberg in 1656 during the Northern Wars, Elector Frederick William opened Memel's harbor to Sweden, with whom the harbor's revenue was divided. Sovereignty of the margraves of Brandenburg over the region was affirmed in the Treaty of Oliva in 1660.

The construction of a fortified defence system around the entire town, initiated in 1627, noticeably changed its status and prospects. In November 1678 a small Swedish army invaded the Prussian territory, but was unable to capture the fortress of Memel.

=== Kingdom of Prussia ===
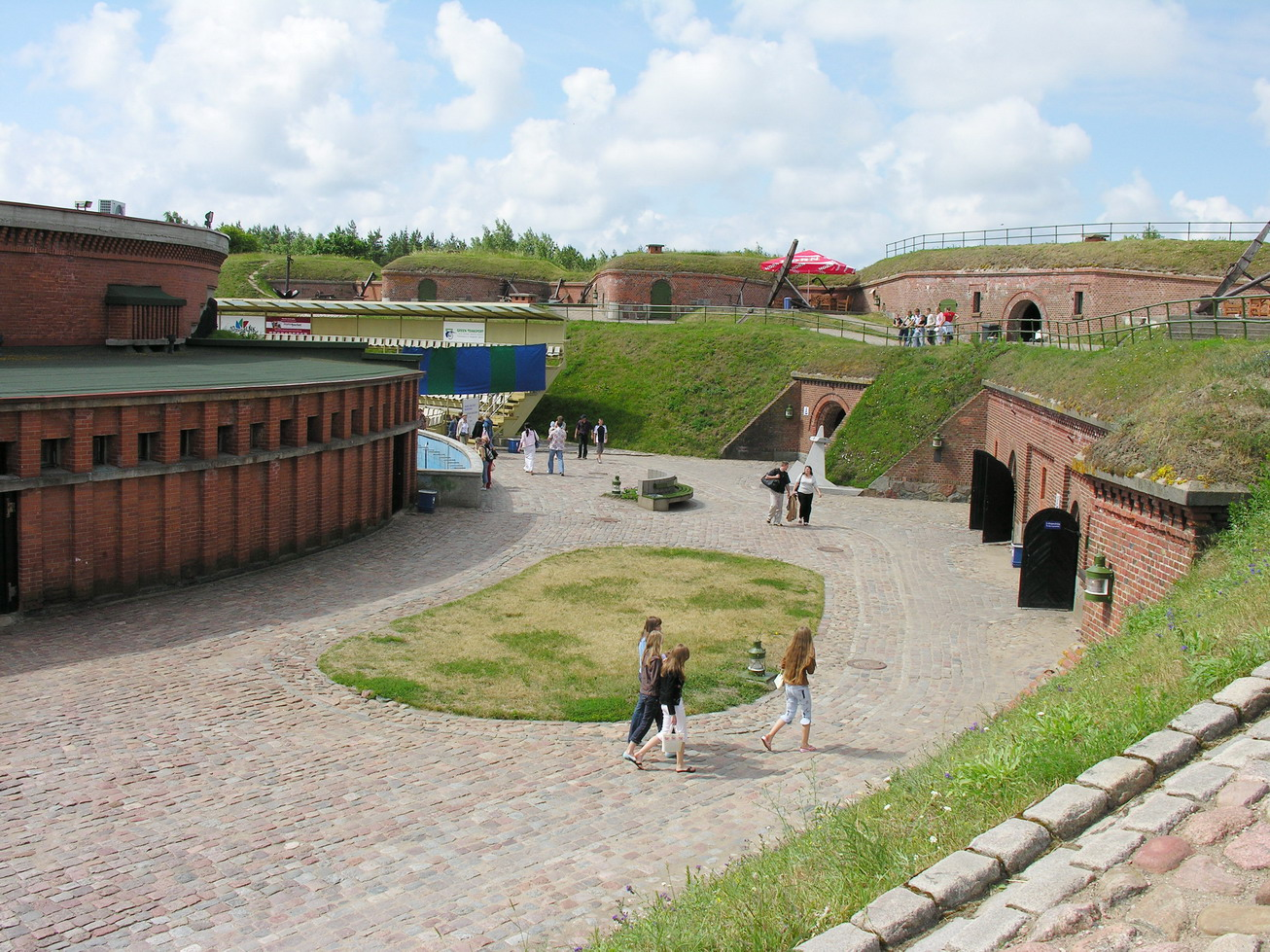
Spit fortress

By the beginning of the 18th century, Memel was one of the strongest fortresses (Memelfestung) in Prussia, and the town became part of the Kingdom of Prussia in 1701. Despite its fortifications, it was besieged and captured by Russian troops during a Siege . Consequently, from 1757 to 1762 the town, along with the rest of eastern Prussia, was dependent on the Russian Empire. After this war ended, the maintenance of the fortress was neglected, but the town's growth continued.

Memel became part of the newly formed province of East Prussia within the Kingdom of Prussia in 1773. In the second half of the 18th century, Memel's lax customs and Riga's high duties enticed English traders, who established the first industrial sawmills in the town. In 1784, 996 ships arrived in Memel, 500 of which were English. The specialisation in wood manufacturing guaranteed Memel's merchants income and stability for more than a hundred years. During this era, it also normalised its trade relations with Königsberg; regional instability had degraded relations since the 16th century.

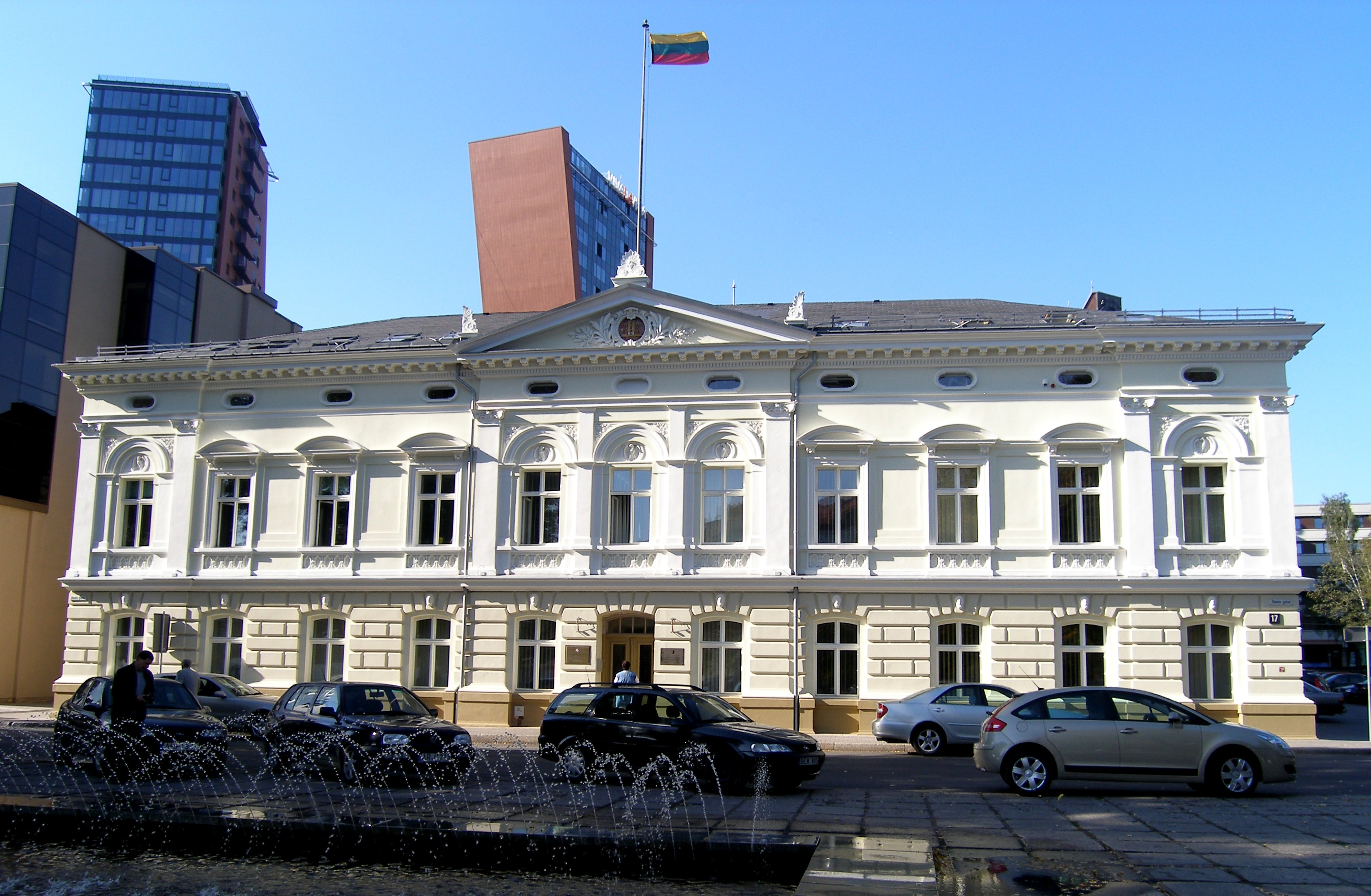
Klaipėda Town Hall was the temporary residence of the King Frederick William III of Prussia, his wife Queen Louise and their children.

Memel prospered during the second half of the 18th century by exporting timber to Great Britain for use by the Royal Navy. In 1792, 756 British ships visited the town to transport lumber from forests near Memel. In 1800, its imports consisted chiefly of salt, iron and herrings; the exports, which greatly exceeded the imports, were corn, hemp, flax, and, particularly, timber. The 1815 Encyclopædia Britannica stated that Memel was "provided with the finest harbour in the Baltic".

During the Napoleonic Wars, Memel became the temporary capital of the Kingdom of Prussia. Between 1807 and 1808, the town was the residence of King Frederick William III, his consort Louise, his court, and the government. On 9 October 1807 the king signed a document in Memel, later called the October Edict, which abolished serfdom in Prussia. It originated the reforms of Karl Freiherr vom und zum Stein and Karl August von Hardenberg. The land around Memel suffered major economic setbacks under Napoleon Bonaparte's Continental System. During Napoleon's retreat from Moscow after the failed invasion of Russia in 1812, General Yorck refused Marshal MacDonald's orders to fortify Memel at Prussia's expense.

During the January Uprising, in June 1863, Polish insurgents made an unsuccessful attempt at a naval landing near the city's harbor.

=== German Empire ===
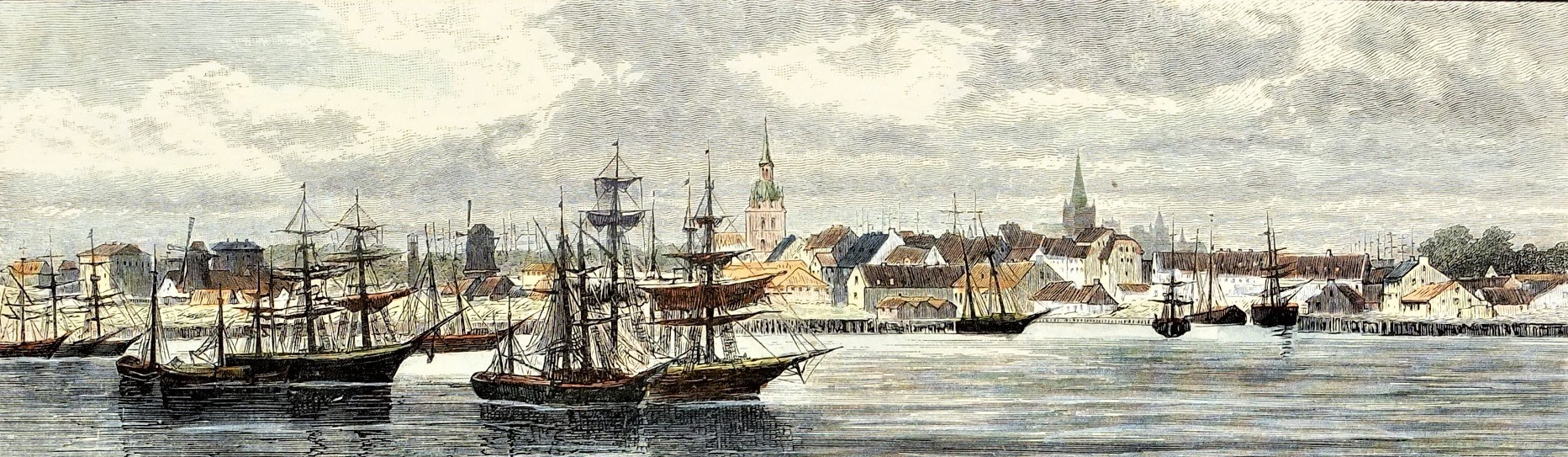
Panorama of the city from the Curonian Lagoon in 1880

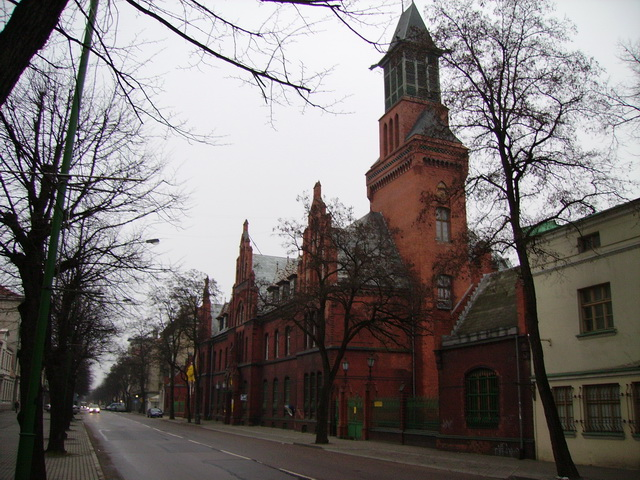
Central Post Office, the former residence of Friedrich Wilhelm Argelander and monarchs of Prussia

After the unification of Germany into the German Empire in 1871, Memel became Germany's northernmost city.

The development of the town in the 19th century was influenced by the Industrial Revolution in Prussia, as well as urbanisation. Even though the population of Memel increased fourfold during the 19th century, and had risen to 21,470 by 1910, its pace of development lagged in comparison. The reasons for this were mostly political. Memel was the northernmost and easternmost city in Germany, and although the government was engaged in a very costly tree-planting exercise to stabilise the sand-dunes on the Curonian Spit, most of the financial infusions in the province of East Prussia were concentrated in Königsberg, the capital of the province. Some notable instances of the German infrastructure investments in the area included sandbar blasting and a new ship canal between Pillau and Königsberg, which enabled vessels of up to 6.5 m draughts to moor alongside the city, at a cost of 13 million marks.

Owing to the absence of heavy industry in the 1870s and 1880s, the population of Memel stagnated, although wood manufacturing persisted as the main industry. It remained the central point of the Baltic timber-trade. A British Consul was located in the town in 1800; in 1900 a British Vice-Consul was recorded there, as well as a Lloyd's Agent.

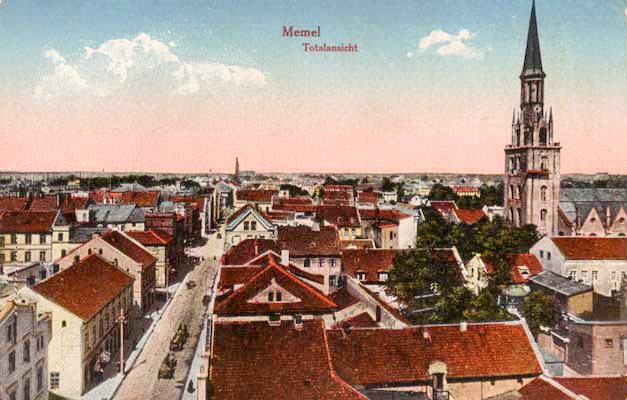
Early 20th-century view of the city featuring the Church of St. John

By 1900 steamer services had been established between Memel and Cranz (on the southern end of the Curonian Spit), and also between Memel and Tilsit. A main-line railway was built from Insterburg, the main East Prussian railway junction, to St. Petersburg via Eydtkuhnen, the Prussian frontier station. The Memel line also ran from Insterburg via Tilsit, where a further direct line connected with Königsberg, that crossed the 4-kilometre-wide (2 1/2-mile) Memel Valley over three bridges before its arrival in Memel.

During the second half of the 19th century, Memel was a center for the publication of books printed in the Lithuanian language using a Latin-script alphabet – these publications were prohibited in the nearby Russian Empire of which Lithuania was a province. The books were then smuggled over the Lithuanian border.

The German 1910 census lists the Memel Territory population as 149,766, of whom 67,345 declared Lithuanian to be their first language. The Germans greatly predominated in the town and port of Memel as well as in other nearby villages; the Lithuanian population was predominant in the area's rural districts.

=== Inter-war years and World War II ===
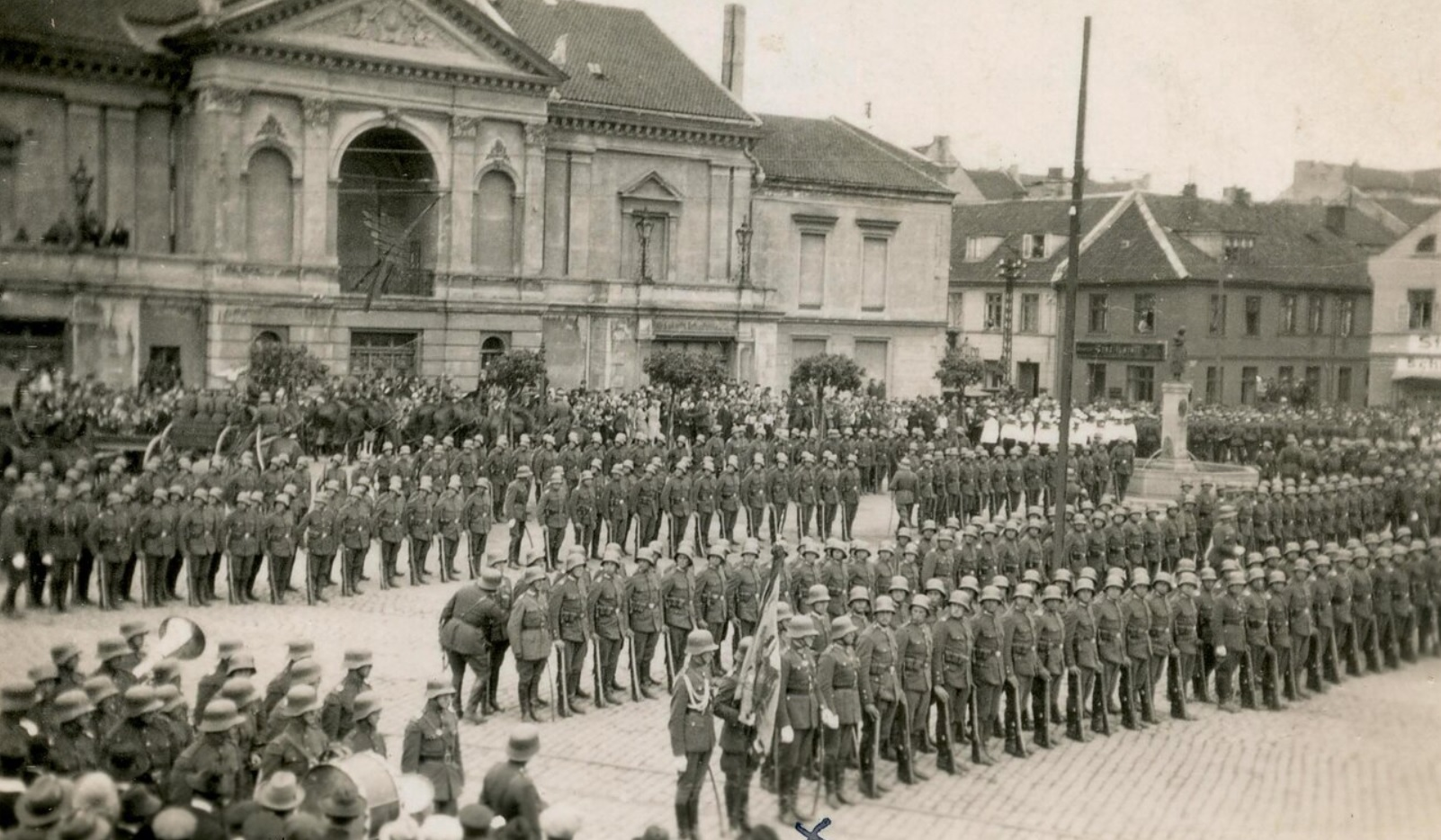
Lithuanian Army parade in Klaipėda Theatre Square in 1923

Under the Treaty of Versailles after World War I, Klaipėda and the surrounding Klaipėda Region (Memel Territory) were detached from Germany and made a protectorate of the Entente States. The French became provisional administrators of the region until a more permanent solution could be worked out. Both Lithuania and Poland campaigned for their rights in the region. However, it seemed that the region would become a free city, similar to the Free City of Danzig. Not waiting for an unfavourable decision, the Lithuanians decided to stage the Klaipėda Revolt, take the region by force, and present the Entente with a fait accompli. The revolt was carried out in January 1923 while western Europe was distracted by the occupation of the Ruhr. The Germans tacitly supported the action, and the French offered only limited resistance. The revolt was supported by the Chief Rescue Committee of Lithuania Minor, chaired by Prussian Lithuanian Martynas Jankus, which operated since 22 December 1922 with its centre in Klaipėda. The League of Nations protested the revolt but accepted the transfer in February 1923. The formal Klaipėda Convention was signed in Paris on 8 May 1924 and secured extensive autonomy for the region.

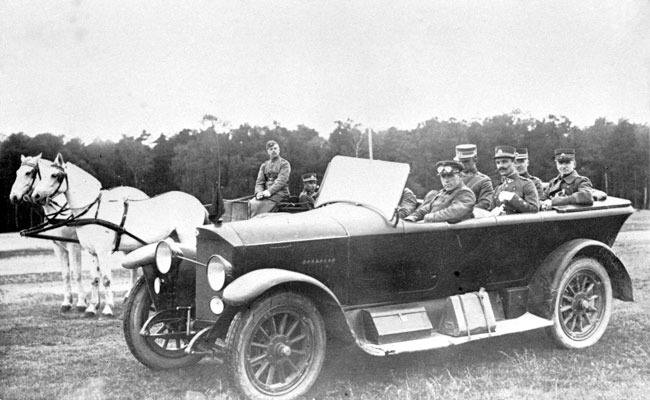
Supreme Commander of the Lithuanian Army Silvestras Žukauskas in Klaipėda, 1925

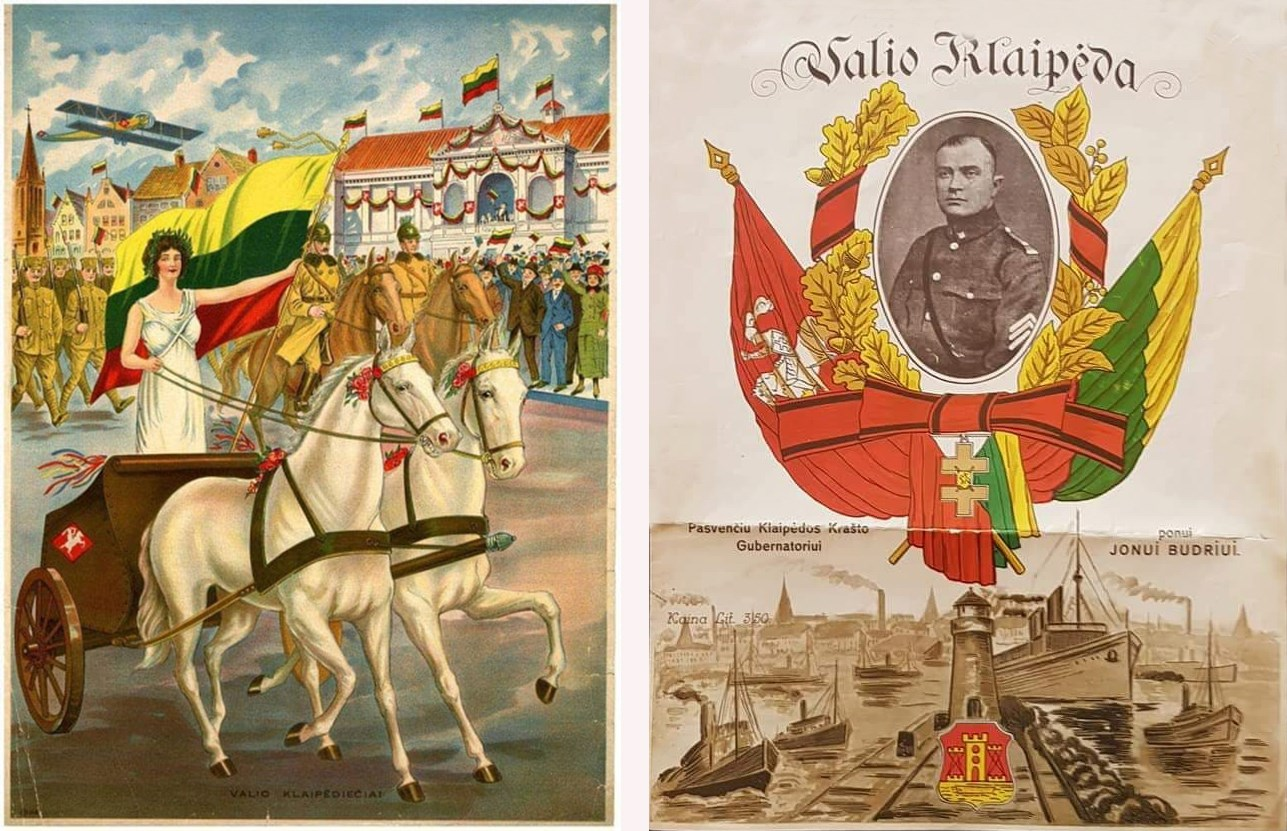
Two 1920s posters, representing the historical attachment of Klaipėda to Lithuania in 1923

The annexation of the city had significant consequences for the Lithuanian economy and foreign relations. The region subsequently accounted for up to 30% of Lithuania's entire economic production. Between 70% and 80% of foreign trade passed through Klaipėda. The region, which represented only about 5% of Lithuania's territory, contained a third of its industry.

Weimar Germany, under Foreign Minister Gustav Stresemann, maintained normal relations with Lithuania. However, Nazi Germany desired to reacquire the region and tensions rose. Pro-German parties won clear supermajorities in all elections to the Klaipėda Parliament, which often clashed with the Lithuanian-appointed Klaipėda Directorate. Lithuanian efforts to "re-Lithuanize" Prussian Lithuanians by promoting the Lithuanian language, culture, education were often met with resistance from the locals. In 1932, a conflict between the Parliament and the Directorate had to be resolved by the Permanent Court of International Justice. In 1934–1935, the Lithuanians attempted to combat increasing Nazi influence in the region by arresting and prosecuting over 120 Nazi activists for the alleged plot to organize an anti-Lithuanian rebellion. Despite these rather harsh sentences, the defendants in the Neumann–Sass case were soon released under pressure from Nazi Germany. The extensive autonomy guaranteed by the Klaipėda Convention prevented Lithuania from blocking the growing pro-German attitudes in the region.

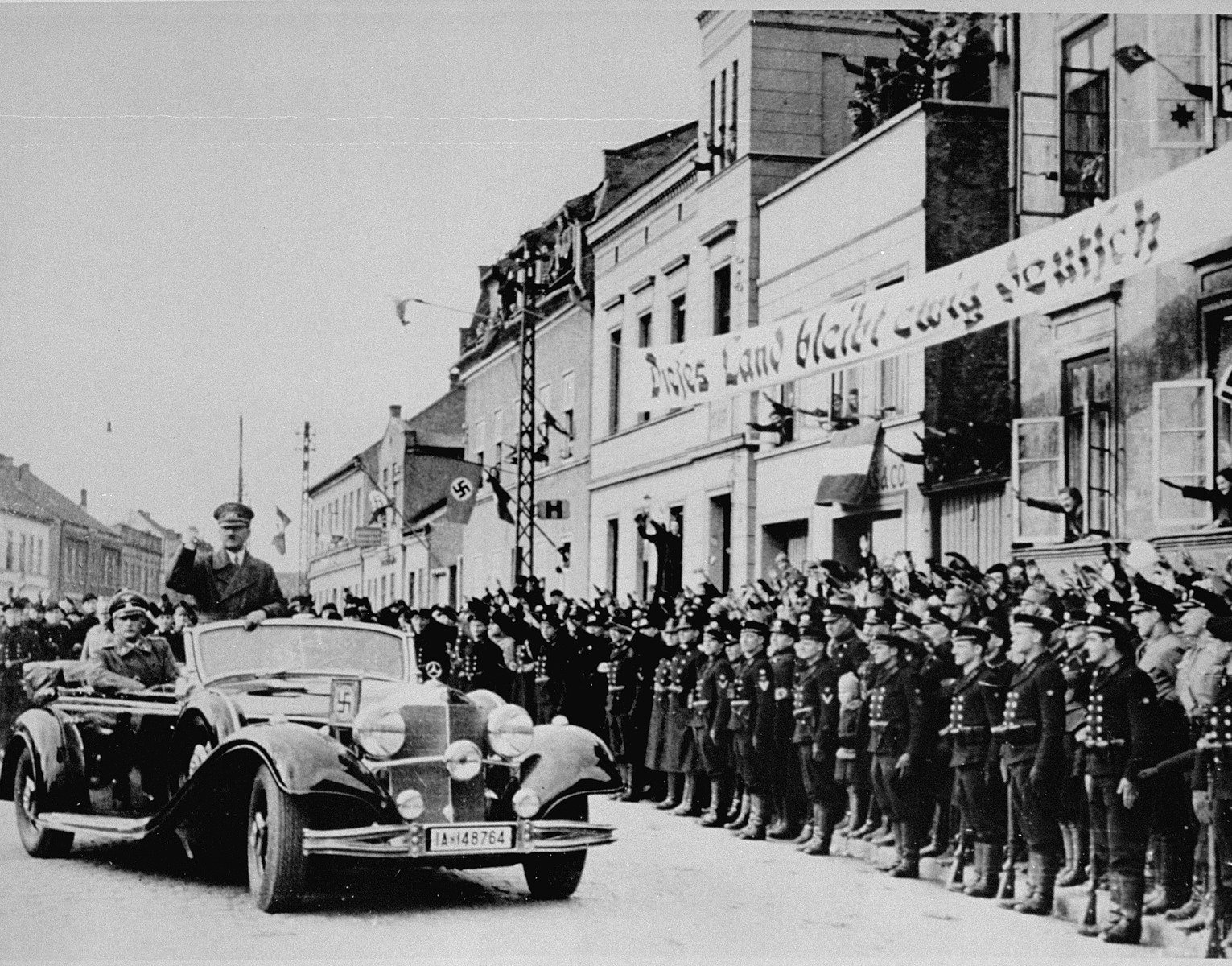
Visit of Adolf Hitler following the German annexation of the city, March 1939

As tensions in pre-war Europe continued to grow, it was expected that Germany would make a move against Lithuania to reacquire the region. German Foreign Minister Joachim von Ribbentrop delivered an ultimatum to the Lithuanian Foreign Minister on 20 March 1939, demanding the surrender of Klaipėda. Lithuania, unable to secure international support for its cause, submitted to the ultimatum and, in exchange for the right to use the new harbour facilities as a free port, ceded the disputed region to Germany in the late evening of 22 March 1939. Adolf Hitler visited the harbour and delivered a speech to the city residents. That was Hitler's last territorial acquisition before World War II.

During the war, the Germans operated a forced labour subcamp of the Stalag I-A prisoner-of-war camp for Allied prisoners of war in the city, and expelled Poles from German-occupied Poland were also enslaved as forced labour in the city's vicinity. The Germans also built several fortifications, including the only naval batteries in Lithuania, the Memel Nord Battery and the Nord Mole Battery.

=== 1945–present ===
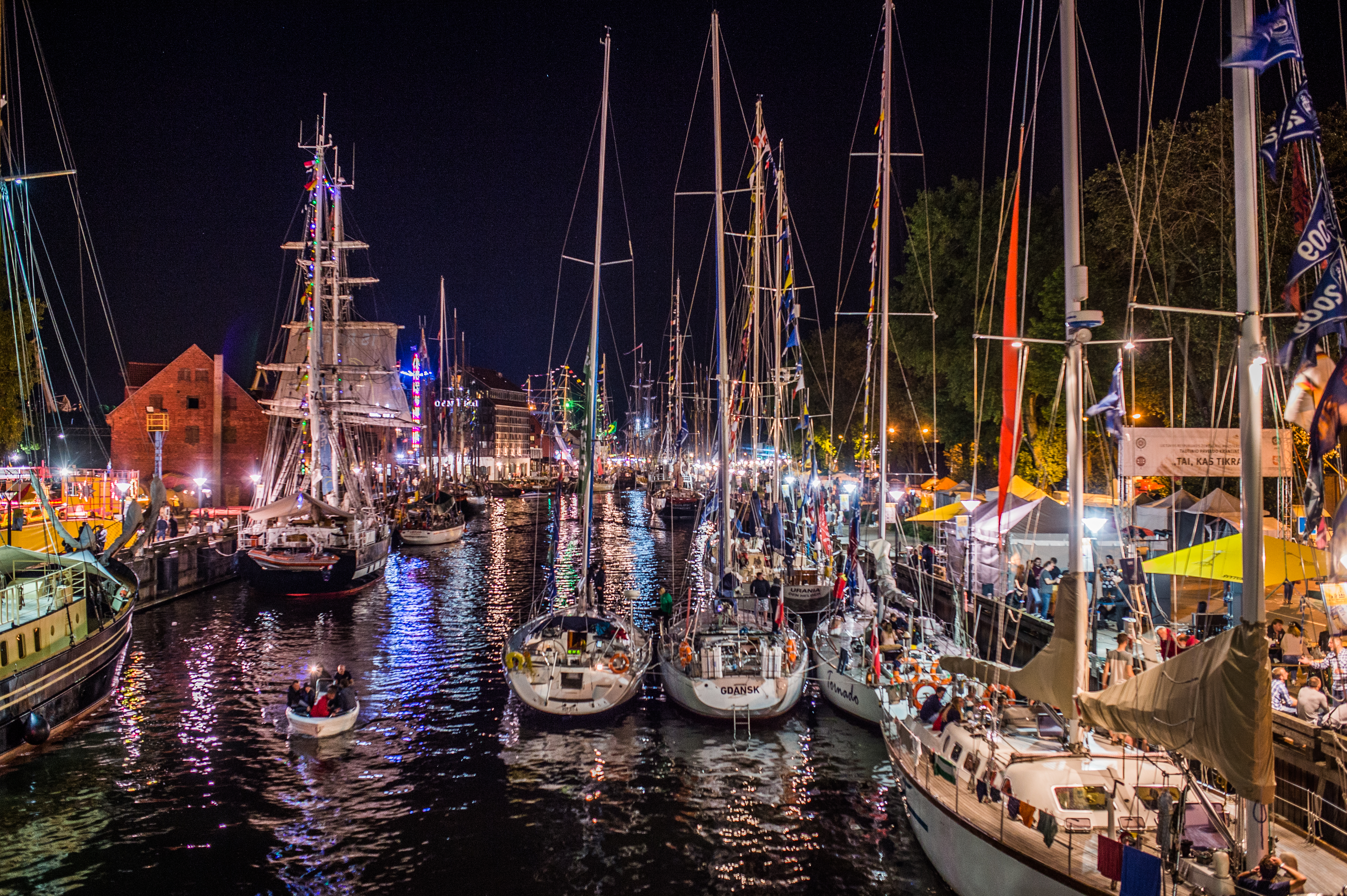
Participants' ships of the 2017 Sea Festival in Klaipėda

During World War II, from the end of 1944 into 1945, the Battle of Memel took place. The nearly-empty city was captured by the Soviet Red Army on 28 January 1945 with only about 50 remaining people. After the war the Klaipėda Region was incorporated into the Lithuanian SSR, and the post-1937 German occupation of various regions of Europe, including Klaipėda, was considered illegal.

The Soviets turned Klaipėda, the foremost ice-free port in the Eastern Baltic, into the largest piscatorial-marine base in the European part of the USSR. Shipyards, dockyards and a fishing port were constructed. Subsequently, by the end of 1959, the population of the city had doubled its pre-war population, and by 1989, there were 202,900 inhabitants. Initially, Russian-speakers dominated the city's local government, but after the death of Joseph Stalin, more people came to the city from the rest of Lithuania than from other Soviet republics and oblasts, and Lithuanians became its major ethnic group. Among Lithuanian cities with a population greater than 100,000, however, Klaipėda has the highest percentage of people whose native language is Russian.

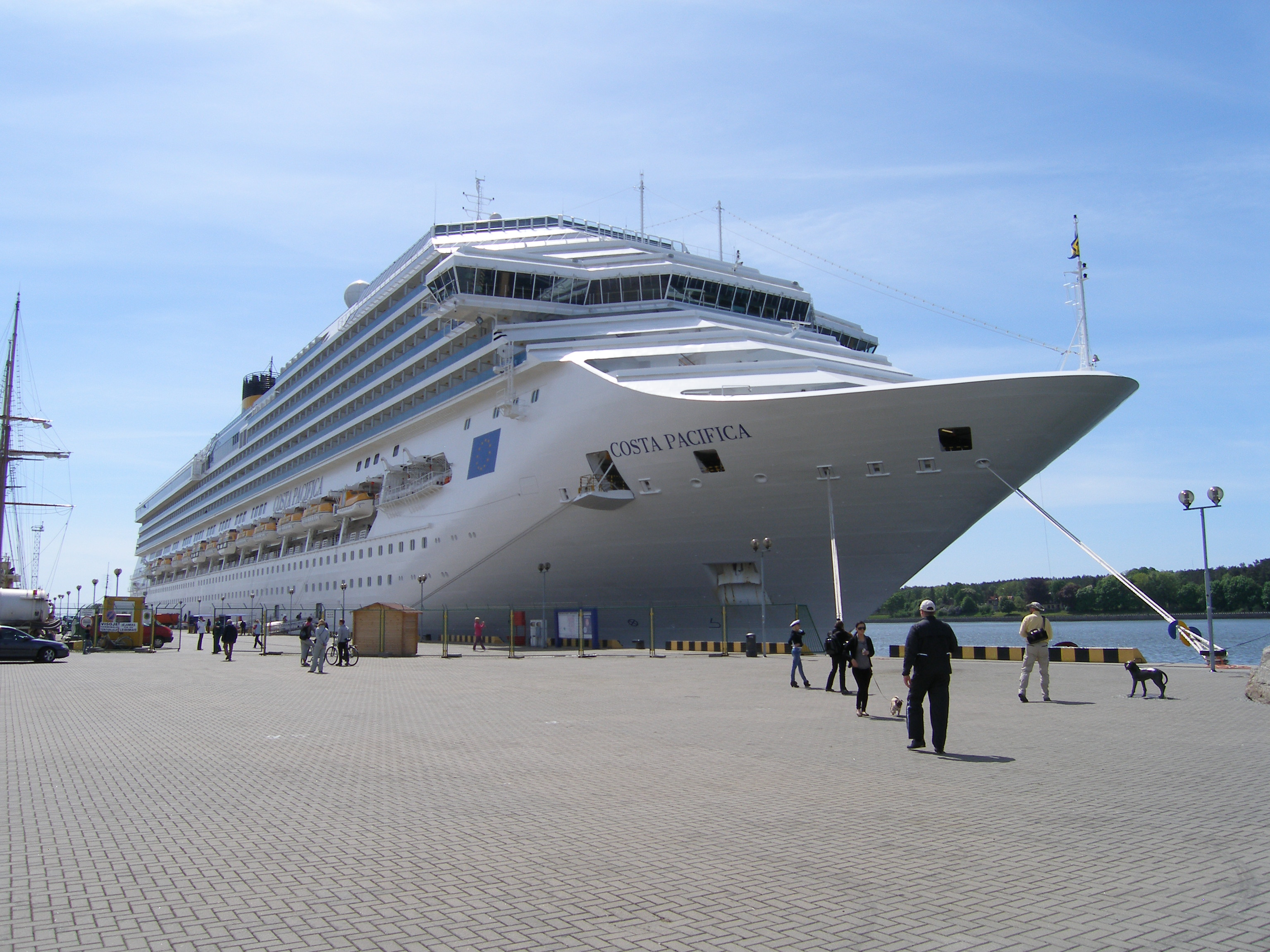
Costa Pacifica in Klaipėda

Until the 1970s, Klaipėda was important to the USSR only for its economy, and cultural and religious activity was minimal and restricted. The developers of a Roman Catholic church (Maria, Queen of Peace, constructed 1957–1962) were arrested. The city began to develop cultural activities in the 1970s and the 1980s, such as the introduction of the Sea Festival cultural tradition, where thousands of people come to celebrate from all over the country. Based on the Pedagogical University of Šiauliai and the National Conservatory of Lithuania in Klaipėda, the University of Klaipėda was established in 1991. Klaipėda is now the home of a bilingual German-Lithuanian institution, the Hermann-Sudermann-Schule, as well as an English-language university, LCC International University.

In 2014, Klaipėda was visited 64 times by cruise ships and surpassed the Latvian capital, Riga, for the first time.

== Geography ==
=== Climate ===
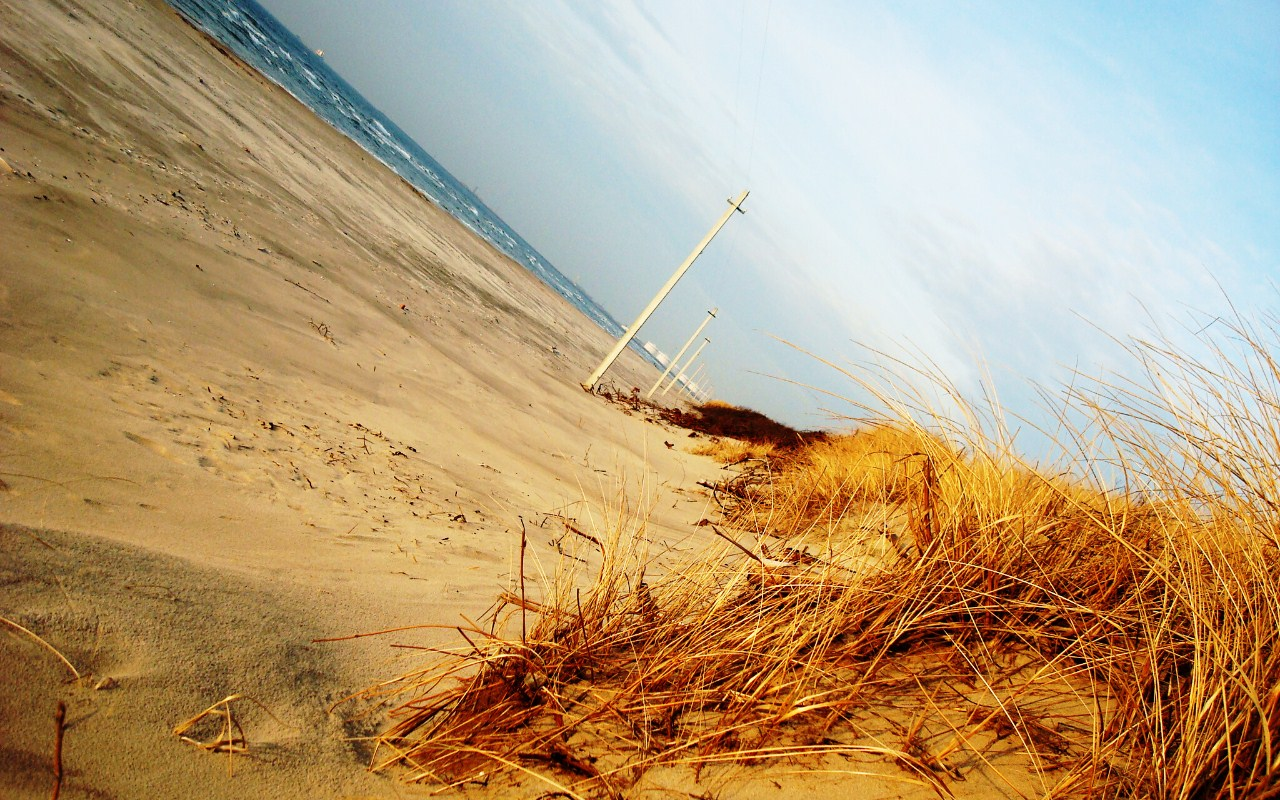
Klaipėda's climate is under the influence of the Baltic Sea.

Klaipėda's climate is considered to be oceanic (Köppen Cfb) using the −3 °C (26.6 °F) isotherm and warm humid continental (Köppen Dfb) using the 0 °C (32.0 °F) isotherm. In July and August, the warmest season, high temperatures average 22 °C (72 °F), and low temperatures average 13 °C (55 °F). The highest official temperature ever recorded was 36.6 °C (97.9 °F) in August 2014. In January and February, the coldest season, high temperatures average 1 °C (34 °F) with low temperatures averaging −5 °C (23 °F). The coldest temperature ever recorded in Klaipėda is −33.4 °C (−28.1 °F) in February 1956. The greatest amount of precipitation occurs in August, with an average precipitation of 85 mm. Meanwhile, the least amount of precipitation occurs in April, with an average of 41 mm.

Climate data for Klaipėda (1991–2020 normals, extremes 1929–present)
Month	Jan	Feb	Mar	Apr	May	Jun	Jul	Aug	Sep	Oct	Nov	Dec	Year
Record high °C (°F)	11.7 (53.1)	15.4 (59.7)	18.6 (65.5)	28.9 (84.0)	31.2 (88.2)	33.8 (92.8)	34.0 (93.2)	36.6 (97.9)	30.4 (86.7)	22.9 (73.2)	15.4 (59.7)	11.5 (52.7)	36.6 (97.9)
Mean maximum °C (°F)	6.1 (43.0)	5.7 (42.3)	10.6 (51.1)	21.0 (69.8)	26.2 (79.2)	27.6 (81.7)	30.0 (86.0)	29.2 (84.6)	23.9 (75.0)	17.5 (63.5)	11.1 (52.0)	7.5 (45.5)	31.3 (88.3)
Mean daily maximum °C (°F)	1.1 (34.0)	1.4 (34.5)	4.7 (40.5)	11.1 (52.0)	16.3 (61.3)	19.6 (67.3)	22.3 (72.1)	22.5 (72.5)	17.9 (64.2)	11.8 (53.2)	6.3 (43.3)	3.0 (37.4)	11.5 (52.7)
Daily mean °C (°F)	−0.9 (30.4)	−0.9 (30.4)	1.7 (35.1)	6.7 (44.1)	11.6 (52.9)	15.3 (59.5)	18.3 (64.9)	18.3 (64.9)	14.2 (57.6)	8.9 (48.0)	4.4 (39.9)	1.1 (34.0)	8.2 (46.8)
Mean daily minimum °C (°F)	−5.0 (23.0)	−4.6 (23.7)	−1.8 (28.8)	2.7 (36.9)	7.0 (44.6)	10.8 (51.4)	13.1 (55.6)	12.7 (54.9)	8.9 (48.0)	4.5 (40.1)	0.9 (33.6)	−2.9 (26.8)	3.9 (39.0)
Mean minimum °C (°F)	−13.5 (7.7)	−12.0 (10.4)	−7.5 (18.5)	−2.6 (27.3)	0.6 (33.1)	5.9 (42.6)	9.4 (48.9)	9.4 (48.9)	3.8 (38.8)	−1.4 (29.5)	−5.1 (22.8)	−9.0 (15.8)	−16.4 (2.5)
Record low °C (°F)	−32.0 (−25.6)	−33.4 (−28.1)	−20.8 (−5.4)	−12.8 (9.0)	−5.2 (22.6)	−2.8 (27.0)	5.2 (41.4)	2.9 (37.2)	−3.3 (26.1)	−7.5 (18.5)	−14.6 (5.7)	−24.1 (−11.4)	−33.4 (−28.1)
Average precipitation mm (inches)	67 (2.6)	45 (1.8)	40 (1.6)	31 (1.2)	39 (1.5)	54 (2.1)	67 (2.6)	86 (3.4)	79 (3.1)	95 (3.7)	82 (3.2)	76 (3.0)	761 (30.0)
Average precipitation days	14.77	11.35	10.05	7.45	7.59	9.22	9.42	11.67	11.55	14.86	14.49	15.39	138.72
Average relative humidity (%)	85	84	79	75	75	78	78	77	79	86	86	86	80
Average dew point °C (°F)	−4 (25)	−4 (25)	−2 (28)	2 (36)	7 (45)	11 (52)	15 (59)	14 (57)	11 (52)	6 (43)	3 (37)	0 (32)	5 (41)
Mean monthly sunshine hours	38.9	68.0	154.0	224.2	296.9	287.9	295.1	268.1	191.9	109.7	39.2	25.2	1,999.4
Source 1: Lithuanian Hydrometeorological Service, Météo Climat (average records high & low, precipitation days)
Source 2: NOAA (extremes), Time and Date (dewpoints, 2005–2015)

Coastal temperature data for Klaipėda
Month	Jan	Feb	Mar	Apr	May	Jun	Jul	Aug	Sep	Oct	Nov	Dec	Year
Average sea temperature °C (°F)	3.2 (37.76)	2.4 (36.32)	1.6 (34.88)	4.2 (39.56)	9.6 (49.28)	15.0 (59.00)	18.6 (65.48)	19.3 (66.74)	17.0 (62.60)	12.6 (54.68)	9.0 (48.20)	5.8 (42.44)	9.9 (49.75)
Source 1: Seatemperature.org

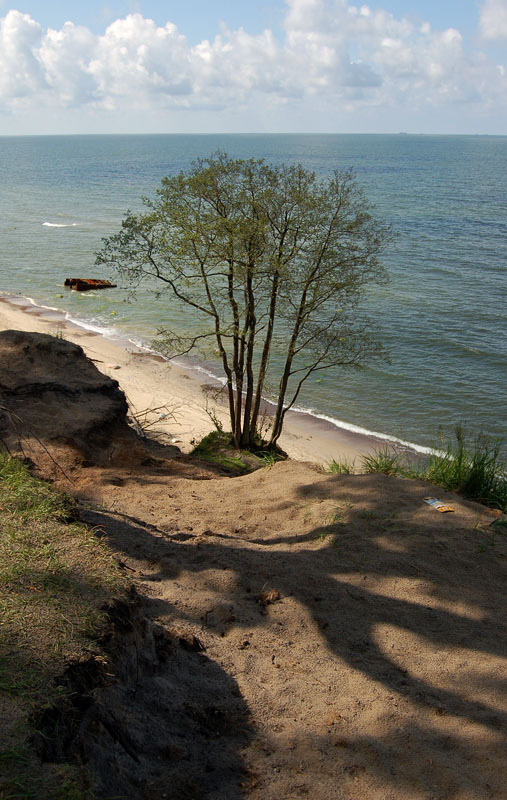
The Dutchman's Cap, a 24 m (79 ft) bluff at a regional seaside park

=== Parks and forests ===
Parks:

- Martynas Mazvydas Sculpture Park
- Klaipėda University Botanical Garden
- Klaipėda Recreation Park
- Danė Pocket-Park
- Fisherman Statue Pocket-Park
- "Treko" Park
- Park by Reikjaviko and Smiltelės Streets
- Draugystė Park (Friendship Park)
- Oak Grove Park
- Debreceno Street Pocket-Park
- Thick Linden-Tree Pocket-Park
- Priestotės Street Pocket-Park
- Trinyčiai Park
- Sąjūdis Park
- Jono kalnelis (Hill of John) park

Forests:

- Klaipėda Forest
- Giruliai Forest
- Smiltynė Forest

== Demographics ==
Historical population
Year	Pop.	±%
1722	3,400	—
1782	5,500	+61.8%
1790	6,300	+14.5%
1813	7,230	+14.8%
1823	5,300	−26.7%
1837	9,000	+69.8%
1855	17,000	+88.9%
1861	17,500	+2.9%
1875	20,000	+14.3%
1890	19,282	−3.6%
1897	20,100	+4.2%
1905	20,700	+3.0%
1912	23,500	+13.5%
1925	35,845	+52.5%
1931	37,142	+3.6%
1938	47,189	+27.1%
1950	48,500	+2.8%
1959	89,500	+84.5%
1961	106,243	+18.7%
1967	131,600	+23.9%
1970	140,342	+6.6%
1978	175,200	+24.8%
1979	176,648	+0.8%
1985	195,000	+10.4%
1989	202,929	+4.1%
1991	208,300	+2.6%
1992	207,100	−0.6%
1999	203,300	−1.8%
2001	192,954	−5.1%
2007	185,936	−3.6%
2008	184,657	−0.7%
2009	183,433	−0.7%
2010	182,752	−0.4%
2011	162,360	−11.2%
2014	157,305	−3.1%
2017	162,835	+3.5%
2018	149,015	−8.5%
2019	148,506	−0.3%
2020	152,177	+2.5%
2021	152,008	−0.1%
2022	152,237	+0.2%
2023	156,745	+3.0%
2024	159,279	+1.6%
2025	160,979	+1.1%

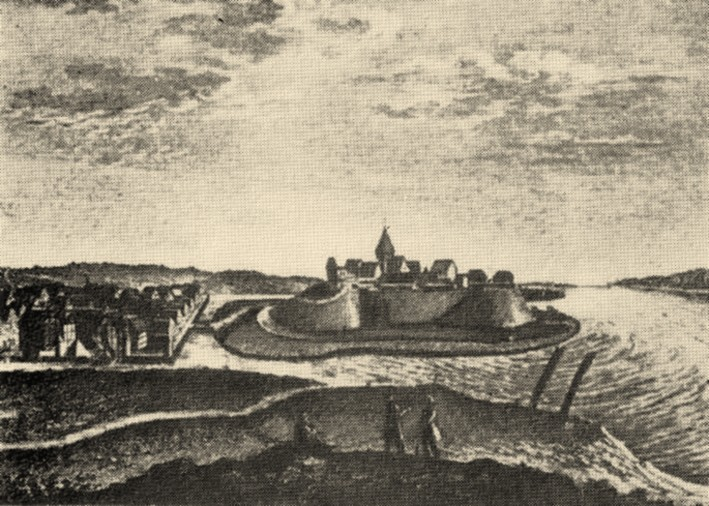
Residents houses (left) and Klaipėda Castle (right) in c. 1535

Klaipėda was established as an outpost dedicated for German crusaders. Initially, Klaipėda developed slowly. In the 13th century, it was often attacked by the Sambians and Samogitians, and in the middle of the 15th century, it was attacked by the Gdańskians (for trading reasons). Consequently, in the 13th–15th centuries, Klaipėda was burned or ruined around 20 times.

In the second half of the 15th century, the residents began to settle in a territory of the Klaipėda Old Town, which was on a peninsula of the right bank of the old Danė. Soon, the reconstruction of the Klaipėda Castle began, and all residents moved to the peninsula.

The development of Klaipėda was fueled by the increasing trade of the Grand Duchy of Lithuania with the Western countries. Around 1503, there were 25 families of full-fledged townspeople, while in 1540, there were 107 families. Eventually, in 1589, there were 143 families in Klaipėda. The Lithuanians and Curonians lived alongside the German colonists, but the magistrate did not allow non-Germans to join artisan corporations and did not grant them rights available to townspeople. In the State of the Teutonic Order, Old Prussians and Western Lithuanians were not allowed to engage in trade, crafts, and settle in cities. Thus, in the Duchy of Prussia, most of the cities' residents were Germans. Nevertheless, villages in Lithuania Minor were extensively inhabited by Lithuanians, and Klaipėda developed as one of the most important centres of Lithuania Minor. According to the Prussian Law, all native citizens were initially called as Prussians, while only in the 16th century did classification of the population by nationality begin. In 1525–1818, Klaipėda was part of the Lithuanian Province (the term was used in state legal documents and Prussian monarchs decrees), which comprised the most Lithuanian territories of Lithuania Minor (the Klaipėda, Tilsit, Ragainė, Įsrūtis counties).

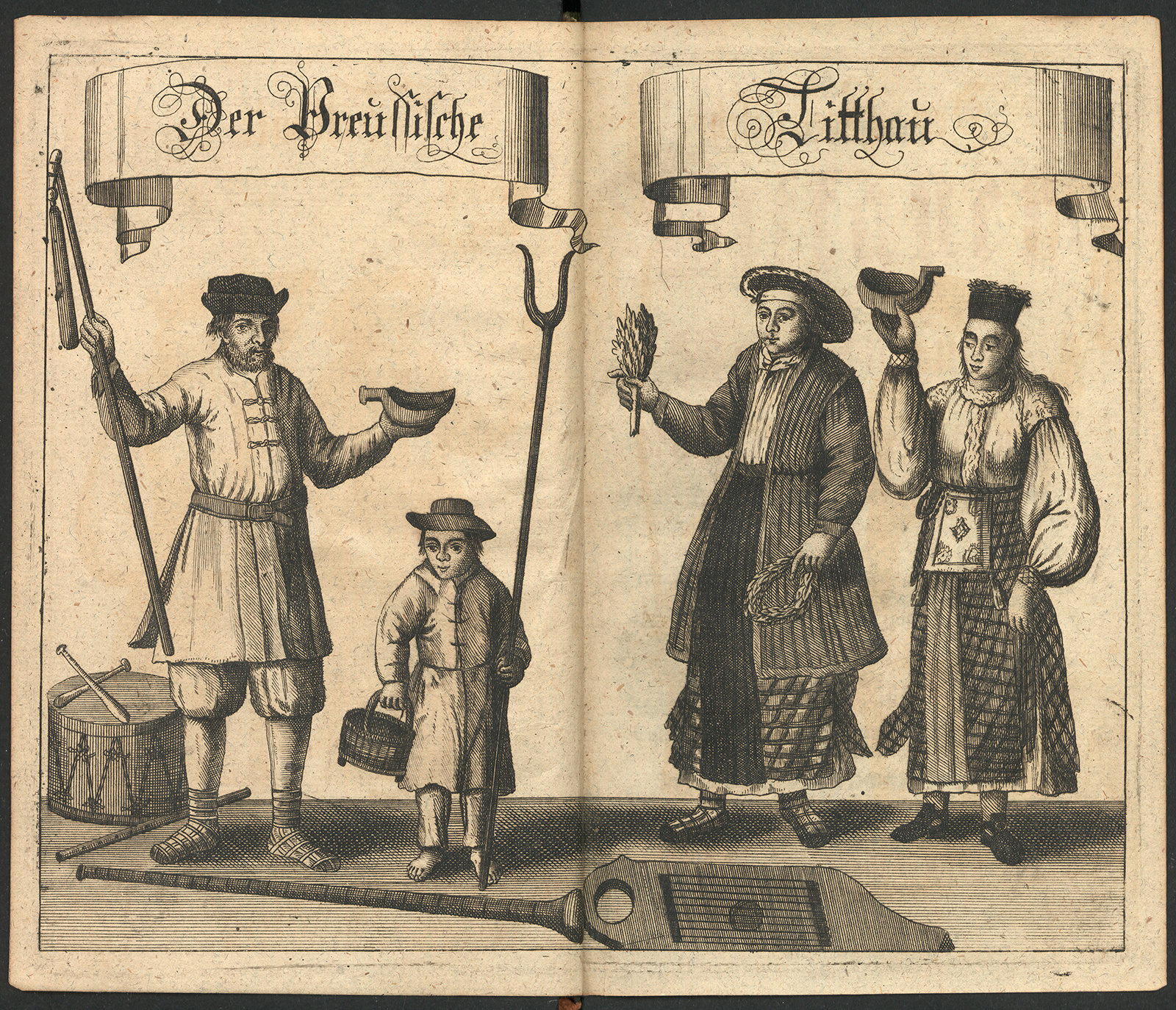
Prussian Lithuanians in 1744

There were few German colonists in Royal Prussia when Prussian monarchs were vassals of the Polish kings (1466–1660), and they mostly moved to cities and towns. During the Second Northern War in 1656–1657, Lithuania Minor was damaged by Tatars detached from the Army of the Polish–Lithuanian Commonwealth. Following the Treaty of Oliva in 1660, Klaipėda become part of the Brandenburg-Prussia constituent state, which led to strengthened oppression of the locals of Lithuania Minor.

In 1701 the Kingdom of Prussia was created and Prussian officials and intellectuals propagated a political direction which claimed that a new nation formed from Prussian Lithuanians (Lietuvininkai), Old Prussians, and German colonists. In the beginning of the 18th century 300,000 residents lived in the core of Lithuania Minor and up to 100% of peasant farms in the Klaipėda Region were Lithuanian, however cities in Lithuania Minor become centres of Germanisation, cultural assimilation, and colonization. In 1700–1721 the Prussian Lithuanians population was dramatically decreased in Klaipėda and other Lithuanian counties by the Great Northern War plague outbreak which killed 160,000 (53%) of residents in Lithuania Minor (more than 90% of the deceased were Prussian Lithuanians). Following it, the Prussian authorities organized a large-scale German colonization of Lithuania Minor. The colonists received various privileges, however they constituted for only 13.4% of residents and quite a few of them later departed to other countries. In 1736–1818 Klaipėda was part of Lithuanian Department which had over 340,000 residents. The recovering population was ravaged by the Imperial Russian Army during the Seven Years' War in 1756–1763. In 1782 Klaipėda had 5500 residents, in 1790 – 6300.

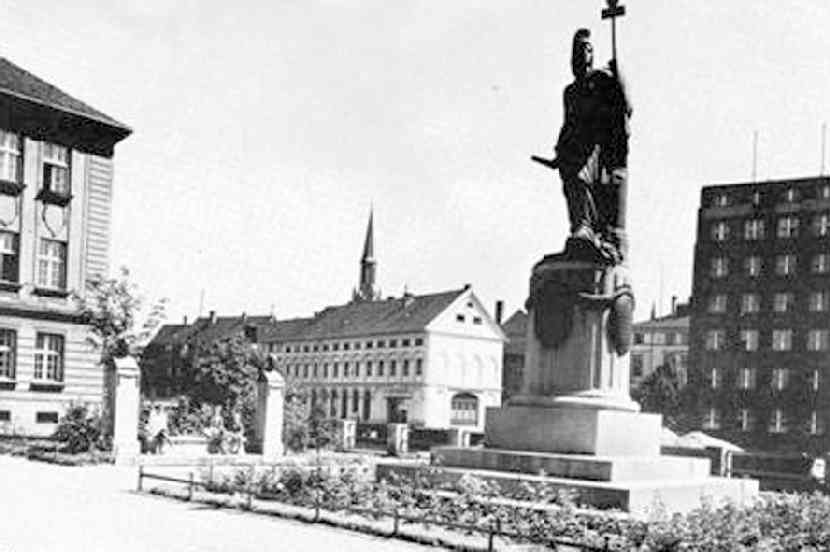
Borussia (Prussia in Latin) Monument in Klaipėda circa 1920

In the General State Laws for the Prussian States (completed in 1794) the serfdom and privileged position of landlords and colonists was consolidated. During the Napoleonic Wars Napoleon I occupied most of the Kingdom of Prussia, thus in 1807–1808 Klaipėda was a residence of Prussian monarchs and in 1807 Frederick William III abolished serfdom. Following the abolishment of serfdom Prussian Lithuanians migrated to Klaipėda, especially its outskirts, and in 1837 they constituted 10.1% of the residents. In 1825 Klaipėda had 8,500 residents. Moreover, after the Uprising of 1863–1864 part of the Lithuanian insurgents retreated to Lithuania Minor. In 1855 Vitė was added to the city of Klaipėda, thus the number of population increased to over 17,000 and in 1875 reached ~20,000. Before World War I, the majority of Lithuanians in Königsberg Region (which included Klaipėda) integrated into the German nation. In March 1915 the population of Klaipėda was yet again ravaged by the Imperial Russian Army.

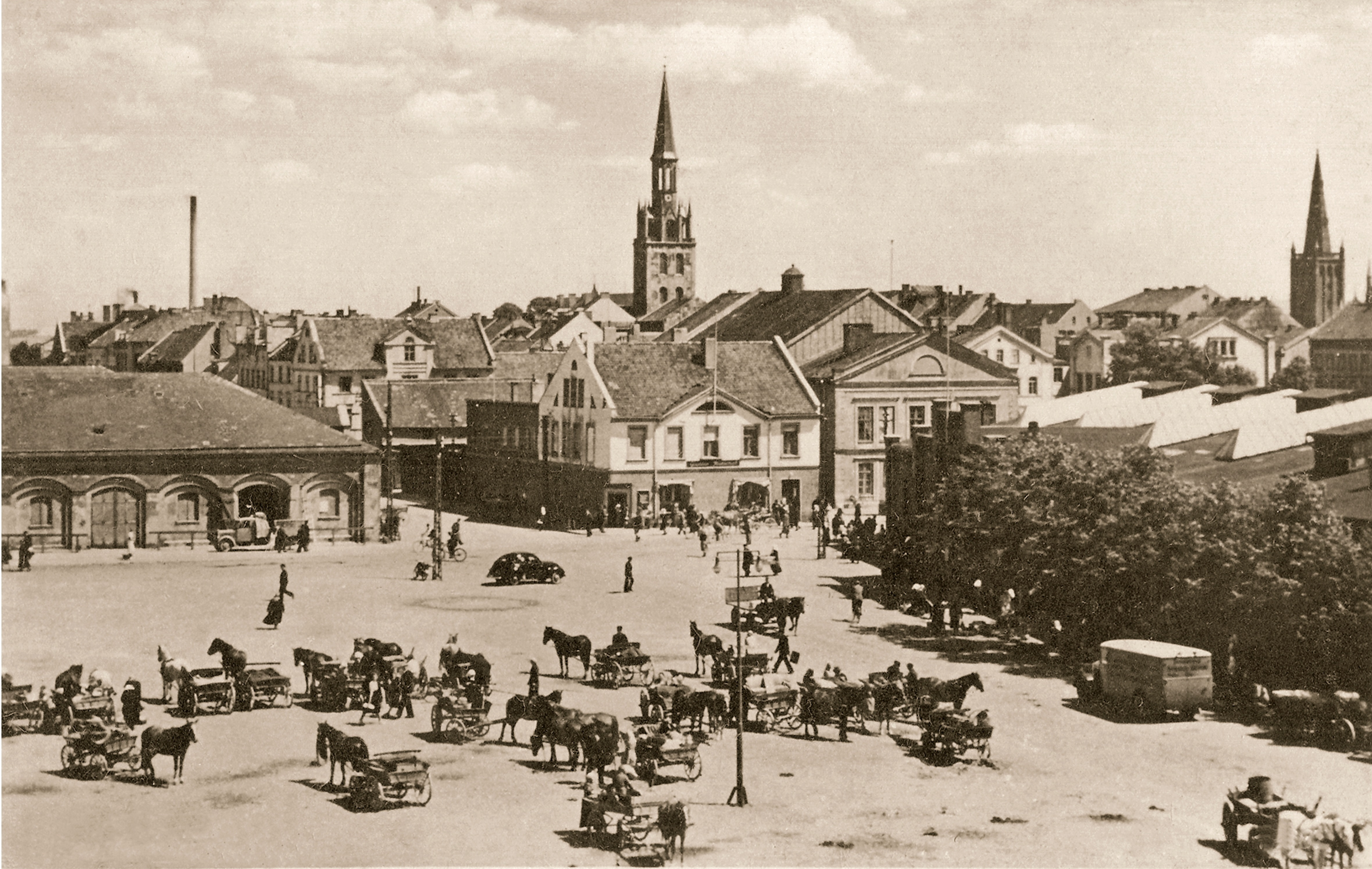
Theatre Square before 1930

Following the Klaipėda Revolt in 1923, Klaipėda Region was incorporated into Lithuania and Lithuanian population in Klaipėda increased due to migration (Lithuanians constituted 30.3% and Germans 57.3% of Klaipėda's 35,845 population in 1925). German politicians promoted a Memellander ideology and argued that Germans and local Lithuanians were "two ethnicities (Volkstümer), yet one cultural community (Kulturgemeinschaft)". Lithuania ceded Klaipėda Region to Nazi Germany due to the 1939 German ultimatum to Lithuania, however soon World War II started and residents of Klaipėda were evacuated to Germany. In the aftermath of World War II almost all the new residents moved to Klaipėda from Lithuania, Russia, Belarus and Ukraine, replacing the former German-speaking population (after the war only six old residents remained in the city). Over the years the Lithuanian population in the city continued to grow and constituted: 55.2% in 1959, 60.9% in 1970, 61.5% in 1979, 63.0% in 1989, 71.3% in 2001, 73.9% in 2011.

As of 2025, the population of Klaipėda was 160,979. The latest data shows that there are more women in the city: females make up 52.83% (85,053), males make up 47.17% (75,926). In 2022, Lithuanians constituted 80% of the population in Klaipėda.

== Religion ==
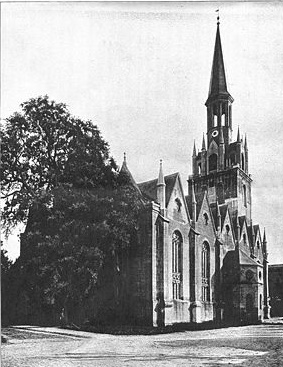
Façade of the Church of St. John with 75-metre tower which dominated in Klaipėda's skyline until World War II, photographed in the 19th century

The first church (possibly chapel) dedicated to the military garrison was built along with the Klaipėda Castle in 1252 and was consecrated after Mary, mother of Jesus, although it did not have as much effect for the townspeople, as well as the residents of surrounding villages. Initially, it was planned that Klaipėda would become centre of the Bishopric of Courland. Thus, before 1290, a St. Mary's Cathedral was built in the town and a six-members chapter settled down in 1290. Nevertheless, the cathedral also did not have much effect on the town's religious life in long-term as bishop Edmund von Werth waived his rights to the cathedral in 1298. Eventually, the cathedral was moved to Windau.

Eberhard von Sayn, the Teutonic Grand Marshal, and Heinrich von Lützelburg, the Bishop of Courland, agreed in a treaty to build two churches: one for German colonists (Church of St. John), the other for baptized natives (Church of St. Nicholas). The Church of St. Nicholas was large (with 10 windows) and served residents of many neighborhoods. The church services were held in Latin and sermons were given in German, but there also were translators into the language of the local people who had a dedicated place near the pulpit.

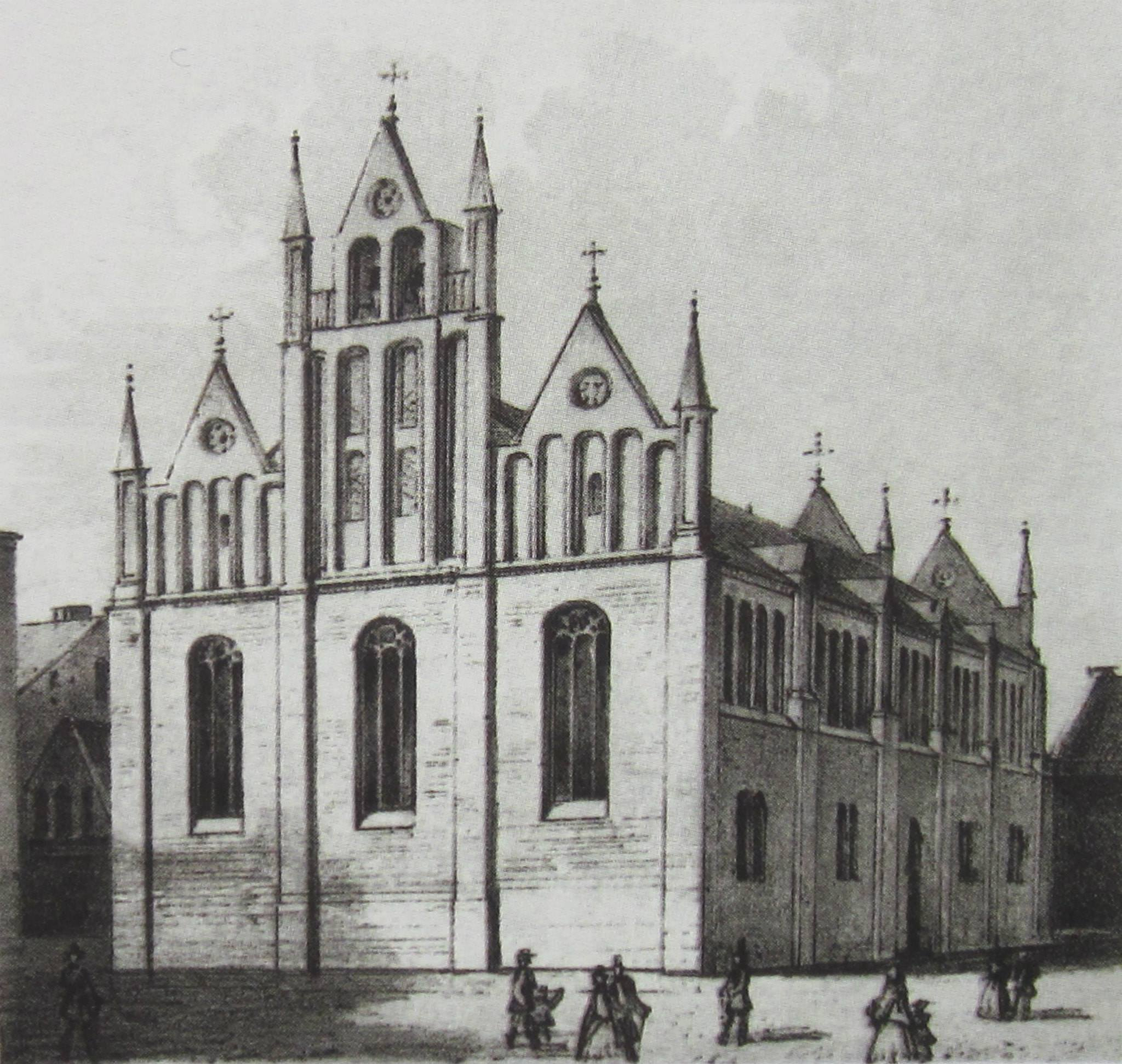
Church of St. Jacob (Lietuvininkai) in the second half of the 19th century

Following the creation of the Duchy of Prussia in 1525 and due to the Reformation movement, the Evangelical faith was spread in the languages of the local people, including Lithuanian. In 1620, the Lithuanian Parish of Klaipėda became an independent unit, but in 1627, the Church of St. Nicholas was demolished due to necessity to build a city wall around a growing city and the parish was left without its own church. The construction of a new church for the Lithuanian Parish began in 1686, and the new church was consecrated in the summer of 1687. Johann Lehmann worked in the new church, and by having a great knowledge of Lithuanian language he checked the Daniel Klein's Grammatica Litvanica and wrote other texts in Lithuanian. Following Lehmann's death, the parish was taken over by his son, who worked there for 32 years, and then his grandson, who worked there in 1696–1722. Later priests of the parish (e.g. Abraham David Lüneburg, Johann Richter) also knew Lithuanian language and published Lithuanian texts.

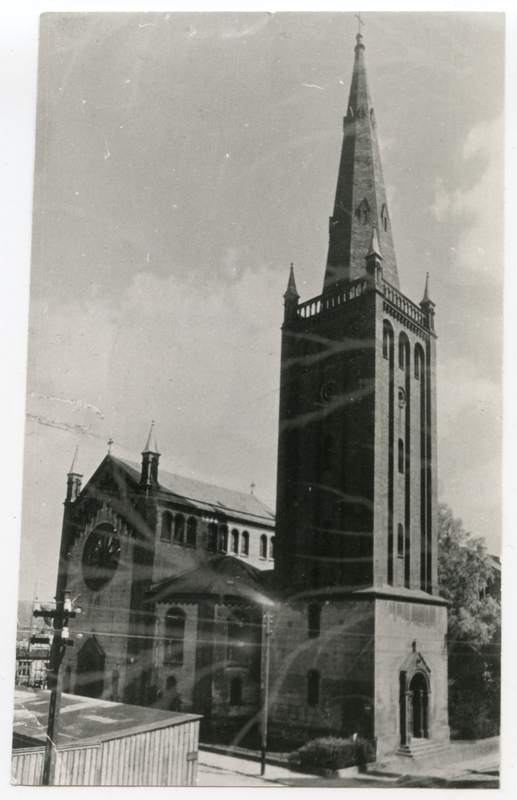
Evangelical Reformed Church in the 1930s

The Lithuanian Church was destroyed during the Great Fire of Klaipėda in 1854. Consequently, the parishioners collected funds and the reconstruction project was prepared by architect Friedrich August Stüler which was completed in the winter of 1856. The Lithuanian Parish of Klaipėda was large (it had 15,600 parishioners in 1848 and 16,000 parishioners in 1878). In 1852, German services started being held in the Lithuanian Church, and since then, the church was called Landkirche, but was eventually renamed to Church of St. Jacob. Karl Rudolf Jacobi worked in the Church of St. Jacob in 1859–1881 and in 1879 was selected as Chairman of the Lithuanian Literary Society. After Jacobi's death he was replaced by Janis Pipirs who is also known for his prominent Lithuanian publications. Following the Klaipėda Revolt in 1923 the priests of the Church of St. Jacob stayed loyal to Lithuania and did not demonstrate vast support for Adolf Hitler in 1939. Due to migration following the revolt, the number of Catholics in Klaipėda increased and in 1926 the deanery of Klaipėda was assigned to the Roman Catholic Diocese of Telšiai. In 1939 the Catholic deanery had 25,000 believers. In 1944 almost the entire Lutheran parish was evacuated westward to avoid Soviet repressions. Due to the forceful implementation of state atheism in the post-war period, the damaged churches of St. John, St. Jacob, Evangelical Reformed, Anglican and Catholic Church of the Holy Trinity were completely demolished.

In 1956, there were 30,000 Catholics in Klaipėda. Following the death of Joseph Stalin, a construction of the Church of Mary, Queen of Peace, in Rumpiškės Street was started in 1961, but the Soviet administration did not allow to open it. Furthermore, with the support of the Soviet Army, the tower of the church was demolished and it was rearranged into a philharmonic, while priests who built the church were imprisoned. The church was eventually returned to the believers in 1987.

Following the restoration of independent Lithuania in 1990, Klaipėda has one of the largest parishes of the Lithuanian Evangelical Lutheran Church. Since 1991, the Catholic Church of Klaipėda Region belongs to the Roman Catholic Diocese of Telšiai. The Days of Lutheran Culture that features various concerts, discussions, lectures and other events are held annually in Klaipėda Region since 2023.

== City municipality ==
The Klaipėda city municipality council is the governing body of the Klaipėda city municipality. It is responsible for municipal laws. The council is composed of 31 members (30 councillors and a mayor) and is directly elected for four-year terms.

The council is the member of the Association of Local Authorities in Lithuania.

=== Mayors ===
- 1990–1992 – Povilas Vasiliauskas
- 1992–1994 – Benediktas Petrauskas
- 1994–1995 – Jurgis Aušra
- 1995–1997 – Silverijus Šukys
- 1997–2000 and 2000–2001 – Eugenijus Gentvilas
- 2001–2003, 2003–2007, 2007–2011 – Rimantas Taraškevičius
- 2011–2015, 2015–2019, 2019–2023 – Vytautas Grubliauskas
- 2023–present – Arvydas Vaitkus

== Port of Klaipėda ==
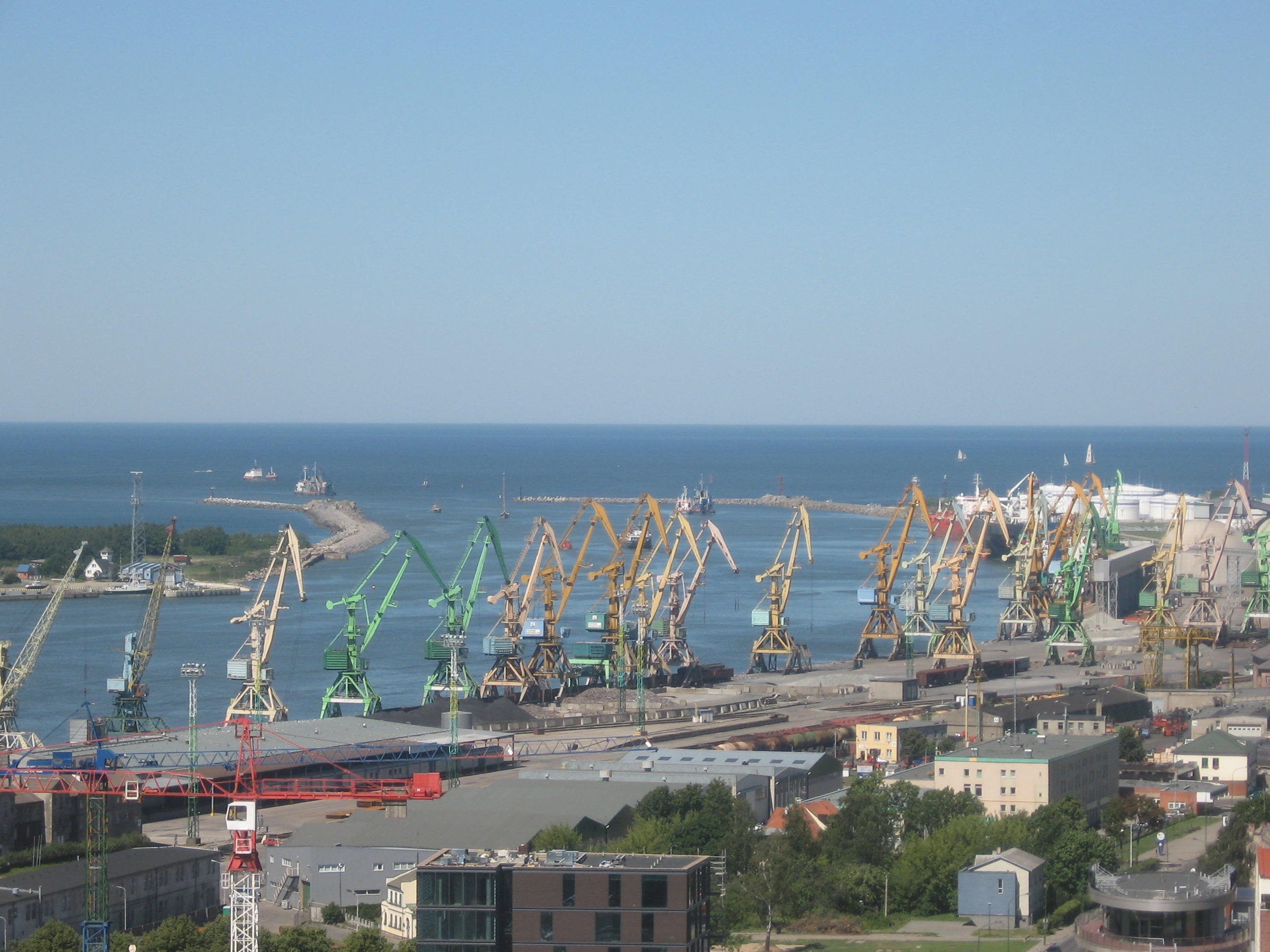
The port of Klaipėda handled more than 36 million tons of cargo in 2022

The Port of Klaipėda is the principal ice-free port on the eastern coast of the Baltic Sea. It is an important transportation hub in Lithuania, which connects sea, land and railway routes from East to West. Klaipėda is a multipurpose, universal, deep-water port. Nineteen stevedoring companies, as well as ship-repair and shipbuilding yards, operate within the port, where marine business and cargo handling services are rendered.

The annual port cargo handling capacity is up to 60 million tons. In 2022 the port handled 36,1 million tons of cargo and it was visited by 5605 ships. The port operates 24 hours a day, seven days a week, all year round.

== Culture and contemporary life ==
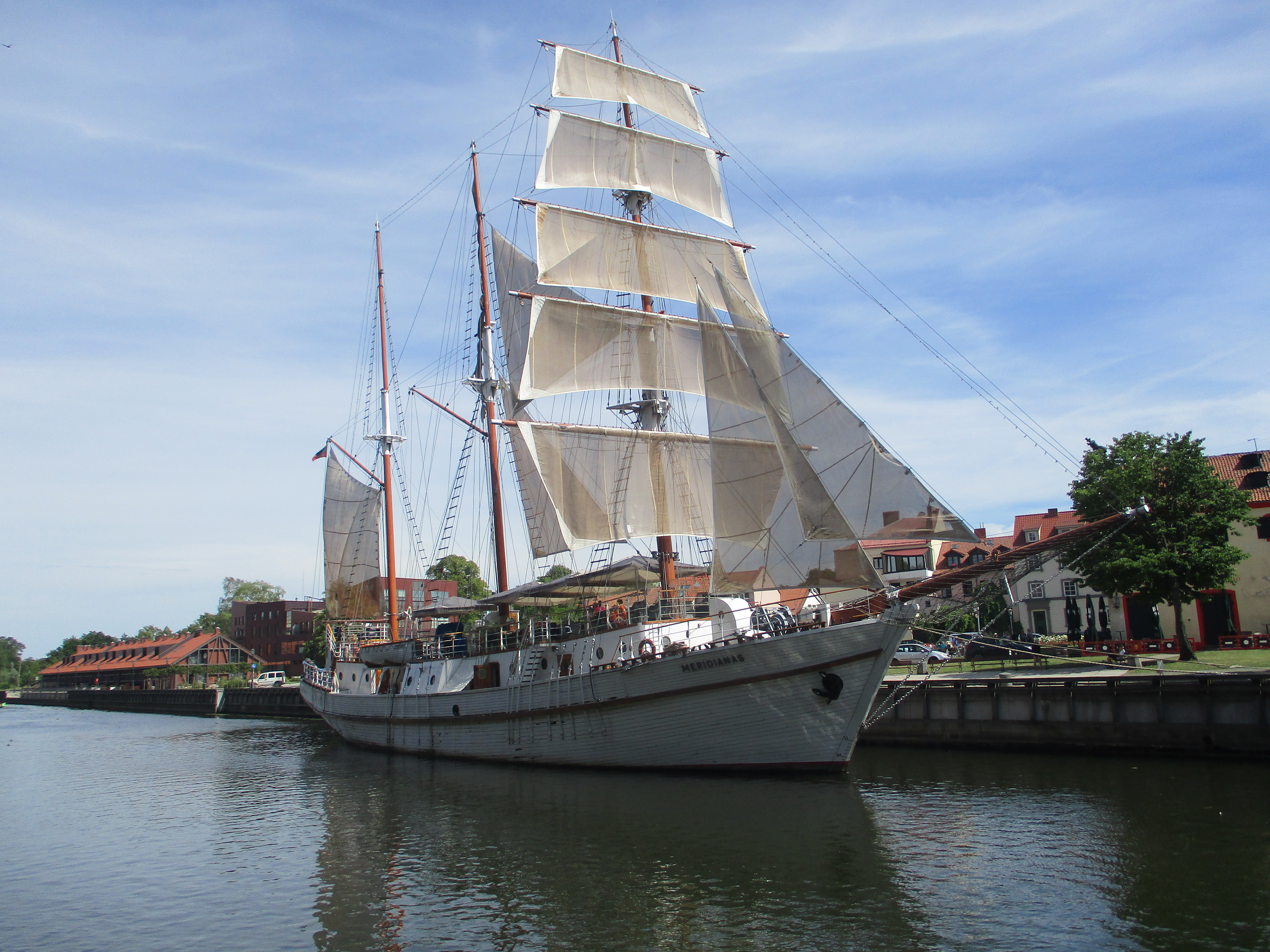
One of Klaipėda's most recognizable symbols – The Meridianas

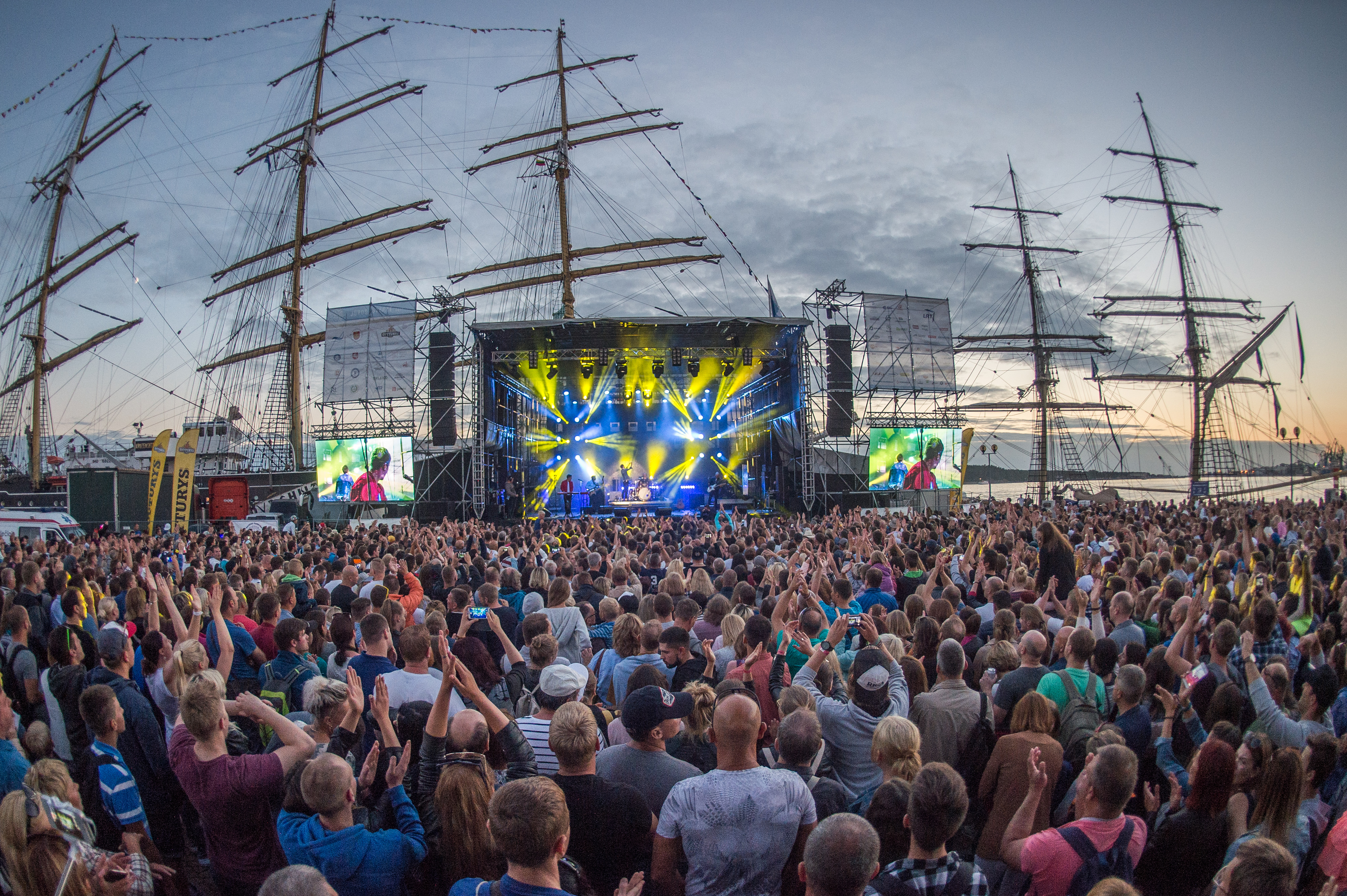
Klaipėda Sea Festival concert

=== Historical ===
Klaipėda's main attractions are the historic buildings in the city's centre, dating from the 13th to 18th centuries. Some of its older buildings have half-timbered construction, similar to that found in Germany, France, England, Denmark and southern Sweden. Other places of interest include:

- The remnants of the Klaipėda Castle, built in the 13th century by the Teutonic Order. It had and a quadrangular tower, surrounded by the ramparts and brick bastions. It lost importance after the Russian occupation from 1756 to 1762, and thenceforth started to decay.
- The Žardė ancient settlement, situated on the right bank of the river Smiltelė. It is dated to the late Iron Age (10th century), and was inhabited until the 16th century.
- The remnants of the so-called "Dutch" defence system around the entire town from the 17th–18th centuries.
- The maritime museum in Fort Wilhelm, built at the end of the 19th century at the spike of the Curonian Spit.

=== Cinemas ===
- Arlekinas
- Forum cinemas

=== Theatres ===
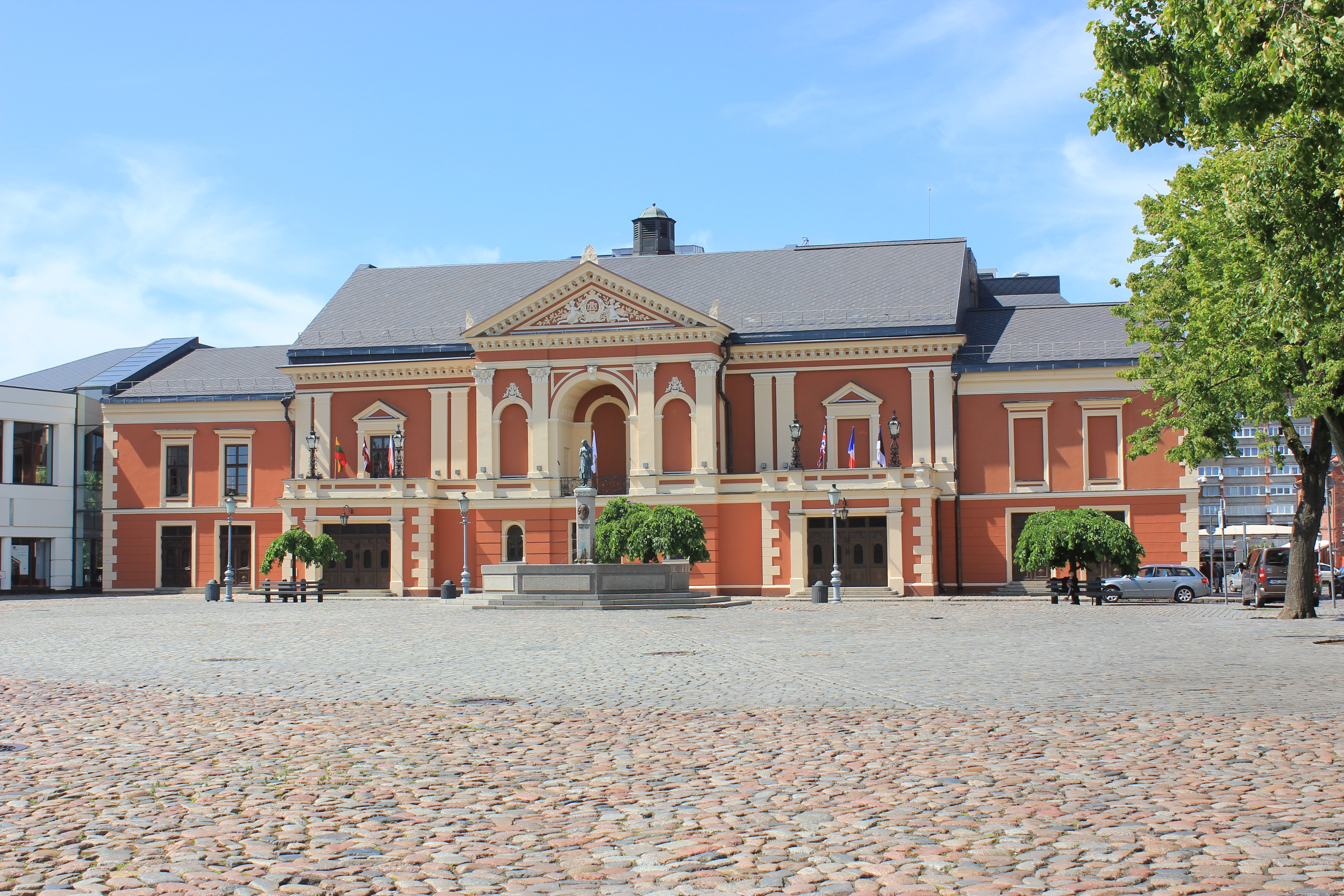
Klaipėda Drama Theatre

- Klaipėda Musical theatre
- Klaipėda Drama theatre
- Klaipėda Puppet theatre
- Apeironas theater
- Dance theater "Šokio teatras"
- Klaipėda youth theater "Klaipėdos jaunimo teatras"

=== Museums ===
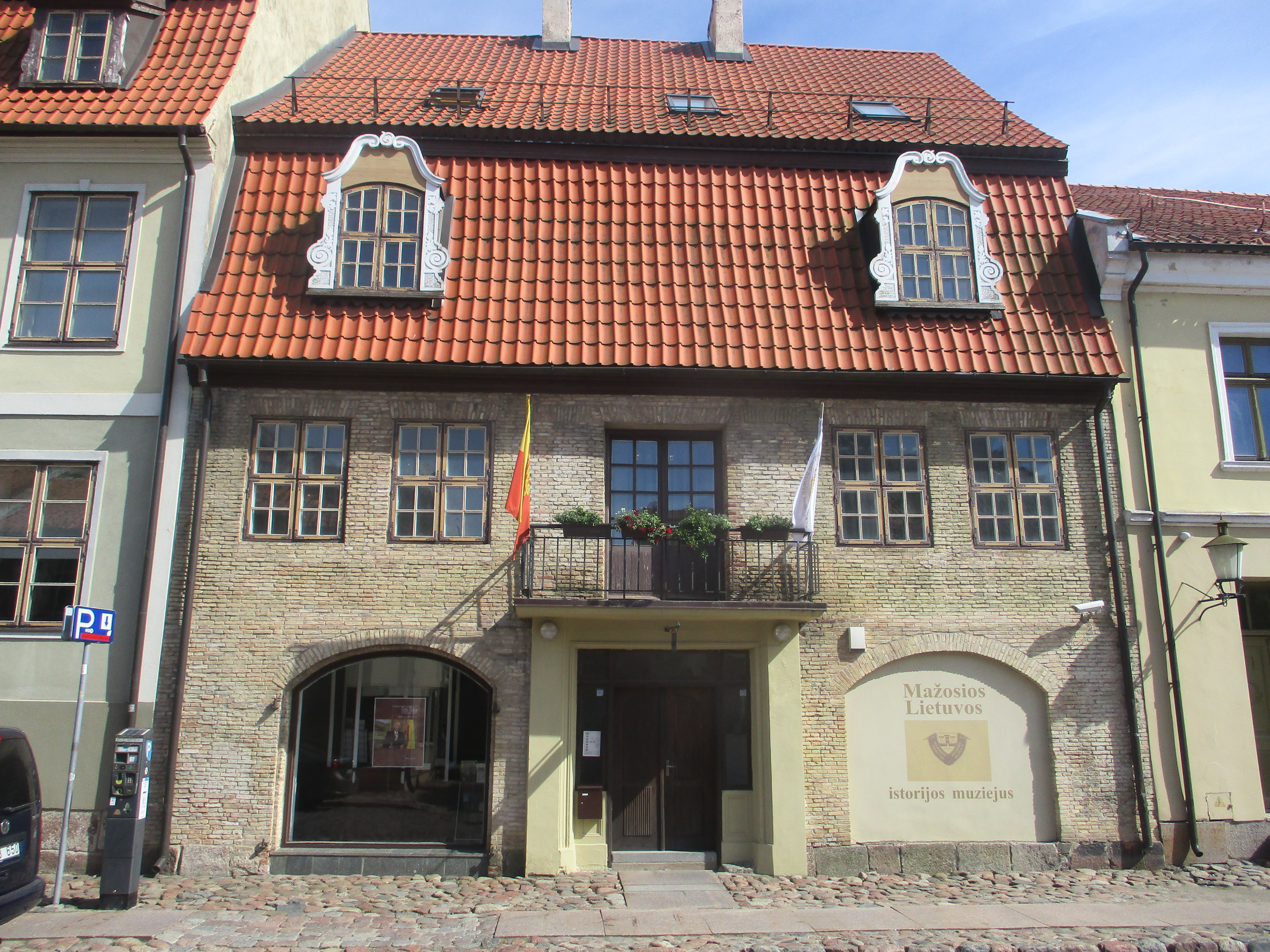
History Museum of Lithuania Minor

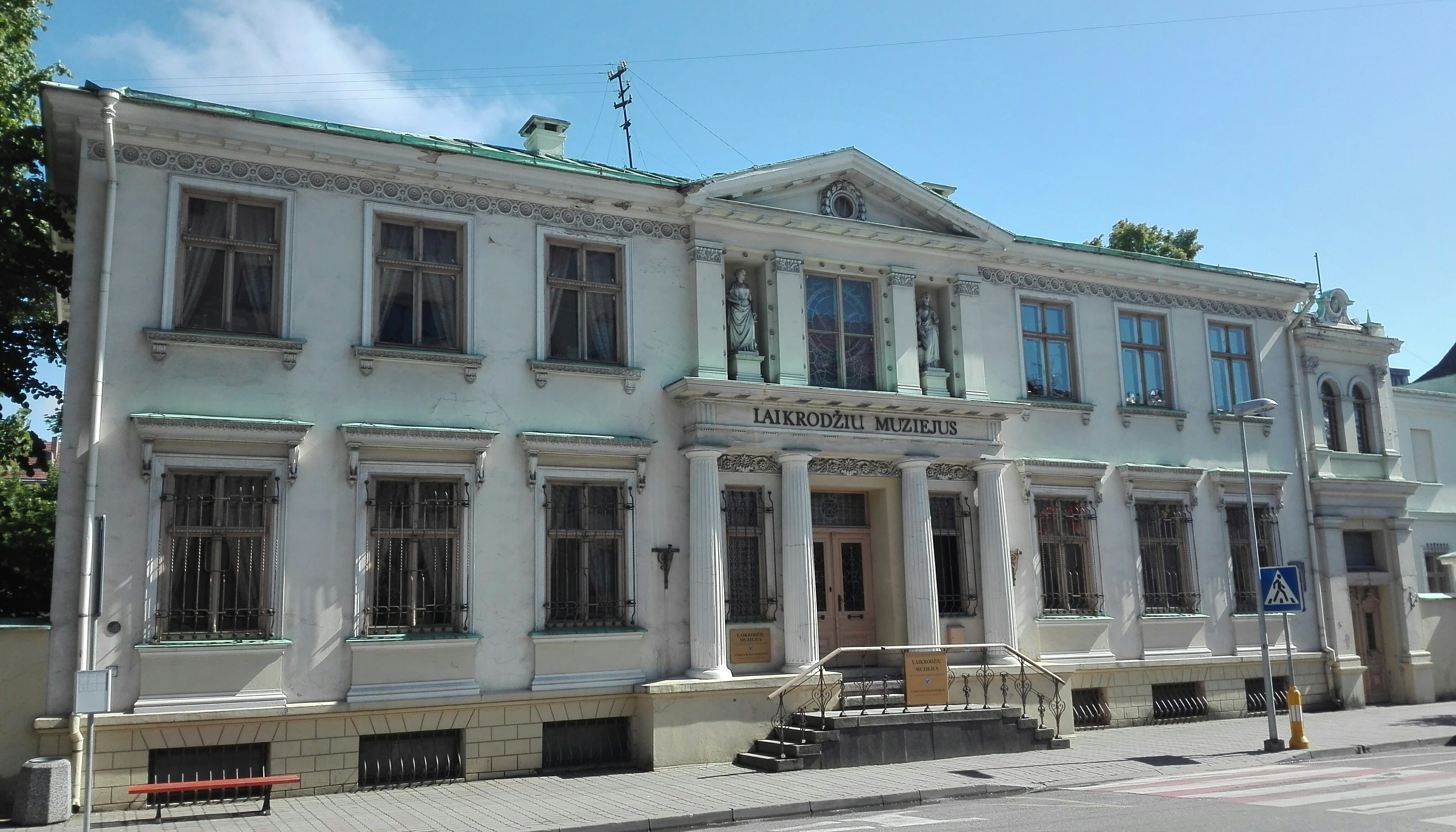
Clocks Museum

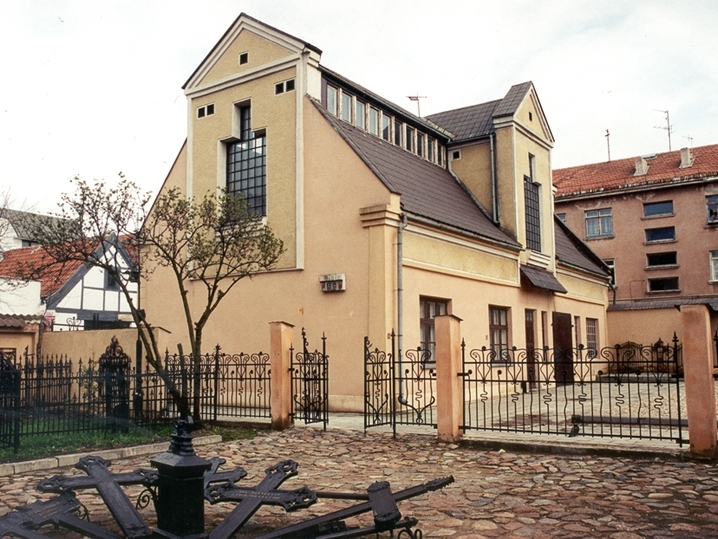
Blacksmiths Museum

Lithuanian Maritime Museum

- "39–45"
- "Amber Queen" museum of amber
- Blacksmiths museum
- Castle museum
- Clocks museum
- Exposition of resistance movement and deportation
- Lithuanian Art Museum Pranas Domšaitis gallery
- The History Museum of Lithuania Minor
- Maritime museum and Dolphinarium

=== Maritime Museum ===
The Lithuanian Maritime Museum is set in a former nineteenth-century fortification of the Spit. In the Maritime Museum, there is an aquarium, which features exhibitions of marine fauna, mammals and seabirds. The aquarium is populated with invertebrates, and freshwater fish of Lithuania, as well as various tropical fish. The museum's courtyard has a pool filled with seals, sea lions, and penguins. The marine fauna exhibition has diverse exhibits: mollusk shells, various fossils, algae and other special exhibits, including prehistoric organisms.

=== Festivals ===
Annual events include Klaipėda Music Spring, the Klaipėda Castle Jazz Festival, Museum Nights, the International Festival of Street Theatres, the International Short Film Festival, and the Klaipėda Sea Festival, among others. The Parbėg laivelis folk festival, which involves concerts, ship displays and theatrical performances, is also regularly held.

== Cityscape ==
=== Urbanism and architecture ===
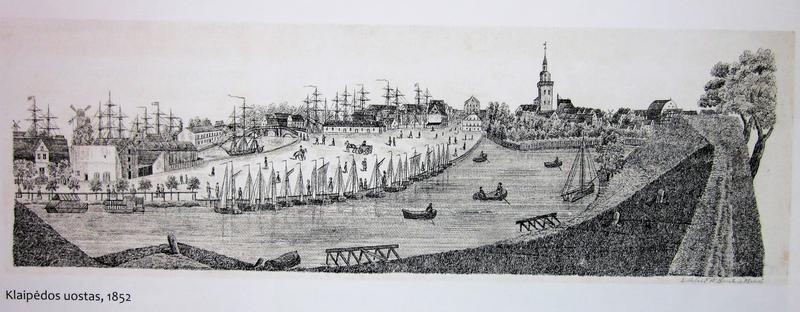
Port of Klaipėda in 1852

The city plan is linear, stretching along the shores of the Curonian Lagoon and the Baltic Sea. The main parts of the city Old Town on the left bank of the Danė River, as well as the new residential areas built after 1945 (Pempininkai, Naujakiemis, Alksnynė, Gedminai, and others). The specifics of the port city are emphasized by the quays, warehouses, half-timbered and industrial buildings typical of the Klaipėda Region. In the Old Town of Klaipėda, a rectangular network of streets was formed in the 13th–15th centuries, including Naujamiestis on the right bank of the Danė River.

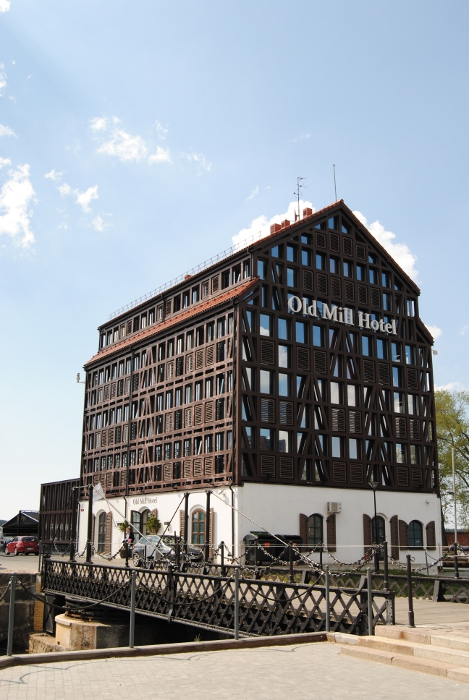
"Old Mill hotel", a look alike fachwerk style building

Some of the fortification structures that were built before the 20th century and facilities have survived. Klaipėda Castle, which was used from the 13th through 18th centuries, as well as its accompanying bastion, built from 1559 remains on the left bank of the Danė River. Klaipėda Castle's bastion complex, which dates from the 15th through 18th centuries, still exists on the right bank of Danė River. Old public buildings, including Theater Palace, which was built on the site of a burnt-down Neoclassical building in 1857, still exist on the old town in Klaipėda. Half-timbered and brick warehouses and residential houses are prevalent throughout Klaipėda.

Following the fire of 1854, the city was intensively rebuilt. In the Naujamiestis district, which began to form in the second half of the 19th century, notable historical buildings include the State Bank (1858), Courthouse (1862), the railway station (1875), the Louise Gymnasium (1891), the neo-Gothic Post Office (1890, architect H. Schoede), the barracks complex (1907, now Klaipėda University Central Palace), Teachers' Seminary (1908), City Hospital (1902), and the Craftsmen's Shelter (1910).

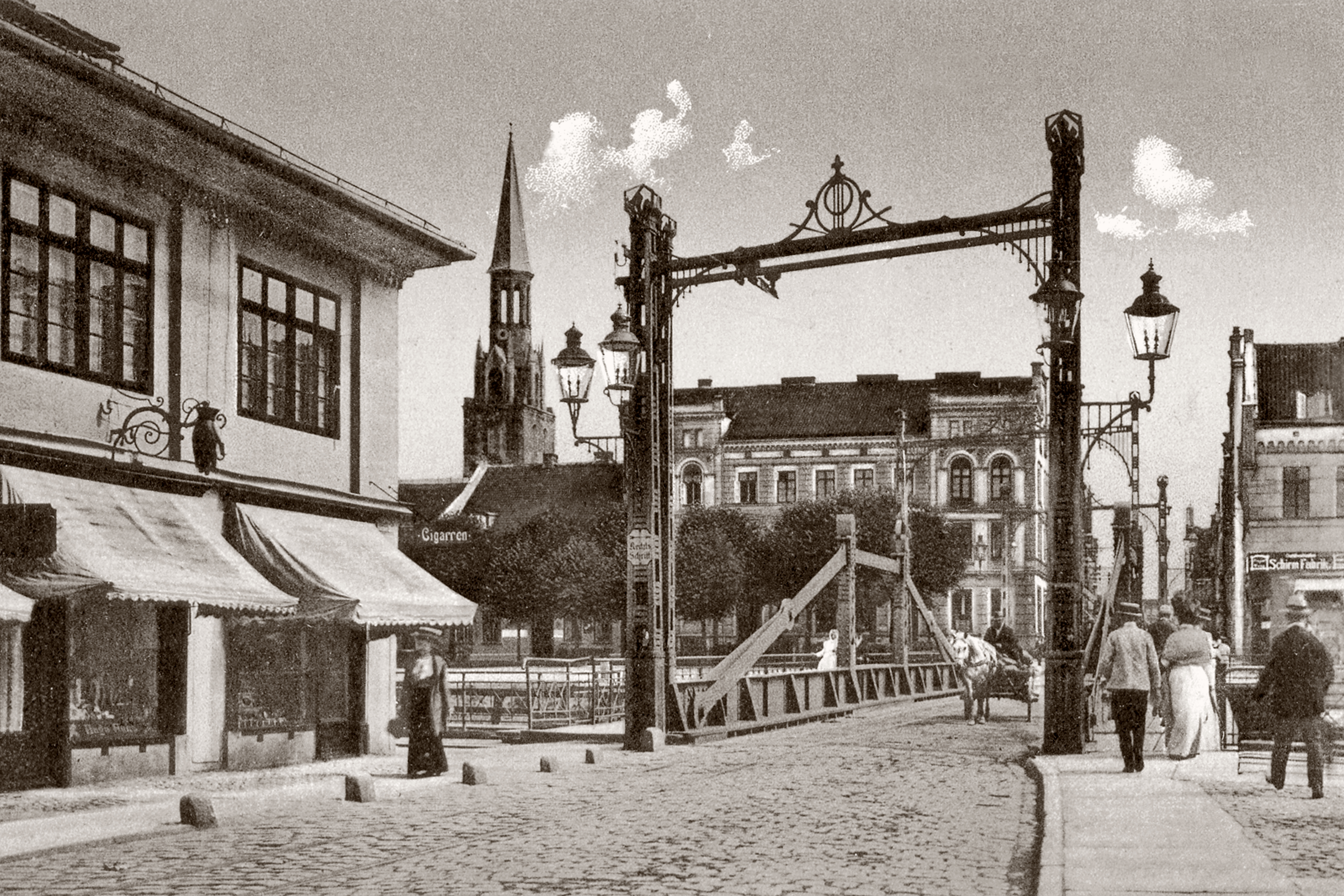
Biržos Bridge, photographed before 1930. The bascule bridge was an important source of income for the city.

Furthermore, during this period, many residential houses and various other buildings were built. For instance, residential buildings were built on Liepų Street. Also, a neoclassical palace was built in Liepų Street 12. The palace would get expanded around 1820 as well as in the late 19th century. The palace is now used as the Klaipėda Clock and Watch Museum. Also, a wooden villa in Giruliai, Šlaito Street 4 was built in the second half of the 19th century. Furthermore, a Neo-Renaissance villa was built in 1874. The aforementioned villa is now used as the Klaipėda County I. Simonaitytė Public Library. Industrial buildings, including a gas factory built in 1861 by the architect J. Hartmann, the fachwerk Union Chemical Fertilizer Factory built in 1869–80, the pulp factory built in 1900 and later expanded to form 1994 Klaipėda Cardboard Company, were also extensively constructed. Furthermore, a bascule bridge was built over the canal between the castle and the Danė River in 1855. The bascule bridge had important economic impacts for the city, as every passing vessel was required to pay a bridge lifting fee.

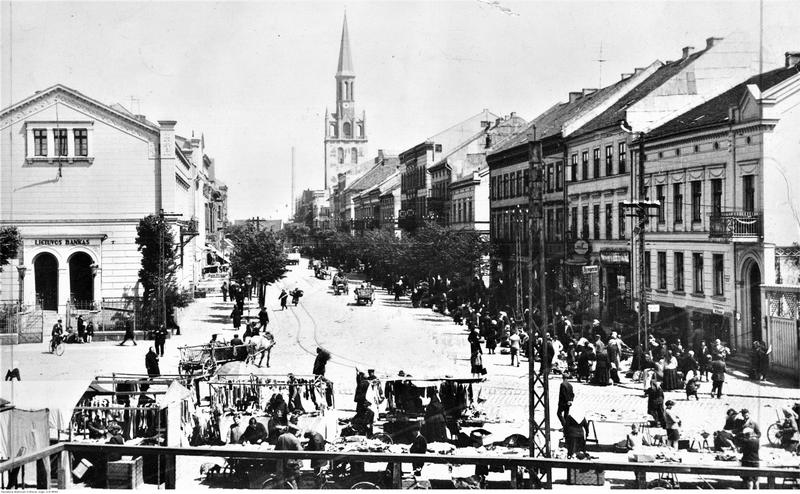
Klaipėda Old Town in 1932

In the early 20th century, Jugendstil style buildings were built in the city, including houses at Tiltų Street 13 and H. Manto Street 30, as well as a villa at Smiltynės Street 11. Following the Restoration of Independence of Lithuania and the Klaipėda Revolt, the Red Cross Hospital (1933, architect R. Steikūnas; now Klaipėda County Hospital), Vytautas Magnus Gymnasium (1934, architect H. Reissmann), Klaipėda Pedagogical Institute Sports Hall (1937, architect V. Landsbergis ‑ Žemkalnis; known since 2005 as the Klaipėda Physical Culture and Recreation Center), City Savings Bank (1938), Power Plant Complex (3rd–4th decade of the 20th century, architect of some buildings H. Reissmann) were built and are characterized by rationalist features.

During World War II, 60% of the buildings in Klaipėda were destroyed. Moreover, the buildings reminiscent of Klaipėda's Germans were destroyed, and the remains of bombed-out Catholic and evangelical Reformed churches were demolished.

During the Soviet occupation, the historical part of Klaipėda was redesigned. The construction of the St. Church of the Queen Mary of Peace was started in 1957 with the funding of the believers (architect J. Baltrėnas). However, in 1960, it was deprived of believers. Instead, a branch of the LSSR Philharmonic was established there in 1963. The building would later be used as a place of worship again in 1988. Other notable constructions from that period include the Palace of Culture (1963, architect A. Mikėnas, now Klaipėda Musical Theater), Marriage Palace (1980, architect R. V. Kraniauskas), Lithuanian Maritime Museum and Aquarium (1979, architects P. Lapė, L. Šliogerienė; located in Kopgalis Fortress, 1866), and Hotel Klaipėda (1986, architect G. Tiškus; now Amberton Klaipėda).

Following the Re-Establishment of the State of Lithuania, the Dolphinarium of the Lithuanian Maritime Museum (1994, architect P. Lapė), large shopping centers, administrative buildings, hotels and residential buildings were built.

== Education ==
=== Primary and secondary education ===
Klaipėda Vytautas the Great Gymnasium, the first Lithuanian gymnasium in the city, est. in 1922

Since the 14th century, Klaipėda has been a center for education in Lithuania Minor. During the period of Teutonic Knights there were so-called Latin schools near the city churches in Pilsotas, the northern part of the Klaipėda Region inhabited by the Curonians, however most of the schools were established in Sambia Peninsula.

During the period of the Duchy of Prussia schools in Lithuania Minor were created based on the regulations of the church authorities. In the 16th century a dozen Lithuanian parochial schools operated in the Duchy of Prussia. The earliest documented fact about teachers in Klaipėda dates to 1540 when a tax payer was described as "living with the teacher". Around 1590, the Lithuanian community became independent, and then in ~1620 a separate Klaipėdian Parochial School was opened in a house built on a plot belonging to a priest of the Lithuanian Church, located between the extension of John's Street and Market's Street, but the church and school were demolished in 1627. In 1687, a new Lithuanian Church was built in the Friedrich's suburb and the Lithuanian Parochial School was also established next to it. At the beginning of the 19th century, the significance of the Lithuanian Parochial School in Klaipėda decreased and in 1817 the Magistrate of Klaipėda occupied the building and the school ceased its activity after operating for nearly 300 years.

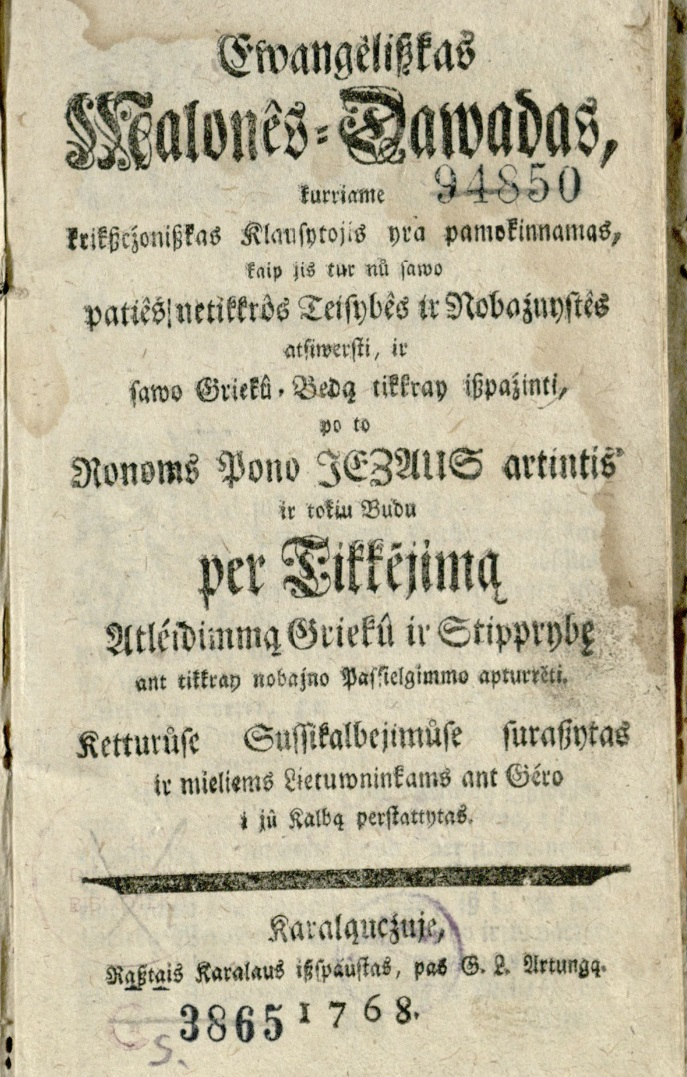
Ewangeliszkas Malonės Dawadas, a popular 18th century educational book in Lithuanian

In the first half of the 18th century King Frederick William I carried out a reform of the Prussian education system and was one of the first in Europe to try to implement universal primary education. Out of 1160 new primary schools 275 were established in Lithuanian Province which included Klaipėda. Moreover, Lutheranism provisions encouraged the use of the language of the local people in public life, including in church schools, and in the 18th century the number of primary schools in Lithuanian counties eventually risen to 449 (in 340 of them pupils were taught only in Lithuanian or in German). Nevertheless, a big obstacle for Lithuanian children to study was serfdom which was abolished in Prussia only in 1763. In the 19th century, mixed schools resulted in Germanisation of Lithuanian pupils as bilingual schools eventually became monolingual German. In the interwar period Klaipėda became part of Lithuania since 1923, however in this period out of 102 schools only four were Lithuanian and seven were mixed German–Lithuanian in the entire Klaipėda Region.

Stasio Šimkaus Conservatory

At the end of the 17th century, the Great School (or the Latin School) was established which was the first upper school in Klaipėda, and in ~1850 the school was granted gymnasium status, while in 1891 it was named after Queen Louise. In 1829, the Klaipėda Navigation School was established due to the demand to train navigators and sea captains. In 1902, the Klaipėda Teachers' Seminary was established with an objective to prepare teachers who know Lithuanian language. In 1923, the Klaipėda Conservatory was established on the initiative of composer Stasys Šimkus to educate professional musicians which is still active. In 1925, the Klaipėda Accelerated School was established alongside its German counterpart which after 2 years studies provided an opportunity to its graduates to continues studies in the gymnasium.

Currently, Klaipėda has 12 gymnasiums, 3 primary schools, 17 progymnasiums, and 4 elementary schools. Additionally, there is Eduardo Balsio Gymnasium of Arts. Most of pupils in Klaipėda later study in universities or colleges, as Lithuania is one of the world's leading countries in OECD's statistics of population with tertiary education (58.15% of 25–34-year-olds in 2022).

=== Tertiary education ===
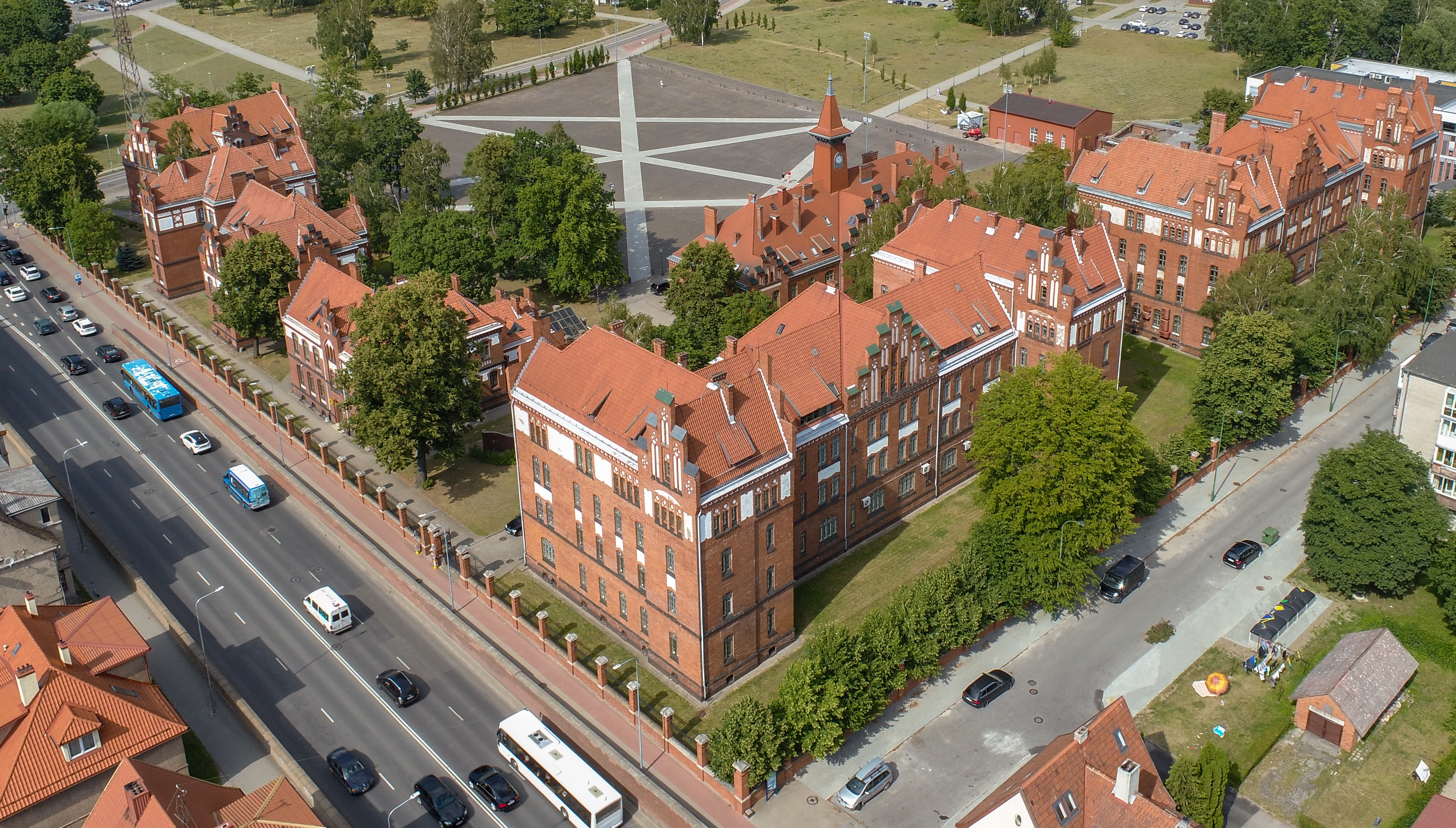
Academic campus of Klaipėda University

LCC International University

Initially, Klaipėda had no university, therefore many Klaipėdians and prominent Lithuanians from Lithuania Minor and Lithuania proper studied and lectured at the University of Königsberg which was established in 1544 with a permission of Sigismund I the Old and had equal status to the University of Kraków. From 1718 to 1944, the University of Königsberg organized the Lithuanian language seminar, being the first independent discipline of Lithuanian language in higher education.

In the interwar period, three high schools were established in Klaipėda. The Klaipėda Trade Institute (est. in 1934) had three departments: banking, commercial, and consular (since 1937: banking–commercial and consular). The Klaipėda Pedagogical Institute (est. in 1935) which prepared higher qualification teachers for primary schools. The Klaipėda Regional Pedagogical Institute (est. in 1935) which prepared higher qualification teachers for regional German schools. There also were proposals to establish a university in Klaipėda, however the German annexation of the Klaipėda Region in 1939 and subsequently occurred sovietization of Lithuania prevented it from being realized.

In the Soviet period, branches of the Kaunas Polytechnic Institute (1959) and Šiauliai Pedagogical Institute (1971), as well as the Faculty of Preschool Education of the Šiauliai Pedagogical Institute (1975), and the Klaipėda Ecology Centre of the Lithuanian Academy of Sciences were established in Klaipėda. In 1990, following the re-establishment of the State of Lithuania, they were merged to establish Klaipėda University. The Klaipėda University has three faculties (Marine Technology and Natural Sciences, of Social Sciences and Humanities, and of Health Sciences) and two institutes (Marine Research Institute and Institute of Baltic Region History and Archaeology). In 2019, Klaipėda University joined the EU-CONEXUS, which is an international alliance of coastal cities universities aiming to enhance cooperation. Every year, over 3,000 students study at Klaipėda University, while nearly 40,000 are alumni.

Another university operating in Klaipėda is the LCC International University, which is an ecumenical Christian university providing liberal arts education of social sciences and humanities. The majority of its students are internationals from tens of countries worldwide.

Four colleges operate in Klaipėda: Klaipėda University of Applied Sciences, Lithuania Business College, SMK High School, and Lithuanian Maritime Academy. Moreover, the Vilnius Academy of Arts and the Lithuanian Academy of Music and Theatre also have faculties in Klaipėda.

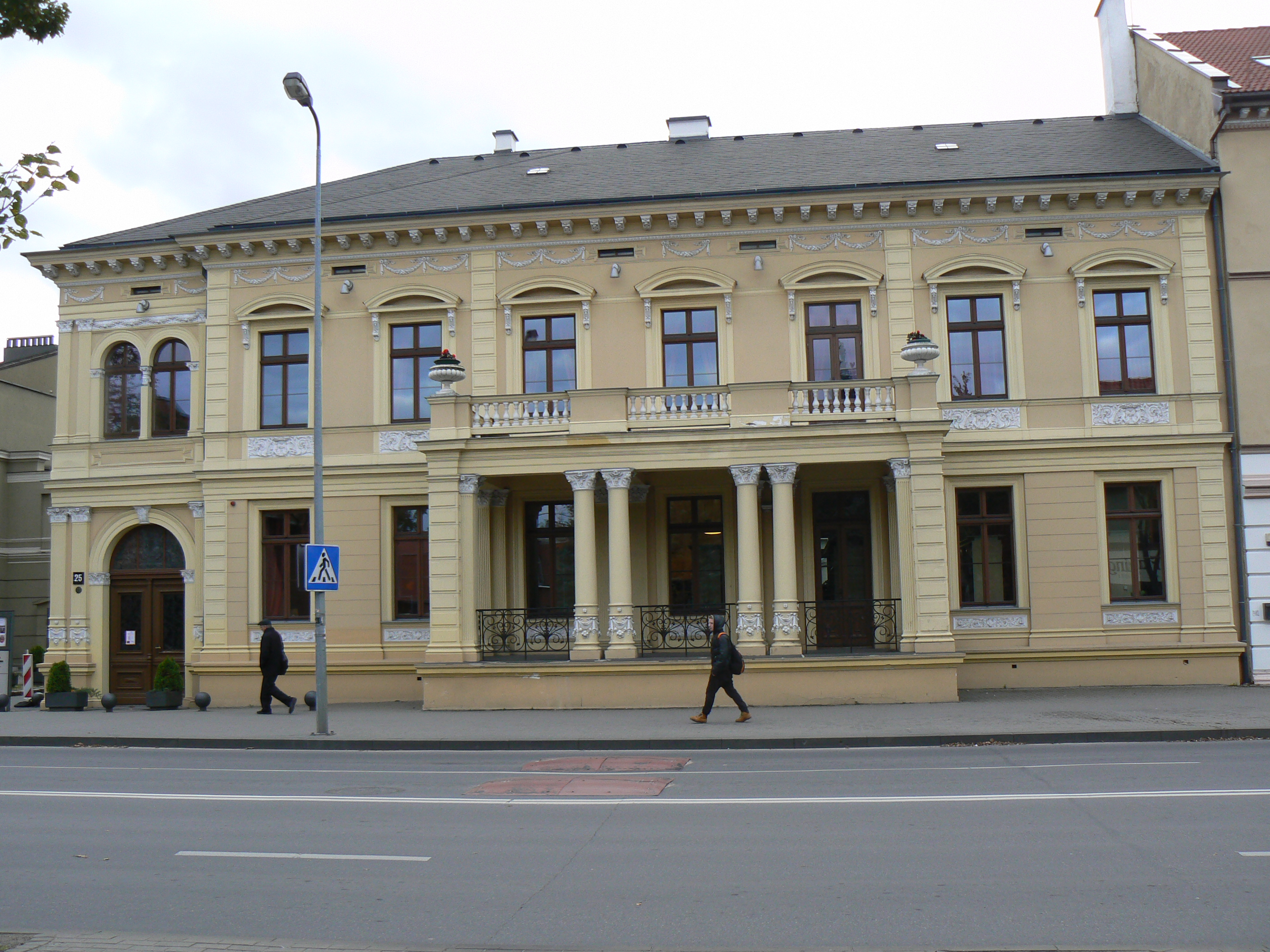
Ieva Simonaitytė Public Library

=== Libraries ===
A number of libraries are located in Klaipėda, with the most notable being Klaipėda University Library (est. in 1991, containing hundreds of thousands of publications copies), Klaipėda City Municipality Immanuel Kant Public Library (est. in 1920, having 20 departments), Klaipėda County Ieva Simonaitytė Public Library (est. in 1950, having over 900,000 documents, of which nearly 600,000 are books), etc.

== Notable buildings ==
K and D complex

The tallest building in Klaipėda is Pilsotas, which is a 34-storey building.

Tallest buildings
Name	Stories	Height	Built	Purpose	Status
Pilsotas	34	111.9 m.	2007	Residential	Built
BIG 2 Complex	25	72–82 m.	2009	Mixed use	Built
K Tower	20	71.9 m.	2006	Office	Built
D Tower	20	71.9 m.	2006	Residential	Built
Klaipėdos burė	22	66 m.	2009	Residential	Built
Aukštoji Smeltė	20	66 m.	2009	Residential	Under construction
Minijos Banga	20	62.2 m.	2007	Residential	Built
Neapolis Business Centre	16	56.7 m.	2007	Office	Built
Baltijos Avenue Tower	15	50 m.	2002	Residential	Built
Vėtrungė	13	42 m.	–	Retail	Built

== Transportation ==
=== Railway ===
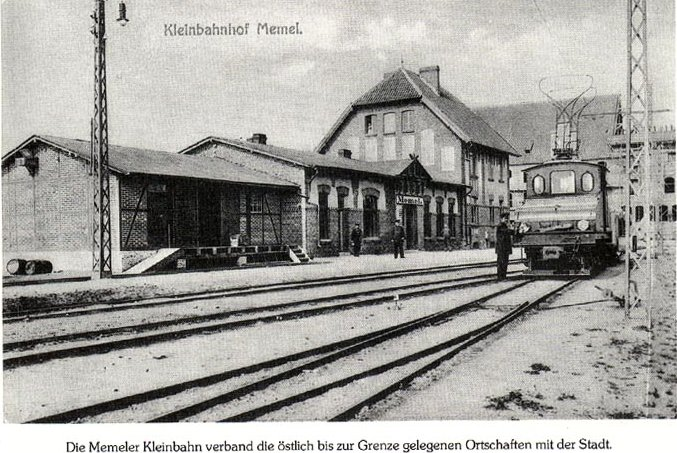
A narrow gauge railway station in 1920

The Klaipėda railway station (Lithuanian: Klaipėdos geležinkelio stotis) is located at Priestočio g. 1, north of the Old Town.

The railway station consists of two buildings. The old building, made of yellow bricks and reflecting features of Classical architecture, was built in 1881. Currently, the building hosts various small businesses. The new railway station was built of red bricks in 1983.

The railway network of then Prussia reached Klaipėda in 1878. Initially used for lumber and fish freight on the Klaipėda–Šilutė and Klaipėda–Šilutė–Pagėgiai routes, the railway grid network of Lithuania Minor received a major boost after the Klaipėda uprising and the annexation of the region by Lithuania in 1923.

As of 2025, Lithuanian Railways operate two routes from Klaipėda railway station, with 5 daily trains each: routes Klaipėda – Vilnius and Klaipėda – Radviliškis. Train tickets can be obtained at the station or with a surcharge onboard the train.

The railway station is served by the following buses of Klaipėda city passenger transport:

- No. 9 south of the city – city hospital (via Central Klaipėda Terminal)
- No. 6 south of the city – Melnragė district (Melnragė beaches)
- No. 8 south of city – bus station (through Old town)
- No. 15 south of the city – city hospital
- No. 100 bus station – Palanga International Airport (PLQ)

=== Airport ===
Palanga International Airport

Domestic and international commercial scheduled airline services are provided by Palanga International Airport. The airport is connected with Klaipėda by a city bus.

Klaipėda also has a small, privately run aerodrome with a focus on sports aviation and charter services.

=== Ferries ===
==== Ferries to Smiltynė ====
View to the Klaipėda central ferry port terminal – the Old Ferry port

Klaipėda is located next to the Curonian Spit and a small part of the peninsula (Smiltynė) is within Klaipėda. People can reach the peninsula by ferry using one of the two terminals:

- The Old ferry terminal (Danės st. 1) – ferry from city center for passengers traveling on foot or with bikes;
- The New ferry terminal (Nemuno st. 8) – ferry for people with motorized vehicles.

==== International ferries ====
In Klaipėda, there are three ferry lines and two ferry companies: DFDS Seaways and TT-Line.

Ferries depart from the Central Klaipėda Terminal (CKT). DFDS operates ferries to Kiel (Germany) and Karlshamn (Sweden), and TT-Line ferries head to Trelleborg (Sweden).

=== Buses ===
Klaipėda Bus Station

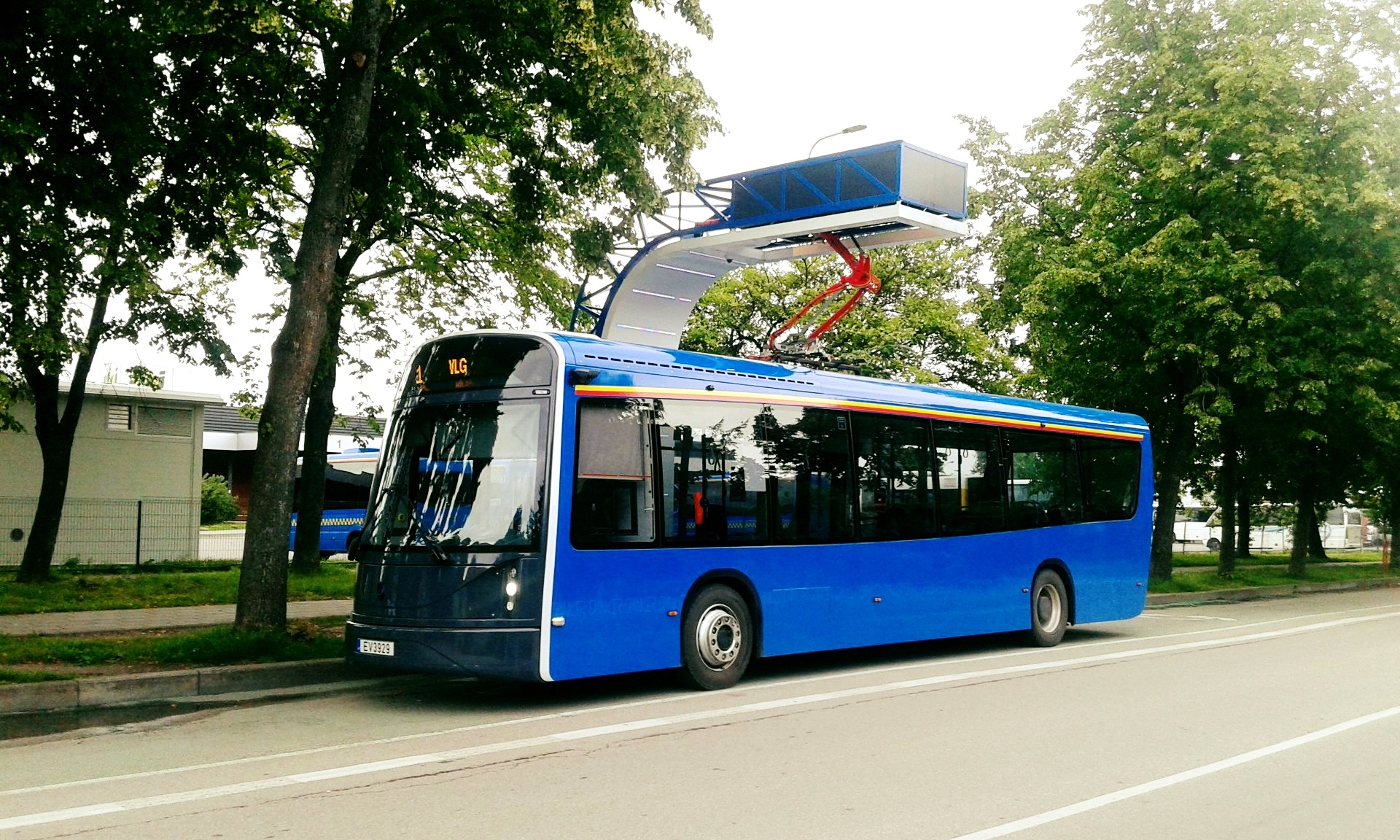
Electric bus Dancer, manufactured in the Klaipėda Free Economic Zone and used for city's public transportation since 2020

Klaipėda's bus public transportation is arranged in a north–south axis, based on three parallel principal streets, running along the coast of Curonian Lagoon and thus making the grid logical and comfortable for commuting.

In shops and newsstands, electronic cards could be bought for the purpose of paying for transportation. Public transport is organized, supervised and coordinated by the Klaipėda city passenger transport.

Buses to other cities and towns depart from Klaipėda bus station (Butkų Juzės g. 9). Buses to Curonian Spit villages, Nida and Juodkrantė, depart from a bus stop in Smiltynė (next to the Old ferry terminal).

=== Trams ===
Trams in Klaipėda functioned in 1904—1934 and 1950–1967. It was the only tram transport in the history of Lithuania, as well as the last years of first independent Lithuania, then in Soviet Lithuania. It was an interurban transport which was operated by Memeler Kleinbahn AG company.

The tram system had two lines with 12 km of tracks and 17 tramcars. The first line was from the old city (lighthouse and Strandvilla restaurant) through center and northern suburbs, which included Royal (Didžioji) Vitė and Bomelio Vitė localities. Eventually, the route would go to beaches, then to Melnragė, a resort. The second line was from the old city through Royal Smeltė, an industrial suburb, then south to Wilhelm Channel and Wooden Bay. Line The tram lines were all connected to the stock exchange in the center of the city. Branches of the tram routes connected the center with railway station through Liepaja (now Manto) Street and Liepaja (now Lietuvninku) Square. Another tram route passed near the Winter Port through the Vite locality. In 1950—1967 tram run functioned in line to Smeltė only. Tram lines were used for delivery of goods from railways and ports. Eventually, the tram degraded and closed due to wear, as well as lack of funds for its renewal and development.

City authorities are currently planning to revitalize the tram system in Klaipėda. The proposed tram routes plan to connect Klaipėda with Šventoji through Palanga International Airport, as well as Palanga. In 2017, a feasibility study began for first tram line on Herkus Manto and Taikos streets.

== Old town ==
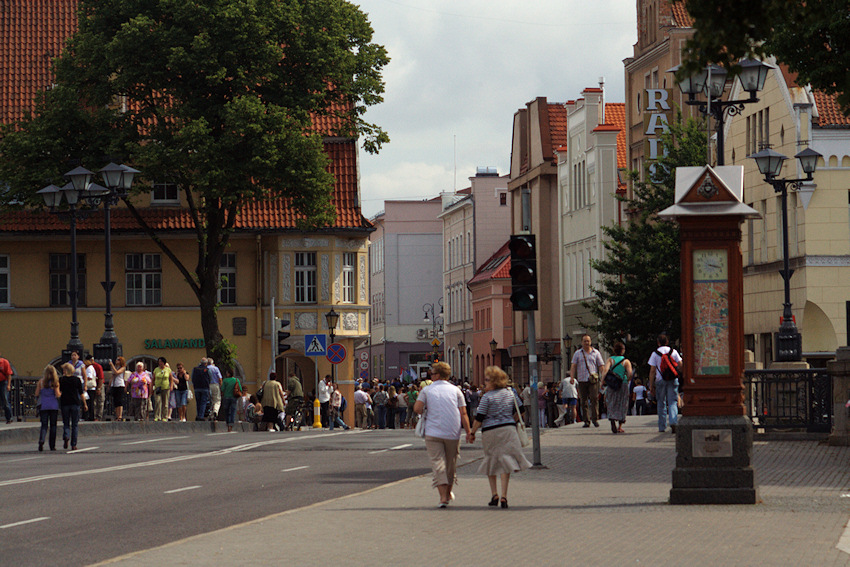
Old town of Klaipėda

Klaipėda's Old Town is notable among other towns in Lithuania for its abundance of German architecture. Klaipėda's Old Town is unique with its fachwerk architectural style and its planned street structure, which is uncharacteristic to any other old town in Lithuania. Its streets are geometrically configured very correctly, and the angle of intersection is straight.

One of the most popular places in Klaipėda's old town is The Theatre Square. It hosts a variety of concerts, the Sea Festival, the International Jazz Festival and other events. An important focus of the Theatre Square is the Taravos Anikė sculpture depicting a youthful barefoot girl. The sculpture was erected in the memory of the poet Simonas Dachas and perpetuates one of the poet's described heroes.

== Sports ==
Club	Sport	League	Venue
Neptūnas	Basketball	Lithuanian Basketball League (LKL), Eurocup (Eurocup)	Švyturio Arena
Klaipėdos Neptūnas-Akvaservis	Basketball	National Basketball League (NKL)	Žalgirio sporto rūmai
LCC TU	Basketball	Regional Basketball League (RKL)	Michaelsen Centre
Tekoda	Basketball	defunct	Žalgirio sporto rūmai
Neptūnas	Basketball	Lithuanian Women Basketball League (LMKL)	Žalgirio Sporto Rūmai
Dragūnas	Handball	Lithuanian Handball League (LRL)	Neptūnas Hall
Kuršiai	Rugby	Lithuanian Rugby Union I Group	Žalgiris Stadium
Neptūnas	Football	I Lyga	Žalgiris Stadium
Atlantas	Football	defunct	
FK Klaipedos Granitas	Football	defunct	
FK Sendvaris	Football	Sunday football league SFL League (SFL Lyga)	Football school stadium
Sadvita	Hockey	Lithuania Hockey League (NVLRL)	Klaipedos Akropolis Ice Arena
Skatas - 95	Hockey	Lithuania Hockey League (NVLRL)	Klaipedos Akropolis Ice Arena
Kirai	Hockey	Lithuania Hockey League (NVLRL)	Klaipedos Akropolis Ice Arena
Toras	Hockey	Lithuania Hockey League (NVLRL)	Klaipedos Akropolis Ice Arena
Marių Meškos	Ultimate	Lithuanian Ultimate Frisbee federation I group	Smiltynė beach, Indoor halls
	Ultimate	SUN BEAM (tournament)	Smiltynė beach
Scala dream	Rock climbing	Inhouse climbing club with top Lithuanian climbers	Indoor climbing facility
Fabrique	Rock climbing	Inhouse climbing club with top Lithuanian climbers	Indoor climbing facility

== Economy ==
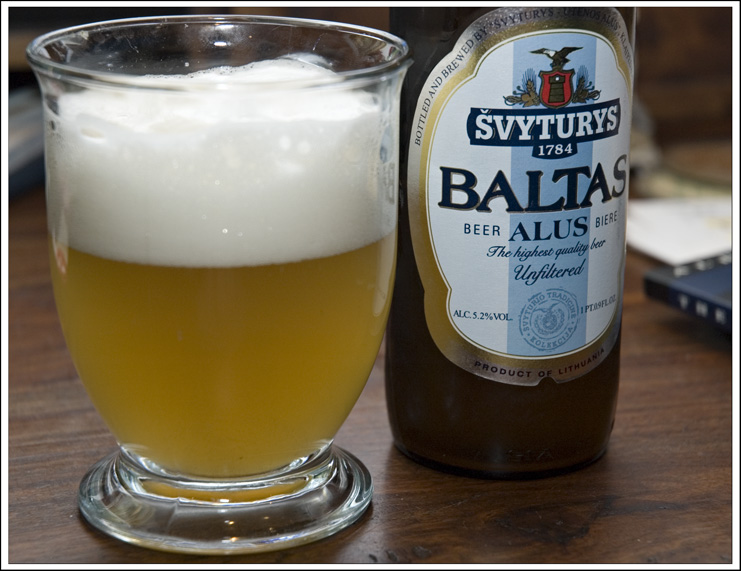
Klaipėda is famous for Švyturys brewery, established in 1784

Klaipėda generates approximately 12 percent of Lithuania's GDP and about 80 percent of western Lithuania's GDP. Much of Klaipėda's economy is impacted by trade in the Port of Klaipėda. In the eastern part of the city, there is the Klaipėda Free Economic Zone, which offers 0 percent tax incentives for first 6 years.

Klaipėda also the location of the first Geothermal Demonstration Plant in the Baltic states, which supplies with geothermal heating and Klaipėda Combined Heat and Power Plant. In 2014, Klaipėda LNG FSRU with FSRU Independence ship was opened and guaranteed the alternative way of supplying the country with gas.

Most of the city's GDP is generated in the service sector. Inhabitants of Klaipėda have a higher income than the average of Lithuania. Companies in Klaipėda include BLRT Western Shipyard, DFDS Lisco, Švyturys, Klaipėdos jūrų krovinių kompanija, Grigeo Klaipėda and Balticum TV.

According to the Lithuanian Department of Statistics, the GDP in the second quarter of 2017 as compared with the first quarter of 2017, has increased by 7.7 percent, while comparing with the second quarter of 2016 it has increased by 4.0 percent. The rise is also planned in the further years.

== Media ==
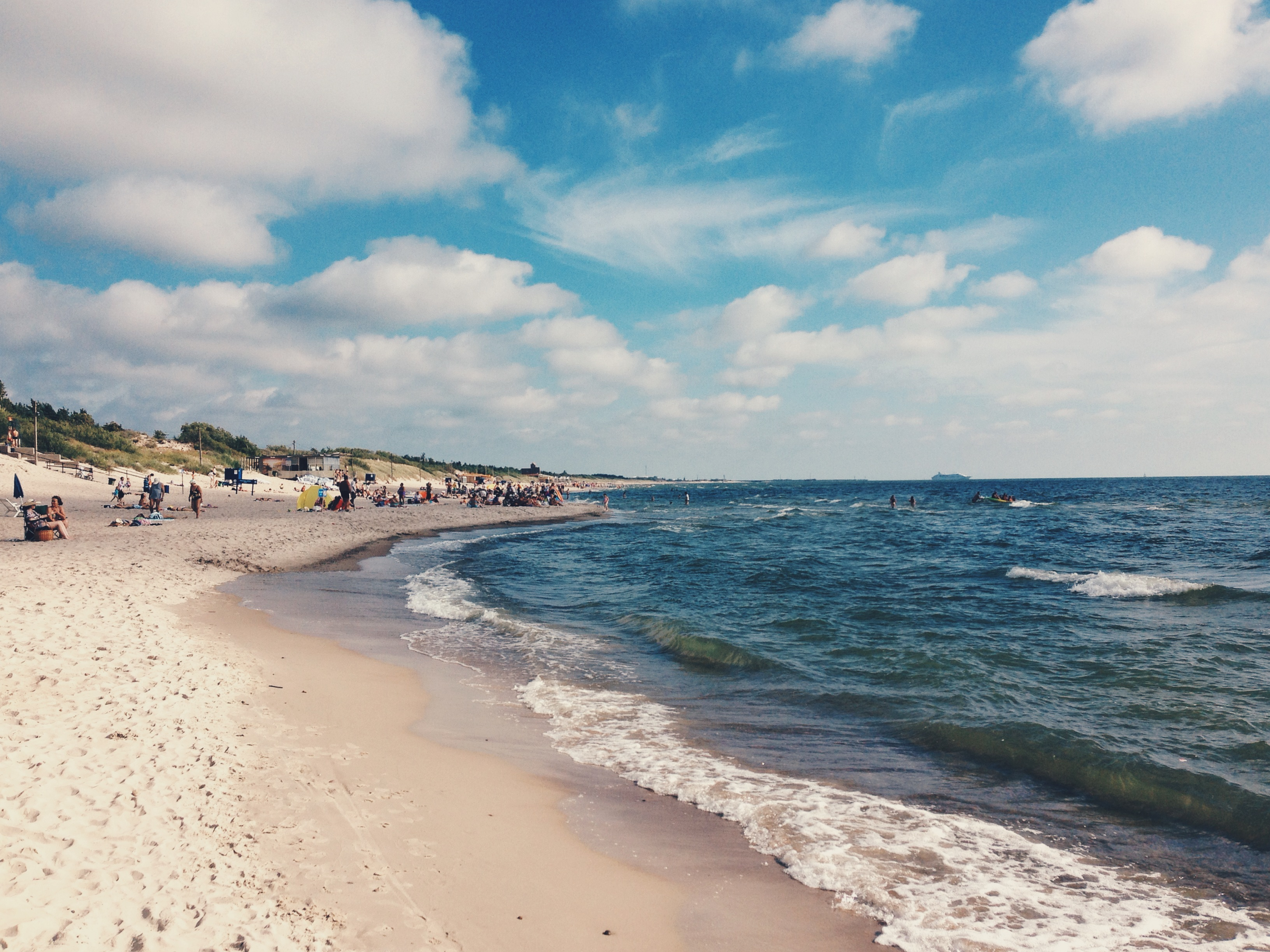
Klaipėda beach

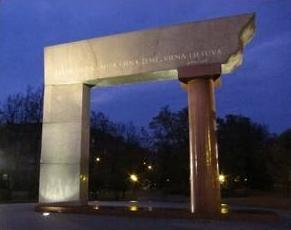
Arka Monument for united Lithuania

=== Radio ===
- Radijas 9 91.4 FM
- Laluna 94.9 FM
- Kelyje 99.8 FM
- Raduga 100.8 FM
- European Hit Radio 96.2 FM
- Power Hit Radio 96.7 FM
- Zip FM 92.5 FM

=== Television ===
- Balticum TV

=== Newspapers ===
- Vakarų ekspresas
- Klaipėda

== Notable residents ==
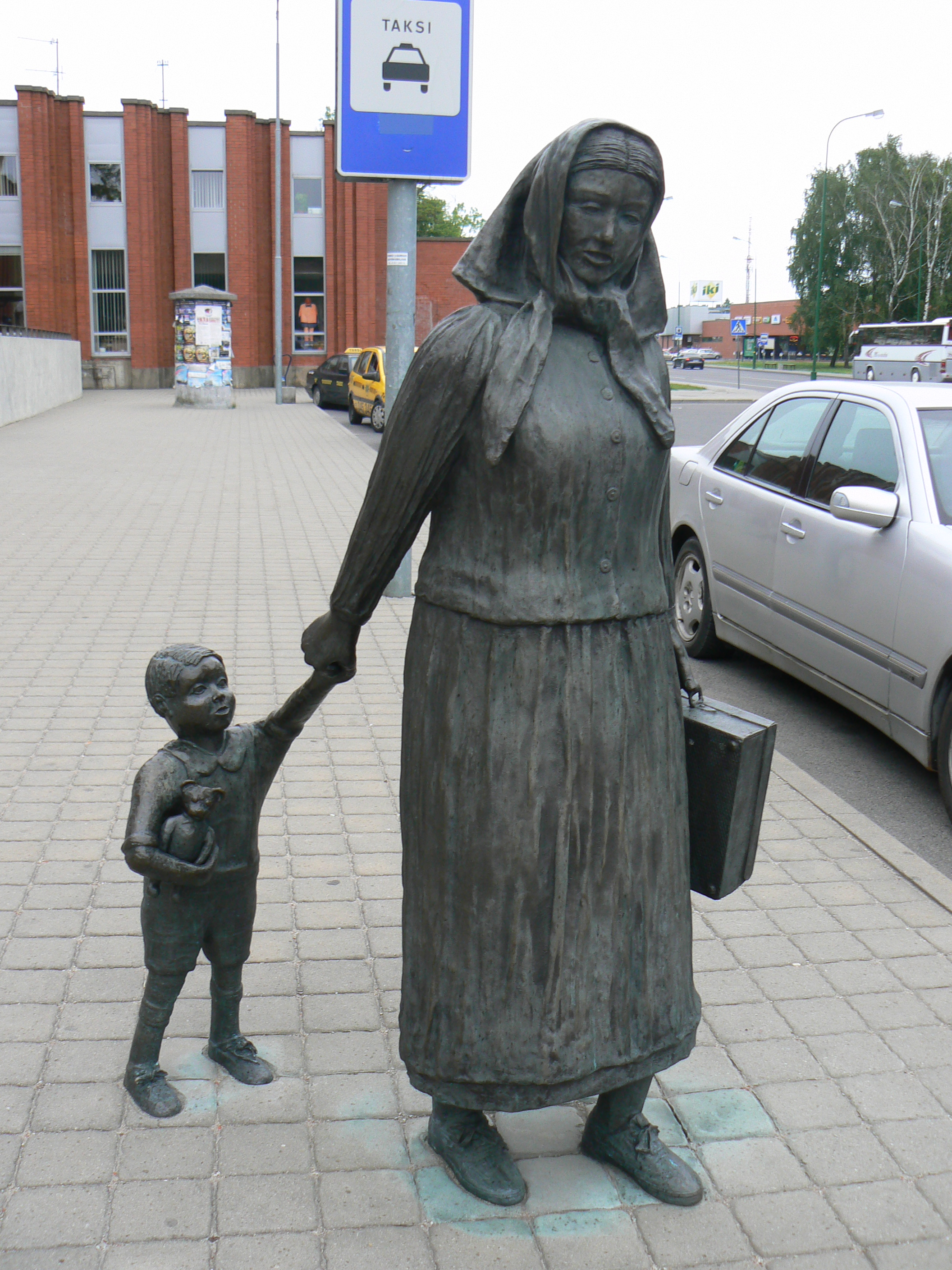
Sculpture next to Klaipėda Railway Station

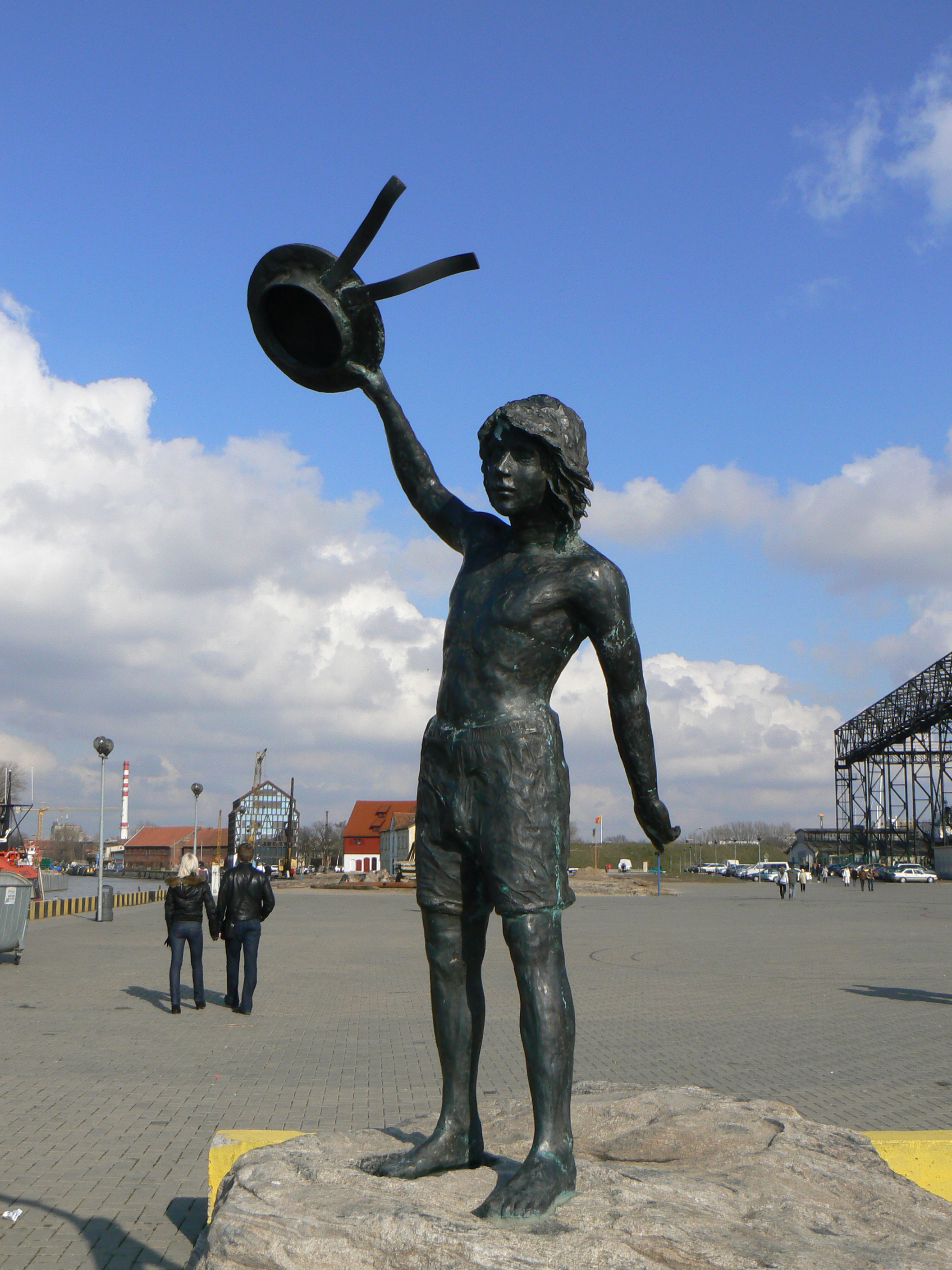
Statue of a boy in Klaipėda harbor

Modern buildings in Klaipėda

- Simon Dach (1605–1659), poet and writer of the Ännchen von Tharau song
- Matthäus Prätorius (1635–1704), Protestant pastor, historian, ethnographer
- David Wilkins (1685–1745), a Prussian orientalist, settled in England
- Michael Wohlfahrt (1687–1741), religious leader in Pennsylvania
- Andreas Murray (1695–1771), Swedish priest
- Johan Daniel Berlin (1714–1787), Norwegian rococo composer and organist
- Friedrich Wilhelm Argelander (1799–1875), astronomer
- Yisrael Salanter (1810–1883), founder of Musar movement within Judaism
- Julius Kröhl (1820–1867), German-American submarine pioneer
- James Hobrecht (1825–1902), German director for urban planning of Berlin
- Isaac Rülf (1831–1902), editor-in-chief of Memeler Dampfboot, philosopher, activist
- David Wolffsohn (1856–1914), second president of World Zionist Organization
- Clara Schlaffhorst (1863–1945), a German singer and promoter of physical education
- George Adomeit (1879–1967), a Prussian-American painter and printmaker
- Charlotte Susa (1898–1976), a German actress
- Arno Esch (1928–1951) liberal politician in (SBZ) (Soviet Occupied Zone)
- Gerhard Spiegler (1929–2015), academic, former President of Elizabethtown College, Pennsylvania
- Tomas Venclova (born 1937), poet and author
- Lena Valaitis (born 1943), pop singer, she finished second at the Eurovision Song Contest 1981.
- Hans Henning Atrott (born 1944), philosopher and pro-euthanasia activist
- Eugenijus Jovaiša (born 1950), historian, archaeologist, and professor
- Leonidas Donskis (1962–2016), philosopher and critic
- Gitanas Nausėda, (born 1964), politician and economist and 9th President of Lithuania
- Mindaugas Piecaitis (born 1969), conductor/composer of Catcerto for Nora the Piano Cat
- Violeta "Sati" Jurkonienė (born 1976), Lithuanian singer
- Kristina Tučkutė (born 1983), fashion model
- Gintaras Januševičius, (born 1985), pianist, music educator and radio presenter
- Monika Liu, (born 1988), singer-songwriter

=== Sport ===
- Werner Ulrich (born 1940), East German sprint canoer
- Eurelijus Žukauskas (born 1973), basketball player
- Rolandas Muraška (born 1973), tennis player
- Saulius Štombergas (born 1973), basketball player
- Tomas Danilevičius (born 1978), footballer, played 353 games and 71 for Lithuania
- Živilė Rezgytė, (born 1978), rhythmic gymnast and business executive
- Arvydas Macijauskas (born 1980), basketball player
- Tomas Delininkaitis (born 1982), basketball player
- Tomas Vaitkus (born 1982), cycling champion
- Valdas Vasylius (born 1983), basketball player
- Tauras Tunyla (born 1993), racing driver

== Twin towns – sister cities ==
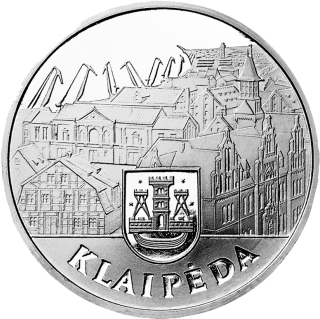
Litas commemorative coin dedicated to Klaipėda city (2002)

Klaipėda is twinned with:

- Cleveland, United States
- Debrecen, Hungary
- Gdynia, Poland
- Karlskrona, Sweden
- Kotka, Finland
- Kuji, Japan
- Liepāja, Latvia
- Lübeck, Germany
- Mannheim, Germany
- North Tyneside, England, United Kingdom
- Odesa, Ukraine
- Sassnitz, Germany
- Szczecin, Poland
- Mersin, Turkey

The city was previously twinned with:

- Cherepovets, Russia
- Kaliningrad, Russia
- Mogilev, Belarus

=== Cooperation agreements ===
Klaipėda has an additional cooperation agreement with:

- Porto, Portugal

== See also ==
- Neighborhoods of Klaipėda
- Ports of the Baltic Sea
