= Evangelical Reformed Church, Klaipėda =

Continental Reformed Protestantism church in Klaipėda, Lithuania

Evangelical Reformed Church Evangelikų reformatų bažnyčia Evangelisch-reformierte Kirche
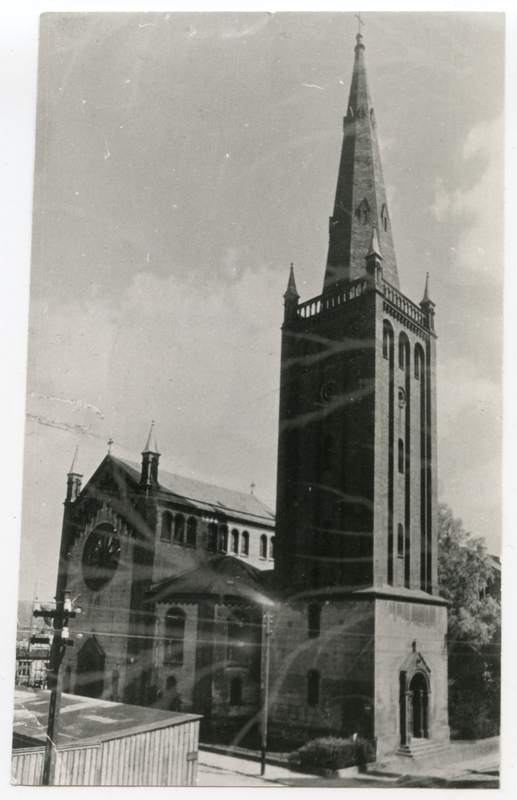
- Façade of the church and belfry in the 1930s

Religion
- Affiliation: Continental Reformed Protestantism
- District: Klaipėda Old Town
- Ecclesiastical or organizational status: Demolished
- Leadership: Prussian Union of Churches
- Year consecrated: 1683

Location
- Location: Klaipėda, Lithuania

Architecture
- Architect: Friedrich August Stüler
- Type: Church
- Style: Gothic Revival, Romanesque Revival
- Completed: 1683
- Demolished: After World War II
- Materials: Brick masonry

The Evangelical Reformed Church (Lithuanian: Evangelikų reformatų bažnyčia; German: Evangelisch-reformierte Kirche) was a Reformed Protestantism church in Klaipėda, Lithuania. The church was constructed in 1683 and was the first Reformed Protestantism church in Klaipėda. The church was damaged during the World War II and was demolished by the Soviet authorities who later built an apartment building in its site (now Tiltų St. 19).

== History ==
The first information about the Protestant Reformation in Klaipėda dates back to the time of the Swedish occupation of Klaipėda. Nevertheless, even earlier individual Scottish merchants of the Protestant Reformation faith had already settled in Klaipėda as in the 17th century there were three or four families of them, who supported a house priest and teacher, Johann Wendelin de Rodem, who came from the Electoral Palatinate.

In 1661, Johann Wendelin de Rodem received permission from the Prince-elector, Frederick William, to come to Klaipėda every quarter to pastor the Protestant Reformats. After Johann Wendelin de Rodem's death on April 18, 1666, the small community of the Klaipėda Protestant Reformats in 1667 received the privilege of the regional government to buy a private house in which their preacher would hold services and Petr Figulus Jablonský was invited by Prince Bogusław Radziwiłł to preach in the same year. Jablonský was born in Jablunkov, Kingdom of Bohemia, on the Moravian border, and was the son-in-law of the famous Czech educator John Amos Comenius.

During the Great Fire of November 1678, the church and the residential building used for Protestant Reformats services burned down, and later services were held in the Lutheran castle and garrison church, until Andreas Jurskis (hailing from Lithuania proper) was able to consecrate a new brick church decorated with a small tower in 1683, the cornerstone of which was laid on July 12, 1681. This church was built on the site where later during the Soviet era after World War II an apartment building was built instead of the church (Tiltų St. 19).

After Andreas Jurskis, the famous doctor Adam Samuel Hartmann worked as preacher, who was born in 1627 in Prague and studied in Toruń, later was a preacher in Leszno, received a doctoral degree from the University of Oxford and died on May 29, 1691, in Rotterdam. Not only the clergy of the community, but also its members came from distant lands, mainly from England, Scotland, Holland, and France.

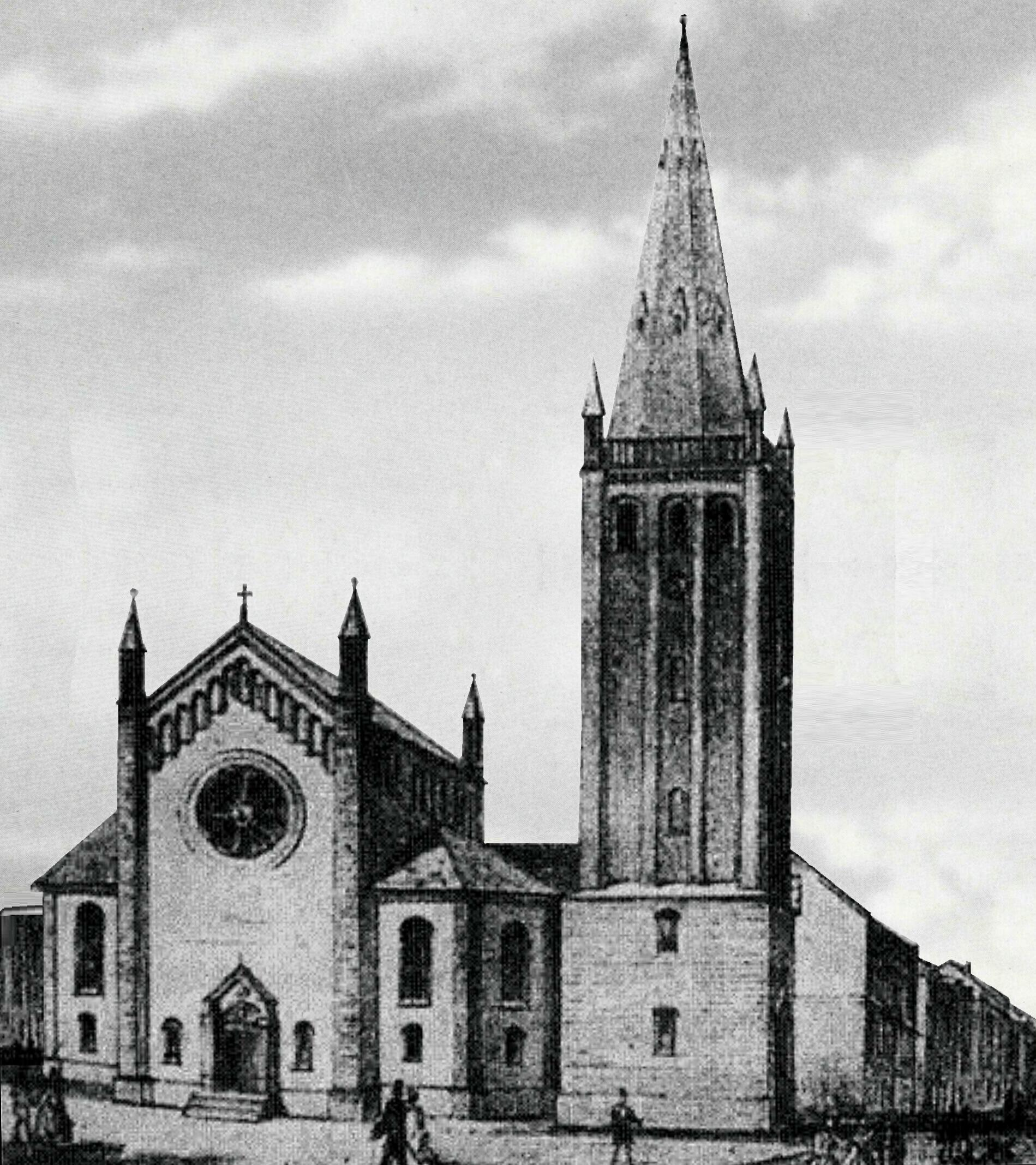
Façade of the church

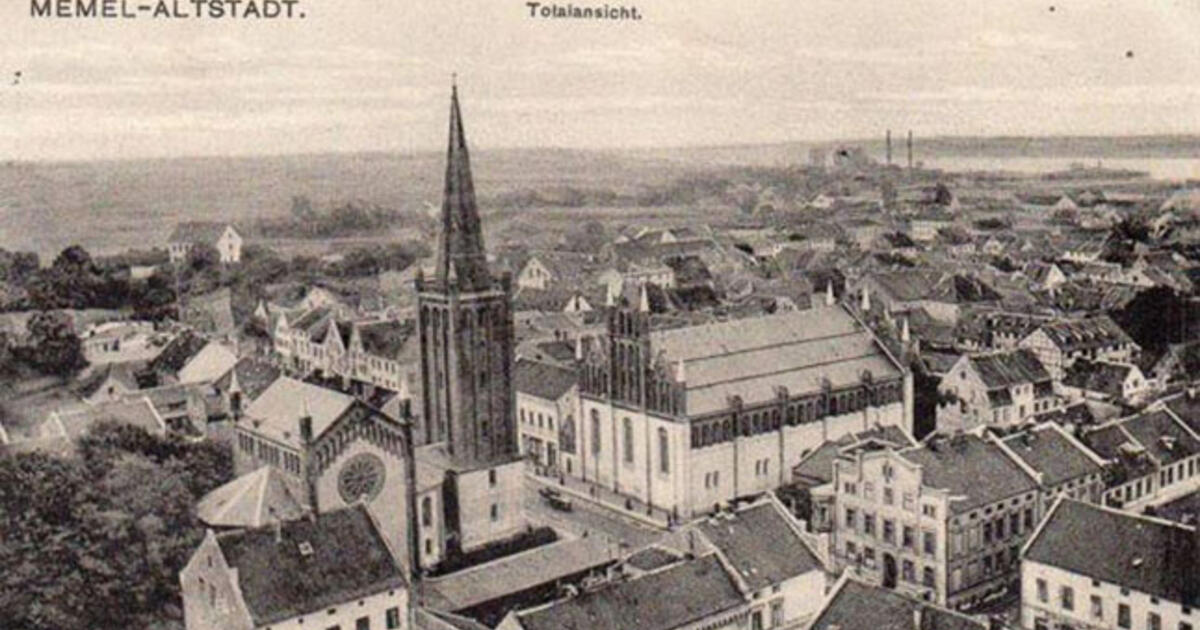
Evangelical Reformed Church (left) and Church of St. Jacob (center), 20th century

The Great Fire of Klaipėda of 1854 destroyed practically the entire central part of Klaipėda and all the churches in the Klaipėda Old Town suffered from it, including the Evangelical Reformed Church. Long-time Klaipėda historian Johannes Sembritzki notes that of all the churches being rebuilt, "the reconstruction of the Evangelical Reformed Church took the longest. Only at the beginning of 1859 did the treasury provide the estimated amount of 30,000 thalers, and construction began." The Prussian royal architect Friedrich August Stüler designed the Italian-arched prayer house, which had a bell tower on the south side, set back from the main building. It had 3 bells that rang on Sundays and during religious holidays. The tower was an important landmark for ships sailing in the Curonian Lagoon and at Baltic Sea. In the restored church the church services were held only in German language. The church was consecrated on August 25, 1861, and until then the Reformed Reformats community had been praying in the hall of the Girls' Higher School. The new preacher's house was completed on November 1, 1856.

According to the 1900 census, there were 282 people of Protestant Reformation faith (104 men, 178 women) in Klaipėda. In 1867, there were 295 people of Protestant Reformation faith in Klaipėda.

The church belonged to the Prussian Union of Churches and had the right to send its delegates to the East Prussian Synod. It did not wish to establish relations with the Reformed Churches of Lithuania proper. In 1925, the Protestant Reformation Parish consisted of 956 people.

At the end of World War II, the Reformed Church was desecrated, later set on fire, and its high tower was broken down. On the orders of the Soviet authorities, it was completely demolished.
