= Church of St. Jacob, Klaipėda =

Former Lutheran church in Lithuania

Church of St. Jacob Šv. Jokūbo bažnyčia
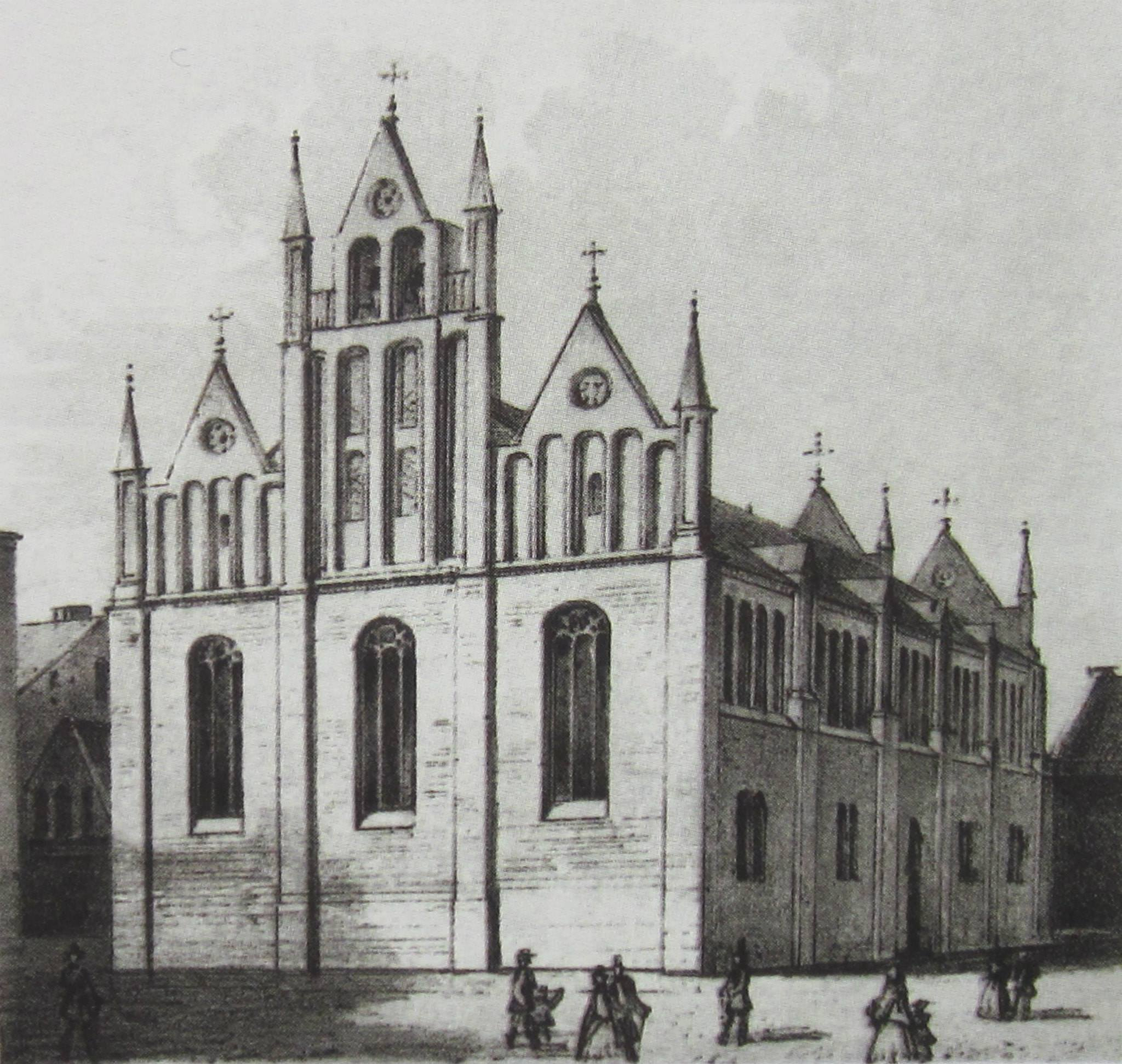
- Façade of the church in the second half of the 19th century

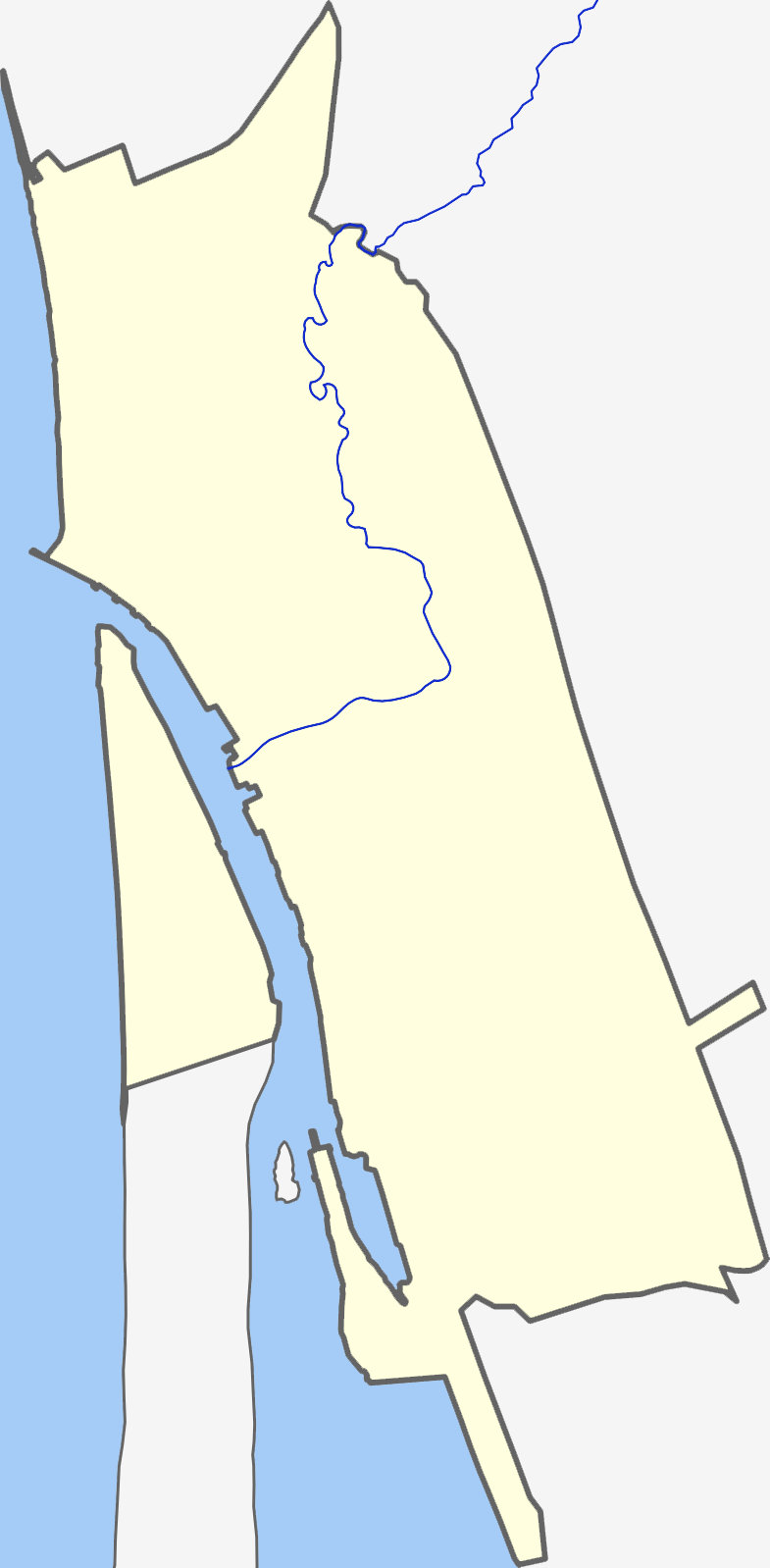
- Location within Klaipėda

Religion
- Affiliation: Lutheranism
- District: Klaipėda Old Town
- Ecclesiastical or organizational status: Demolished
- Leadership: Prussian Union of Churches (German period), Evangelical Lutheran Church in Lithuania (interwar period)
- Year consecrated: 1686 (first consecration), 1856 (latest consecration)

Location
- Location: Intersection of Tiltų gatvė (Friedrich-Wilhelm-Straße) and Bažnyčių gatvė (Kirchenstraße), Klaipėda, Lithuania
- Interactive map of Church of St. Jacob; Šv. Jokūbo bažnyčia
- Coordinates: 55°42′28″N 21°08′11″E

Architecture
- Architect: Friedrich August Stüler
- Type: Church
- Style: Gothic Revival
- Completed: 1686 (initial construction), 1856 (latest reconstruction)
- Demolished: 1959
- Materials: Brick masonry

The Church of St. Jacob (Lithuanian: Šv. Jokūbo bažnyčia; German: Jakobuskirche) or the Church of Lietuvininkai (Lithuanian: Lietuvininkų bažnyčia; German: Litauische Kirche Memel) was a Lutheran church in Klaipėda, Lithuania which was originally completed and consecrated in 1687. Following the Great Fire of Klaipėda in 1854, the last reconstruction project of the church was prepared by Friedrich August Stüler and the reconstruction works were completed in the winter of 1856.

The church was attended by the Prussian Lithuanians (Lietuvininkai) and had a long-term history of Lithuanian-speaking priests. Near the church there was a Klaipėdian Parish School dedicated for Lithuanian community.

Following World War II and incorporation of the Lithuanian SSR into the Soviet Union, the damaged church was demolished by soldiers of the Soviet Armed Forces using tanks in 1959. Despite discussions in the 1990s, the church was not rebuilt.

== History ==
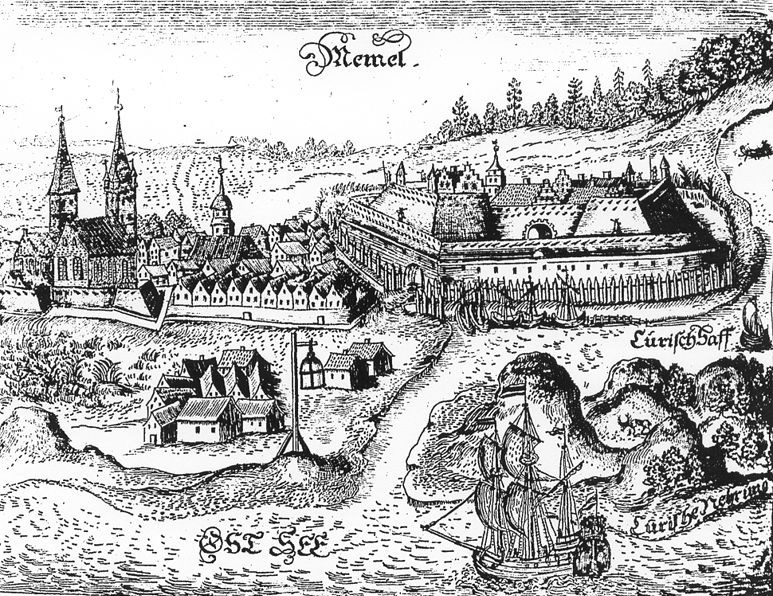
Panorama of Klaipėda before 1685 with the Church of St. John and Church of St. Nicholas (from left)

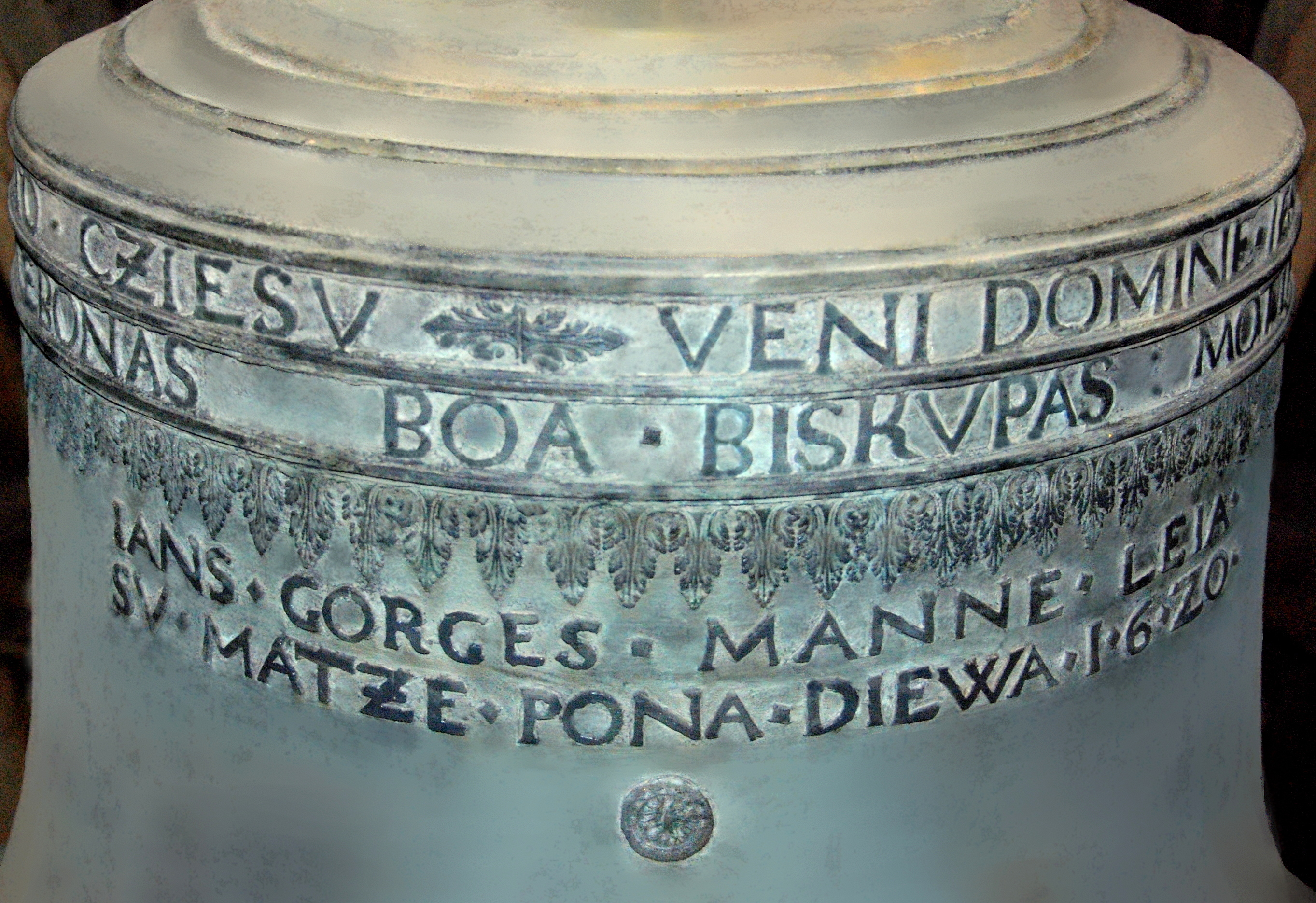
An authentic bell of the church with text in Lithuanian (cast in 1620)

Eberhard von Sayn, the Teutonic Grand Marshal, and Heinrich von Lützelburg, the Bishop of Courland, agreed in a treaty to build two churches: one for German colonists (Church of St. John), the other for baptized natives (Church of St. Nicholas). The church services were held in Latin and sermons were given in German, but there also were translators into the language of the local people who had a dedicated place near the pulpit.

Following the creation of the Duchy of Prussia in 1525 and due to the Reformation movement, the Evangelical Reformed faith was spread in the languages of the local people, including Lithuanian. In 1620, the Lithuanian Parish of Klaipėda became an independent unit, but in 1627, the Church of St. Nicholas was demolished due to the necessity to build a city wall around a growing city and the parish was left without its own church.

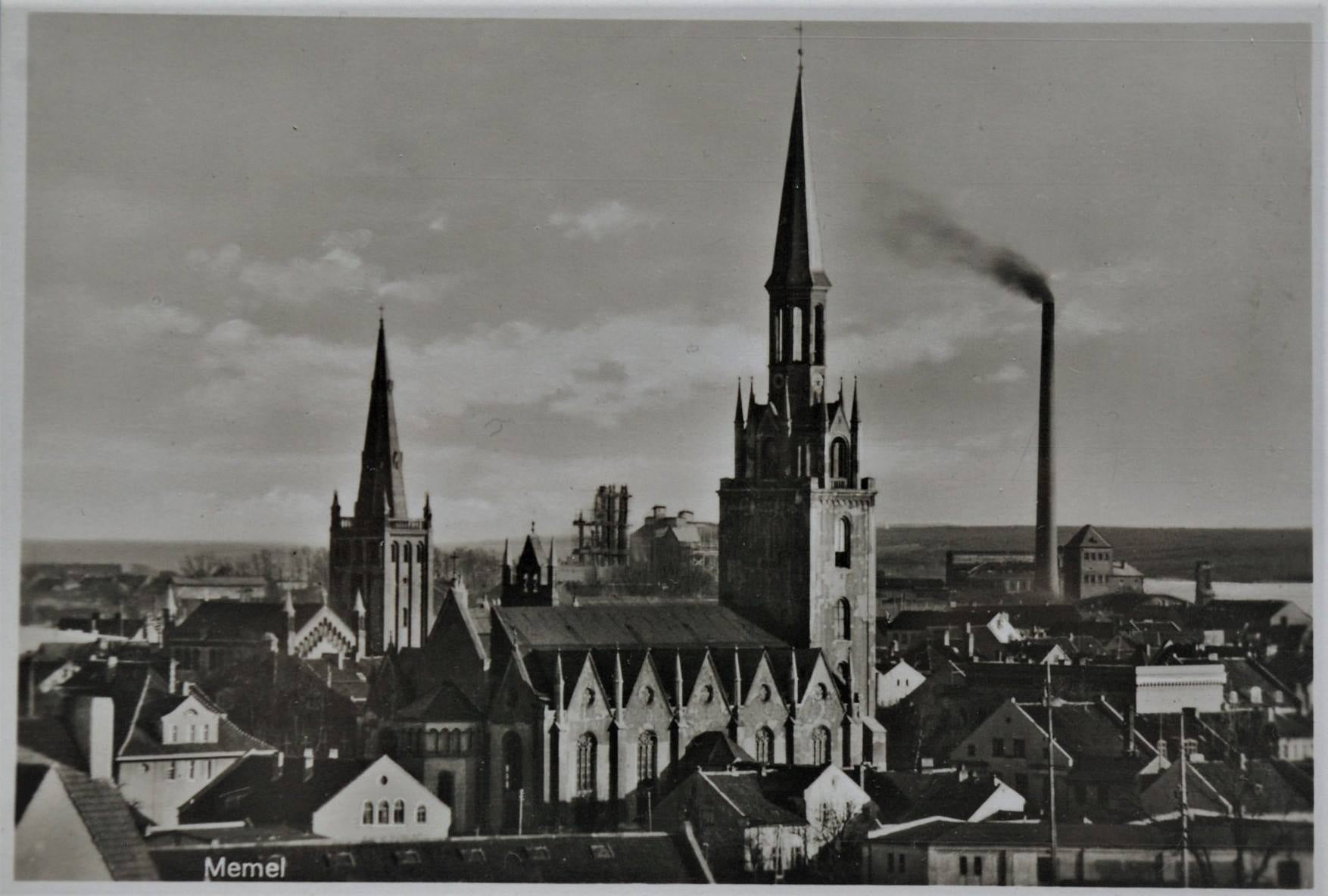
Panorama of Klaipėda with the Church of St. Jacob near the tower of the Evangelical Reformed Church and Church of St. John in the 1920s–1930s

The construction of a new church for the Lithuanian Parish began in 1686, and the new church was consecrated in the summer of 1687. Johann Lehmann worked in the new church, and by having a great knowledge of Lithuanian language he checked the Daniel Klein's Grammatica Litvanica and wrote other texts in Lithuanian. Following Lehmann's death, the parish was taken over by his son, who worked there for 32 years, and then his grandson, who worked there in 1696–1722. Later priests of the parish (e.g. Abraham David Lüneburg, Johann Richter) also knew Lithuanian and published Lithuanian texts.

The Lithuanian Church was destroyed during the Great Fire of Klaipėda in 1854. Consequently, the parishioners collected funds and the reconstruction project was prepared by architect Friedrich August Stüler which was completed in the winter of 1856. The reconstructed church exterior became more decorated as pointed Neo-Gothic style turrets were added to its façade in the Tiltų Street's side, while the interior was also significantly renewed with a new altar, pulpit, baptistery and by installing a 40-registers organ.

The Lithuanian Parish of Klaipėda was large (it had 15,600 parishioners in 1848 and 16,000 parishioners in 1878). In 1852, German services started being held in the Lithuanian Church, and since then the church was called Landkirche, but was eventually renamed to Church of St. Jacob.

Karl Rudolf Jacobi worked in the Church of St. Jacob in 1859–1881 and in 1879 was selected as Chairman of the Lithuanian Literary Society. After Jacobi's death he was replaced by Janis Pipirs who is also known for his prominent Lithuanian publications.

After the 1915 attack of Klaipėda by the Imperial Russian Army, patron cities were appointed to damaged cities of East Prussia and in Klaipėda's case it was Mannheim, which financially assisted to restore Klaipėda, including Church of St. Jacob (e.g. with Mannheim's assistance the church's organ was rebuilt and heating was installed).

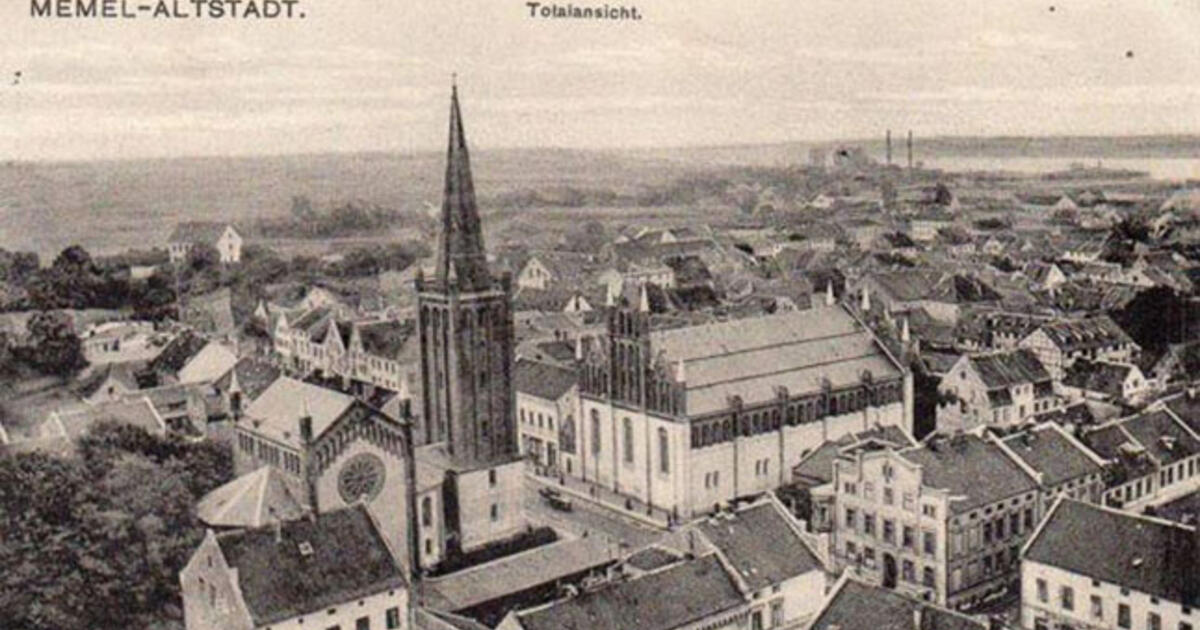
View of the Klaipėda Old Town with the Evangelical Reformed Church (left) and Church of St. Jacob (right) before World War II

Following the Klaipėda Revolt in 1923 the priests of the Church of St. Jacob stayed loyal to Lithuania and did not demonstrate support for Adolf Hitler in 1939.

In 1944 almost the entire Lutheran parish was evacuated westward to avoid Soviet repression. Following the Soviet re-occupation of Lithuania, church services were held in the church in 1945–1946, but soon the church services were prohibited by Soviet authorities and the church was used as a shooting range since 1950. Due to the forceful implementation of state atheism in the post-war period Lithuanian SSR, the damaged churches of St. Jacob, St. John, Evangelical Reformed, Anglican and Catholic Church of the Holy Trinity were completely demolished. The churches' property was nationalized by Soviet authorities.

There were discussions in the 1990s to rebuild the church instead of the shopping mall which was built in its site, but it was not realized.

An authentic bell from the church (cast in 1620) with a text in Lithuanian "IANS GORGES MANNE LEIA SU MATZE PONA DIEWA 1620" has survived and is currently located in the Church of St. George in Pašilė.
