= Church of St. George, Pašilė =

Roman Catholic church in Pašilė, Lithuania

Church of St. George Šv. Jurgio bažnyčia
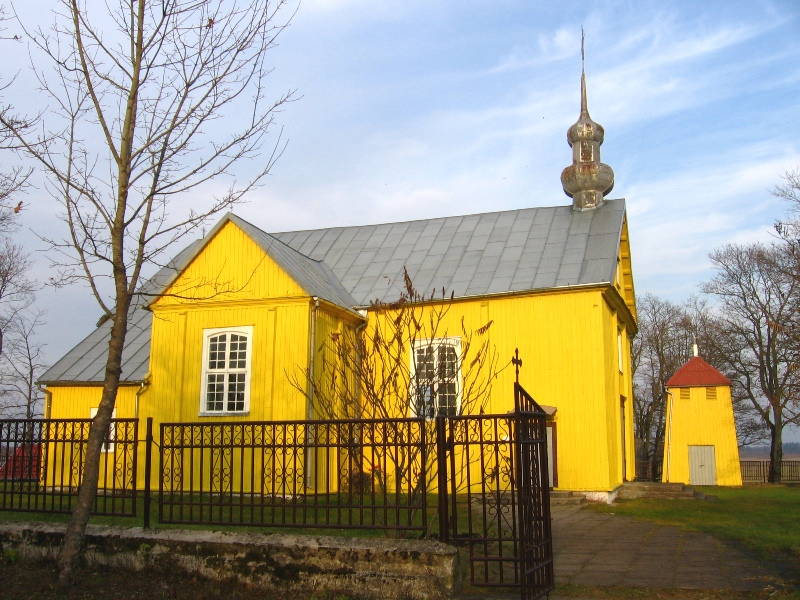
- Façade of the church and belfry in 2011

Religion
- Affiliation: Roman Catholic
- Diocese: Deanery of Kelmė
- Ecclesiastical or organizational status: Used as a church
- Leadership: Roman Catholic Diocese of Šiauliai

Location
- Location: Pašilė, Lithuania
- Interactive map of Church of St. George; Šv. Jurgio bažnyčia
- Coordinates: 55°36′48.96″N 22°32′12.12″E

Architecture
- Type: Church
- Style: Vernacular architecture
- Completed: 1883
- Materials: Wood, metal

The Church of St. George (Lithuanian: Šv. Jurgio bažnyčia) is a Roman Catholic church in Pašilė, Lithuania, which was completed in 1883. Nearby the church is a belfry which was built in the 19th century. The first church was completed in 1781 and close to the current church is a column shrine dedicated to its 200th anniversary (1981).

== Gallery ==
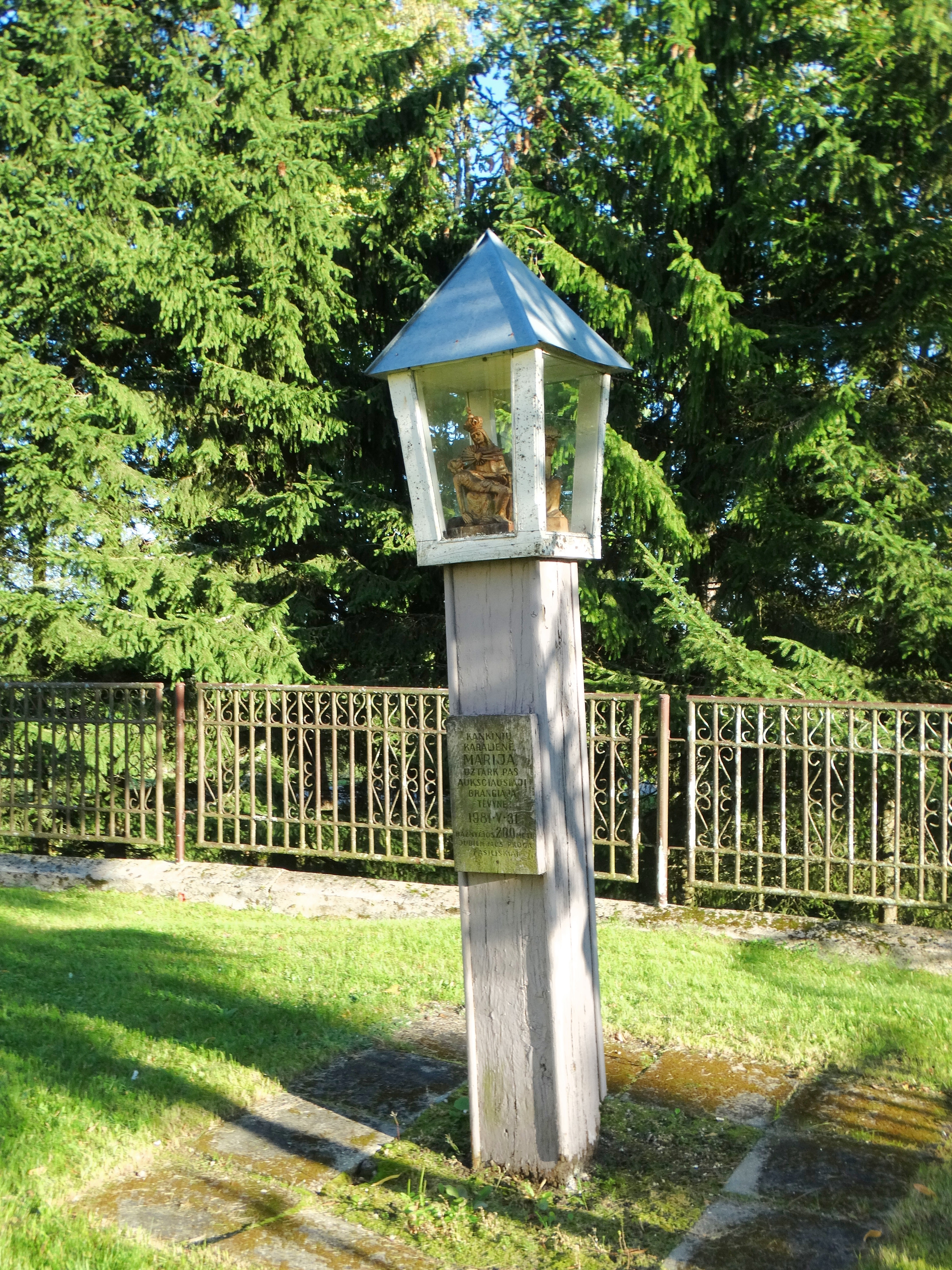
Column shrine dedicated to the 200th anniversary of the first church (1981)

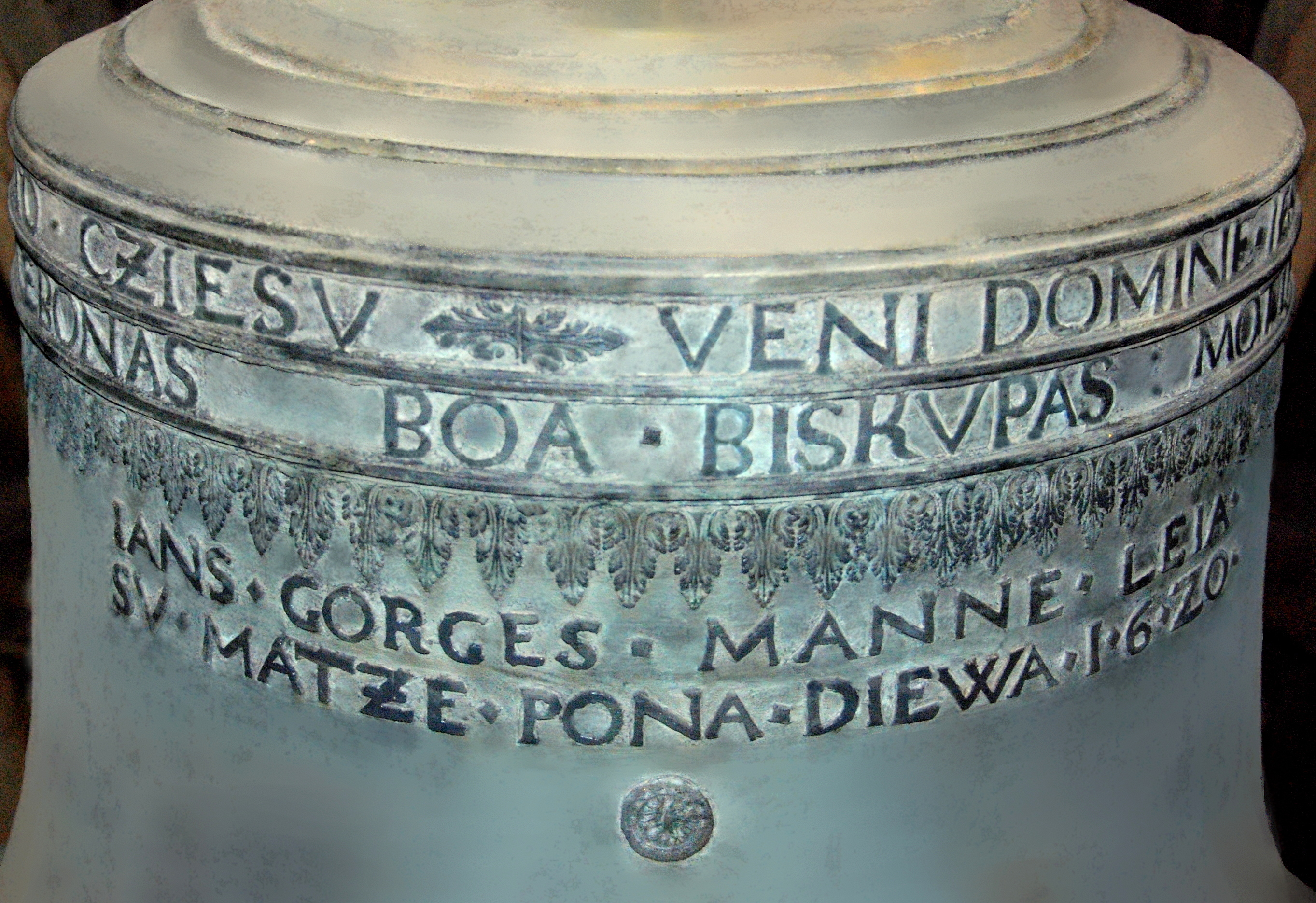
Bell which was cast in 1620 and was previously used in Church of St. Jacob, Klaipėda

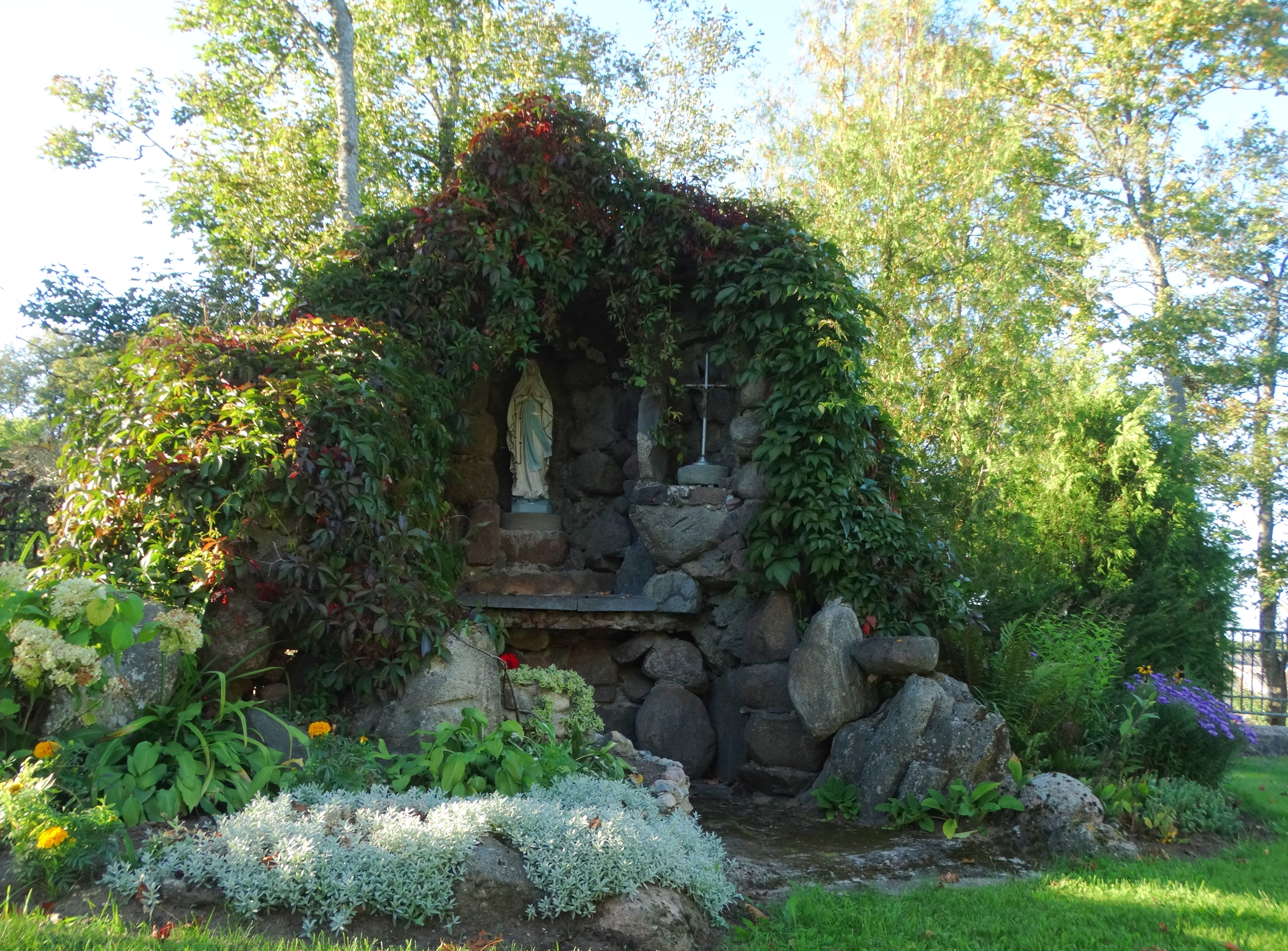
Lourdes grotto
