= Church of St. John, Klaipėda =

Evangelical Lutheran church in Klaipėda, Lithuania

Church of St. John Šv. Jono bažnyčia
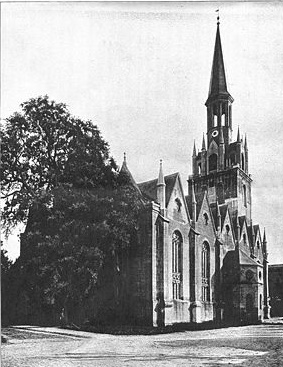
- Façade of the church before 1900

Religion
- Affiliation: Lutheranism
- District: Klaipėda Old Town
- Ecclesiastical or organizational status: Ruins of foundations
- Leadership: Prussian Union of Churches (historically), Evangelical Lutheran Church in Lithuania (now)
- Year consecrated: 1857

Location
- Location: Klaipėda, Lithuania
- Interactive map of Church of St. John; Šv. Jono bažnyčia
- Coordinates: 55°42′34.1″N 21°8′11.75″E

Architecture
- Architect: Friedrich August Stüler
- Type: Church
- Style: Gothic Revival
- Completed: 1258 (first constructed), 1858 (last reconstruction before demolition)
- Demolished: 1945

Specifications
- Spire: 1
- Spire height: 75 metres
- Materials: Brick masonry

Website
- SvJono.lt

The Church of St. John (Lithuanian: Šv. Jono bažnyčia; German: St. Johanniskirche) was a Lutheran church in Klaipėda, Lithuania. The last major reconstruction of the church was executed in 1856–1858. Following the reconstruction, its 75 metres tower with a clock and observation deck dominated the panorama of Klaipėda. During World War II the church was damaged and because of introduction of state atheism it was completely demolished in 1945.

It is planned to rebuild the church as it looked like in 1856–1858 according to blueprints which were found in Germany. The Seimas recognized the reconstruction of the church as of state-level importance.

== Gallery ==
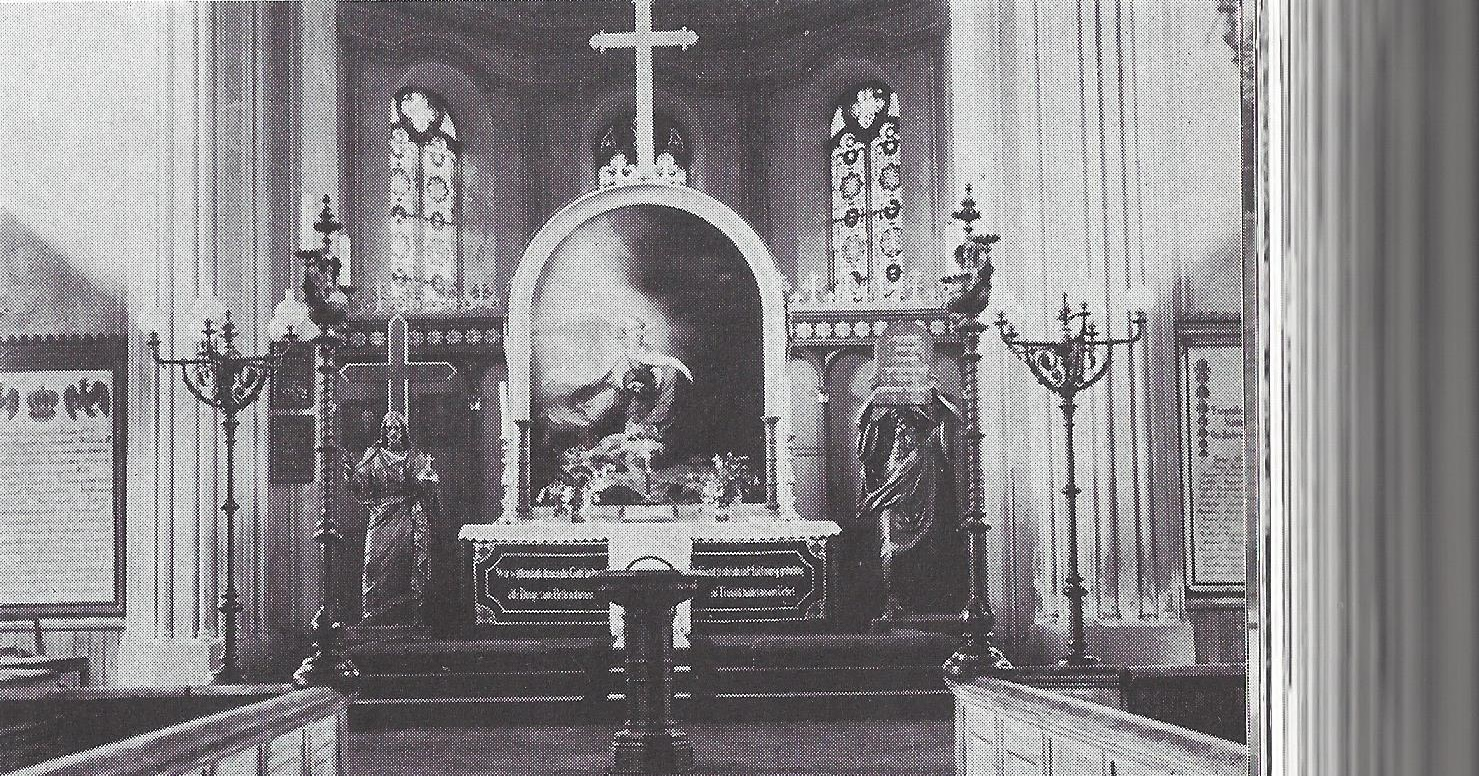
Main altar of the church in the 1930s

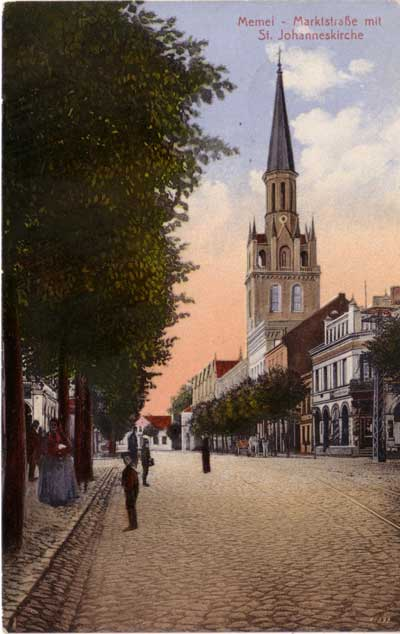
Street-view of Klaipėda with the church in the early 20th century

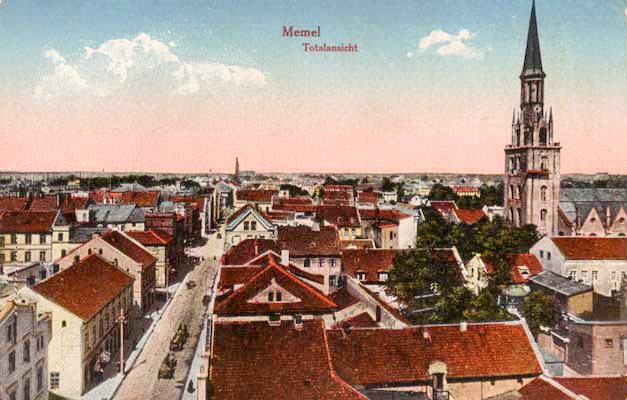
Panorama of Klaipėda in the early 20th century

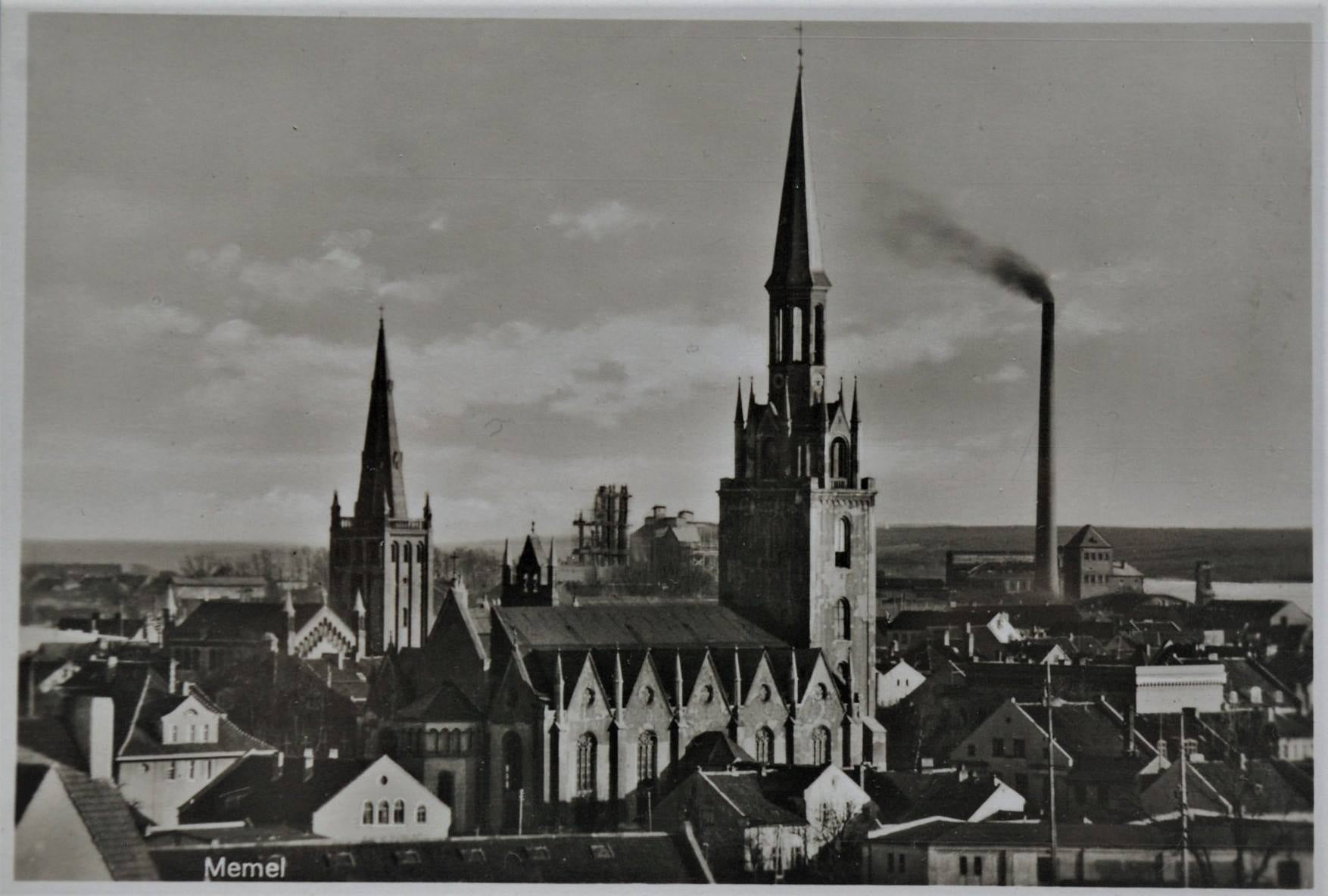
View of Klaipėda before World War II

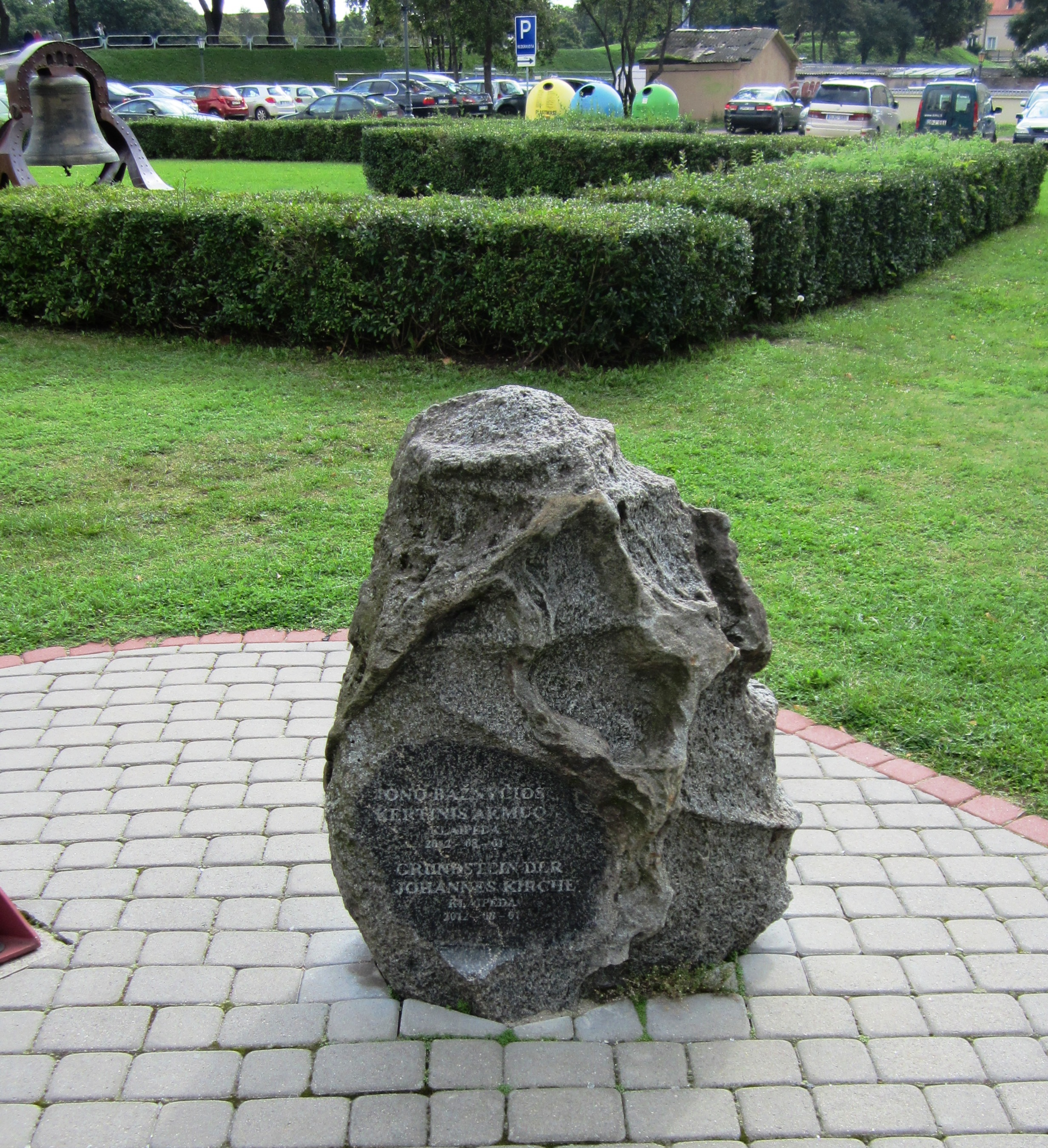
Monument to the church

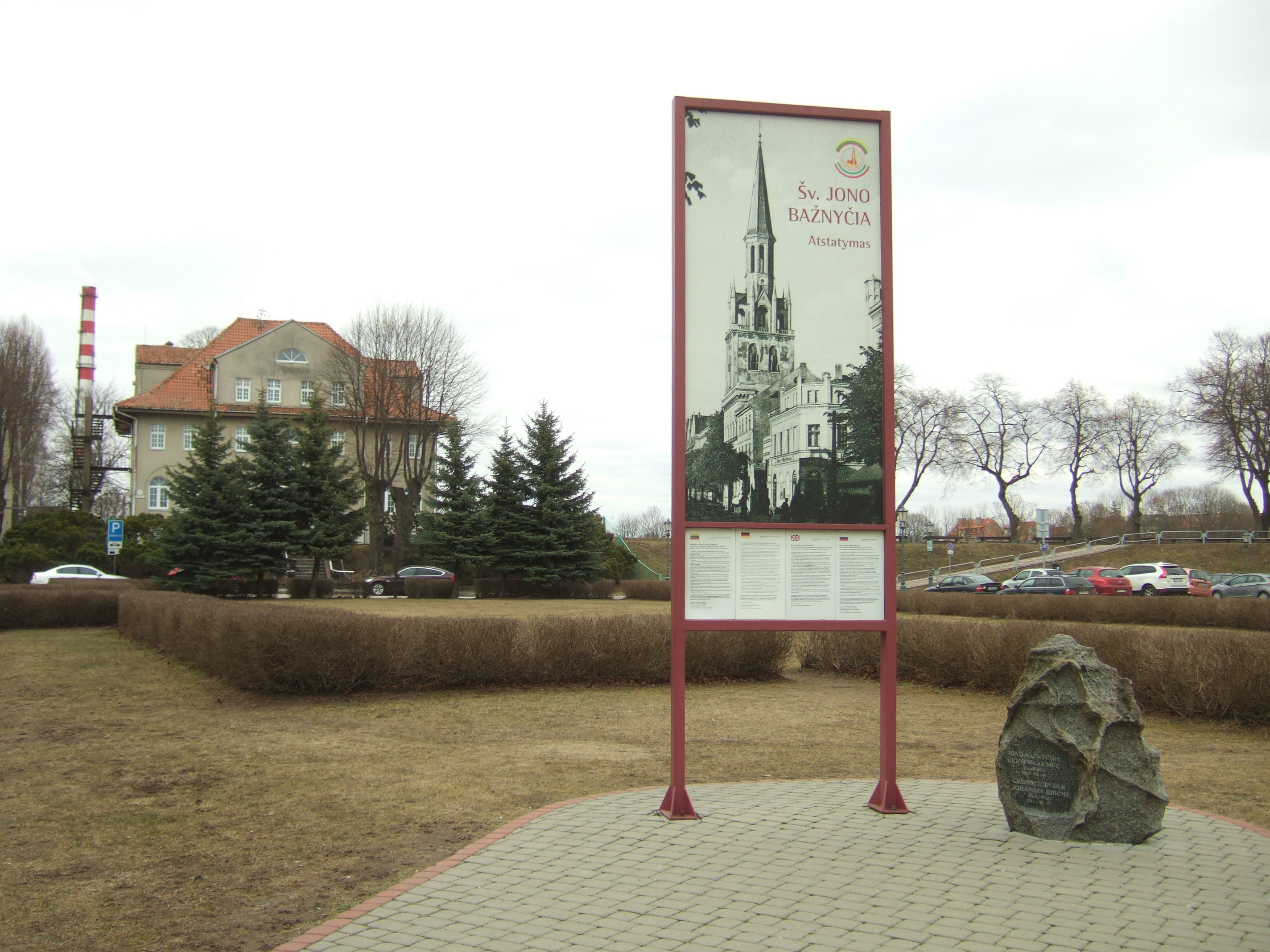
Site of the church in 2016
