= Pašilė =

- Town
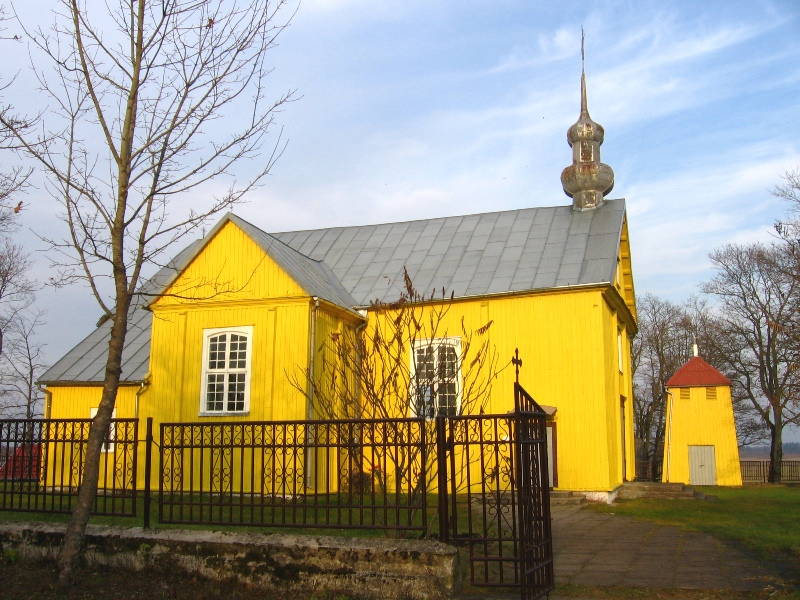
- Church of St. George

- Location of Pašilė
- Coordinates: 55°36′30″N 22°32′10″E
- Country: Lithuania
- Ethnographic region: Samogitia
- County: Šiauliai County
- Municipality: Kelmė district municipality
- Eldership: Kražiai eldership

Population (2011)
  - Total: 160
- Time zone: UTC+2 (EET)
  - Summer (DST): UTC+3 (EEST)

Pašilė is a small town in Lithuania. The population in the 2011 census was 160.
