= Walerian Protasewicz =

Ruthenian Roman Catholic bishop (c. 1505–1579)

- Bishop of Vilnius
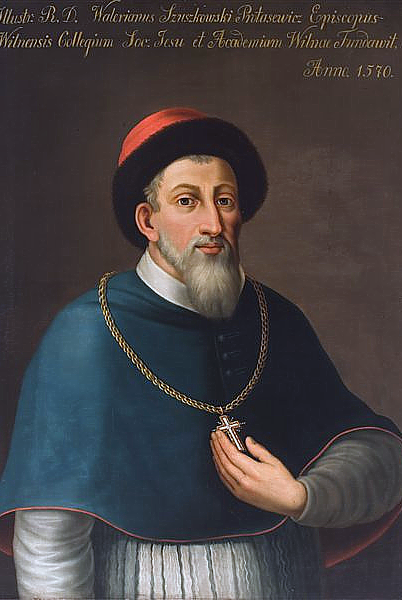
- Church: Roman Catholic Church
- Diocese: Diocese of Vilnius
- Installed: 10 April 1556
- Term ended: 31 December 1579
- Predecessor: Paweł Holszański
- Successor: Jerzy Radziwiłł
- Other post: Bishop of Lutsk (1549–1556)

Personal details
- Born: c. 1505 Shushkova, Grand Duchy of Lithuania
- Died: 31 December 1579 Vilnius, Grand Duchy of Lithuania
- Buried: Vilnius Cathedral
- Denomination: Roman Catholic

Walerian Protasewicz (also: Protaszewicz-Szuszkowski, Lithuanian: Valerijonas Protasevičius; c. 1505 – 31 December 1579 in Vilnius) was bishop of Lutsk (1549–1555) and Vilnius (1555–1579). Born to a family of petty Ruthenian nobles (szlachta), Protasewicz worked as a scribe, notary, and secretary at the chancellery of the Grand Duchy of Lithuania until his appointment of bishop. He was politically active and was one of the lead Lithuanian negotiators for the Union of Lublin in 1569. He neglected religious matters and allowed the Reformation to spread. In the last decade of his life, he invited the Jesuits to the Grand Duchy of Lithuania and funded the Jesuit college in Vilnius. He obtained papal and royal privileges to convert the college into Vilnius University in 1579. He donated his personal library to what became the Vilnius University Library. The university soon became a spiritual and cultural center of the Grand Duchy of Lithuania as well as the major center of the Counter-Reformation.

== Early life ==
Protasewicz was born in a family of Ruthenian nobles (szlachta) in a small village of Shushkova (Belarusian: Шушкова, Polish: Szuszkow) near Kraysk in the Minsk Voivodeship of the Grand Duchy of Lithuania. His family used the Drzewica coat of arms. It is unknown where he received his education or when he was ordained as a priest. He was friends with Stanislovas Kęsgaila, Elder of Samogitia. Perhaps through this connection, Protasewicz obtained a position at the chancellery of the Grand Duchy of Lithuania. There he worked as a scribe, notary, and secretary until 1549. From 1532 to 1544, he headed the chancellery of Queen Bona Sforza. With her support, Protasewicz received the benefice of Maišiagala in 1533.

In 1533, Protasewicz was appointed by Kęsgaila as pastor of Kražiai. Soon he was promoted by Mikalojus Viežgaila, Bishop of Samogitia, to canon of Varniai. He joined the Vilnius cathedral chapter first as a member (since 1537) and later as a dean (1547–1549). In 1546, he was mentioned as parson of Pasvalys.

== Bishop ==
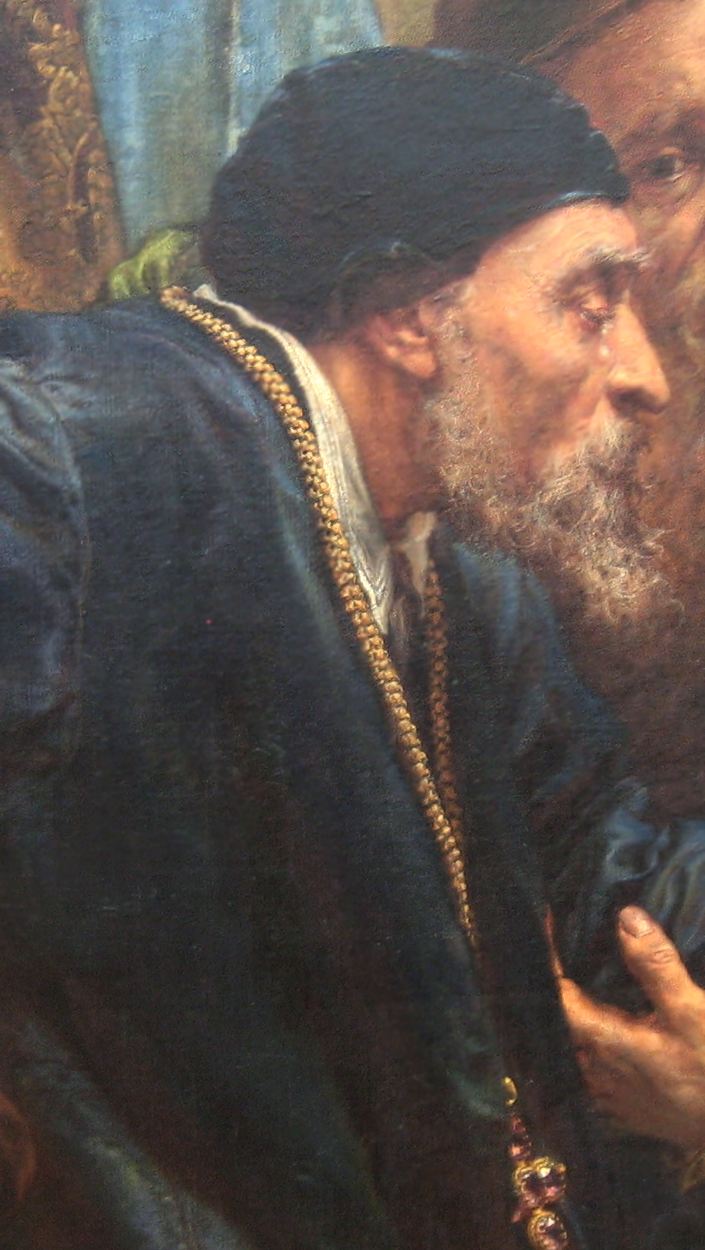
Protasewicz in Jan Matejko's painting of the Union of Lublin

Protasewicz was appointed as bishop of Lutsk by Pope Paul III on 27 May 1549 and as bishop of Vilnius by Pope Paul IV on 10 April 1556. At first, he was more interested in political affairs, participating in the Seimas and advising the Grand Duke. Generally, Protasewicz supported judicial independence of the Grand Duchy of Lithuania and opposed a closer union between Poland and Lithuania. In 1568, Protasewicz joined a commission preparing the third Statute of Lithuania and headed it until his death. He was a leading member of the Lithuanian delegations sent to the Polish Great Sejm to negotiate the Union of Lublin.

In 1554, Protasewicz excommunicated the first clergymen who converted to Protestantism but was overall passive and indecisive when it came to combating the Reformation. He was criticized by his contemporaries, including Augustinus Rotundus and Stanislaus Hosius, for neglecting religious matters and allowing the Reformation to spread. Protasewicz soon began to combat the Protestantism by calling two diocesan synods, disciplining priests, and improving the Cathedral School of Vilnius. He constructed churches in Šešuoliai and Kiaukliai. In 1573, Protasewicz reburied remains of Grand Duke Vytautas (died in 1430) by the altar of the Holy Cross in Vilnius Cathedral and built a tomb sponsored by Queen Bona Sforza. His most important contribution to the Counter-Reformation was the establishment of Vilnius Academy in 1570. He obtained privileges to convert the academy into a university in 1579. Protasewicz also laid the groundwork for the Vilnius Theological Seminary, established in 1582.

In 1574, after death of Samogitian bishop Jurgis Petkūnas, Archbishop of Gniezno Jakub Uchański attempted to promote his nephew. Protasewicz protested such nepotism and instead managed to persuade the Pope to install Merkelis Giedraitis. At the same time he selected Paweł Holszański as his successor and appointed him as coadjutor bishop. Protasewicz died in 1579 and was buried at Vilnius Cathedral.

== Vilnius Academy ==
Already in 1553, the Jesuits offered to establish a college in Vilnius, but Grand Duke Sigismund II Augustus delayed due to the Livonian War, opposition of some Protestant nobles, and difficulties in finding the right personnel. With assistance from papal nuncio Giovanni Francesco Commendone and Bishop of Warmia Stanislaus Hosius, Protasewicz persuaded Sigismund to allow the school to be established. The priests were afraid that Protestants might be first to establish an academy, as such a Protestant school was contemplated by Mikołaj "the Red" Radziwiłł based on the last will of Mikołaj "the Black" Radziwiłł. The Jesuits hoped that the new school would become their stronghold, preparing new generations of Catholic-educated activists for future religious work. The academy was intended to stop emigration of Lithuanian students to various Protestant German universities, including the newly established University of Königsberg. Possibly, there were also political motives: Lithuania needed a university as a counterpart to the Polish university in Kraków.

Protasewicz was instrumental in providing financial support to the school. He bought, renovated, and expanded a palace for the academy and a dormitory for students. He also gifted his own personal library to what became Vilnius University Library. The education was free; thus the new academy needed an endowment to provide funding. To that end, Protasewicz bequeathed several manors and villages near Varniai, Trakai, Maišiagala, Širvintos, and Lida. The first four Jesuit teachers arrived from Olomouc in 1569 and the first lessons took place in May 1570. The official opening was celebrated on 17 July, which was officially marked in honor of Protasewicz annually for about 200 years. The new school year in October 1570 began with 122–160 students based on the classical curriculum of trivium and quadrivium. The number of staff and students grew – by 1572 there were Jesuit staff from 15 different European countries and 200 students. The academy was established with intentions to convert it into a university. Protasewicz petitioned Pope Gregory XIII and Grand Duke Stephen Báthory to grant university privileges (i.e. the ability to confer universally accepted degrees) to the academy. Royal privilege was issued in July 1578 and approved by the Pope in October 1579. The university was granted autonomy and exempted from taxes, but also prohibited from offering courses in medicine or law and thus competing with the Jagiellonian University in Kraków.

== Bibliography ==
- Gudavičius, Edvardas (1994). "Universiteto įkūrimas". Vilniaus universiteto istorija 1579–1994 (in Lithuanian). Vilnius: Valstybinis leidybos centras. ISBN 9986-09-047-4.
- Gudavičius, Edvardas (2005). История Литвы (PDF) (in Russian). Vol. 1: с древнейших времен до 1569 года. Moscow: Фонд им. И. Д. Сытина; Baltrus. ISBN 5-94953-029-2.
- Jovaiša, Liudas (27 March 2019). "Valerijonas Protasevičius". Visuotinė lietuvių enciklopedija (in Lithuanian). Mokslo ir enciklopedijų leidybos centras.
- Krasauskas, Rapolas (1975). "Protasewicz, Valerian". In Sužiedėlis, Simas (ed.). Encyclopedia Lituanica. Vol. IV. Boston, Massachusetts: Juozas Kapočius. LCCN 74-114275.
- Petkus, Viktoras (2002). Vilniaus vyskupai Lietuvos istorijoje (in Lithuanian). Vilnius: Petro ofsetas. ISBN 9955-534-02-8.
- Rabikauskas, Paulius (Summer 1981). "The Academy of Vilnius as a Lithuanian Institution". Lituanus. 1 (27). ISSN 0024-5089. Archived from the original on 2019-08-04.
- Rabikauskas, Paulius (2002). Vilniaus akademija ir Lietuvos jėzuitai (in Lithuanian). Vilnius: Aidai. ISBN 9955-445-39-4.
- Venclova, Tomas (Summer 1981). "A Historic View of the University of Vilnius, 1579-1979". Lituanus. 1 (27). ISSN 0024-5089. Archived from the original on 2021-06-23.
- Zinkus, Jonas; et al., eds. (1987). "Protasevičius, Valerijonas". Tarybų Lietuvos enciklopedija (in Lithuanian). Vol. 3. Vilnius, Lithuania: Vyriausioji enciklopedijų redakcija. LCCN 86232954.

Catholic Church titles
Preceded by Jerzy Chwalczewski	Bishop of Lutsk; 1549–1556	Succeeded by Jan Andruszewicz
Preceded by Paweł Holszański	Bishop of Vilnius; 1556–1579	Succeeded by Jerzy Radziwiłł
