= Petkevičius =

Petkevičius is a Lithuanian male surname. Its feminine forms are: Petkevičienė (married woman or widow) and Petkevičiūtė (unmarried woman).

Notable persons with that name include:

- Juozas Petkevičius (born 1948), Lithuanian basketball coach, masseur, and former rugby player
- Jurgis Petkūnas or Petkevičius (died in 1574), Bishop of Samogitia from 1567 to 1574
- Kazys Petkevičius (1926–2008), Lithuanian basketball player
- Merkelis Petkevičius (c. 1550–1608), a Reformation (Calvinist) activist in the Grand Duchy of Lithuania

== See also ==
- Petkevich (Belarusian)
