= Samogitian Diocese Museum =

Museum in Varniai, Lithuania

- Žemaičių vyskupystės muziejus
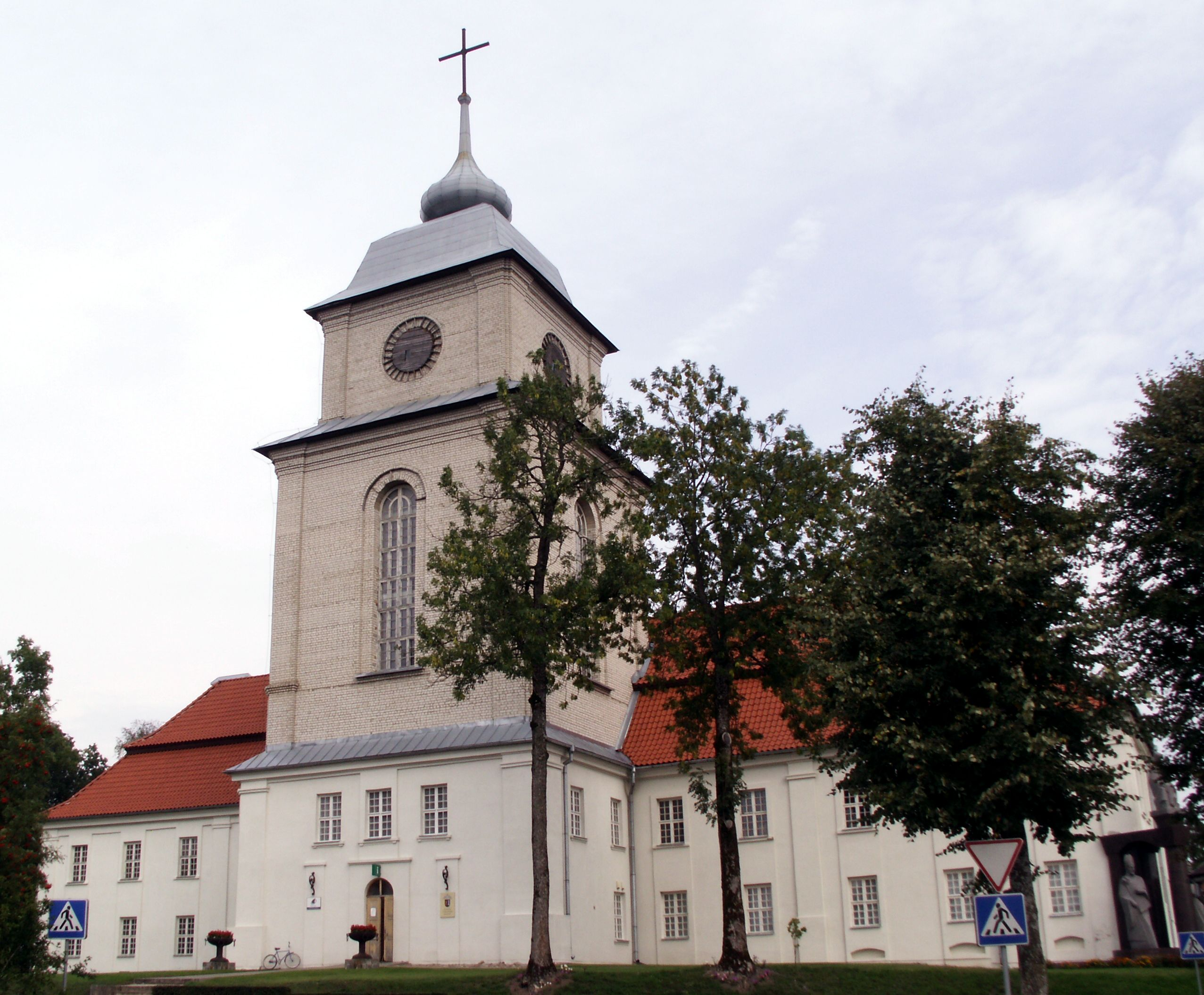
- Main building of the museum
- Established: 1999
- Location: Varniai, Lithuania
- Coordinates: 55°44′39″N 22°22′20″E
- Website: muziejusalka.lt

The Samogitian Diocese Museum (Lithuanian: Žemaičių vyskupystės muziejus) is a museum dedicated to the former Diocese of Samogitia (reorganized into the Diocese of Telšiai in 1926). Established in 1999, the museum is located in the building of the former Varniai Priest Seminary which was relocated to Kaunas after the failed Uprising of 1863. The museum is a branch of the Samogitian Museum Alka based in Telšiai.

== History ==
The Diocese of Samogitia was established when Samogitia officially converted to Catholicism in 1417. The seat of the diocese was in Varniai sometimes also known as Medininkai. The Varniai Priest Seminary was established only in 1623 by Bishop Stanisław Kiszka. Until 1743, the seminary shared premises with the Kražiai College. In 1770, a new brick building in the late Baroque style was built by Bishop Jan Dominik Łopaciński. Motiejus Valančius, future bishop, began his studies at the seminary in 1822. From 1845 to 1850, he was the seminary's rector. When he became the bishop, Valančius organized a teetotalism movement, spent considerable effort on educating children and adults, and organised the smuggling and distribution of the banned Lithuanian books. Valančius lived in a wooden building next to the seminary and planted an avenue of poplar trees and established a garden with about twenty different species of fruit trees.

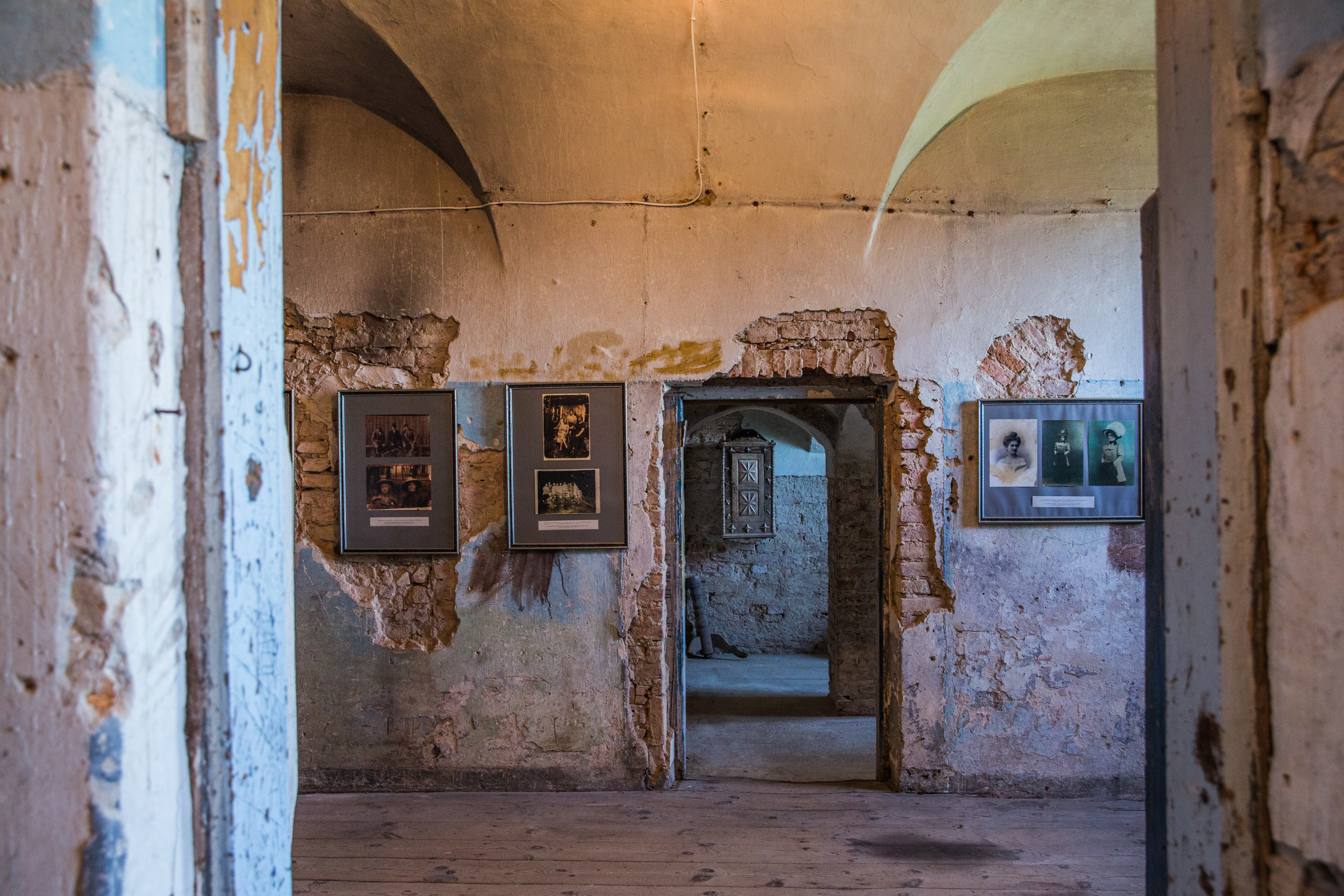
Museum interior

After the failed anti-Tsarist Uprising of 1863, Tsarist authorities relocated the seminary to Kaunas. The former seminary building in Varniai was used as military barracks. In 1927–1931, the building housed the Varniai concentration camp. The new regime of President Antanas Smetona used the camp to house political prisoners, mainly members of the outlawed Communist Party of Lithuania. The building housed a secondary school in 1947–1961, and student dormitory and storage of a technical school in 1964–1984.

Historical, archaeological, architectural studies of the building were carried out in 1984–1990. The bell tower (burned down in 1785) and the original Baroque roof were reconstructed in 1991–1995 based on the original building depicted in a portrait of Jan Dominik Łopaciński. In 1999, the government of Lithuania and the Diocese of Telšiai established the Samogitian Diocese Museum. Over the years, the building suffered heavy damage and neglect, and requires extensive repairs. On 1 July 2015, the Samogitian Diocese Museum became a branch of the Samogitian Museum Alka based in Telšiai.

== Museum ==
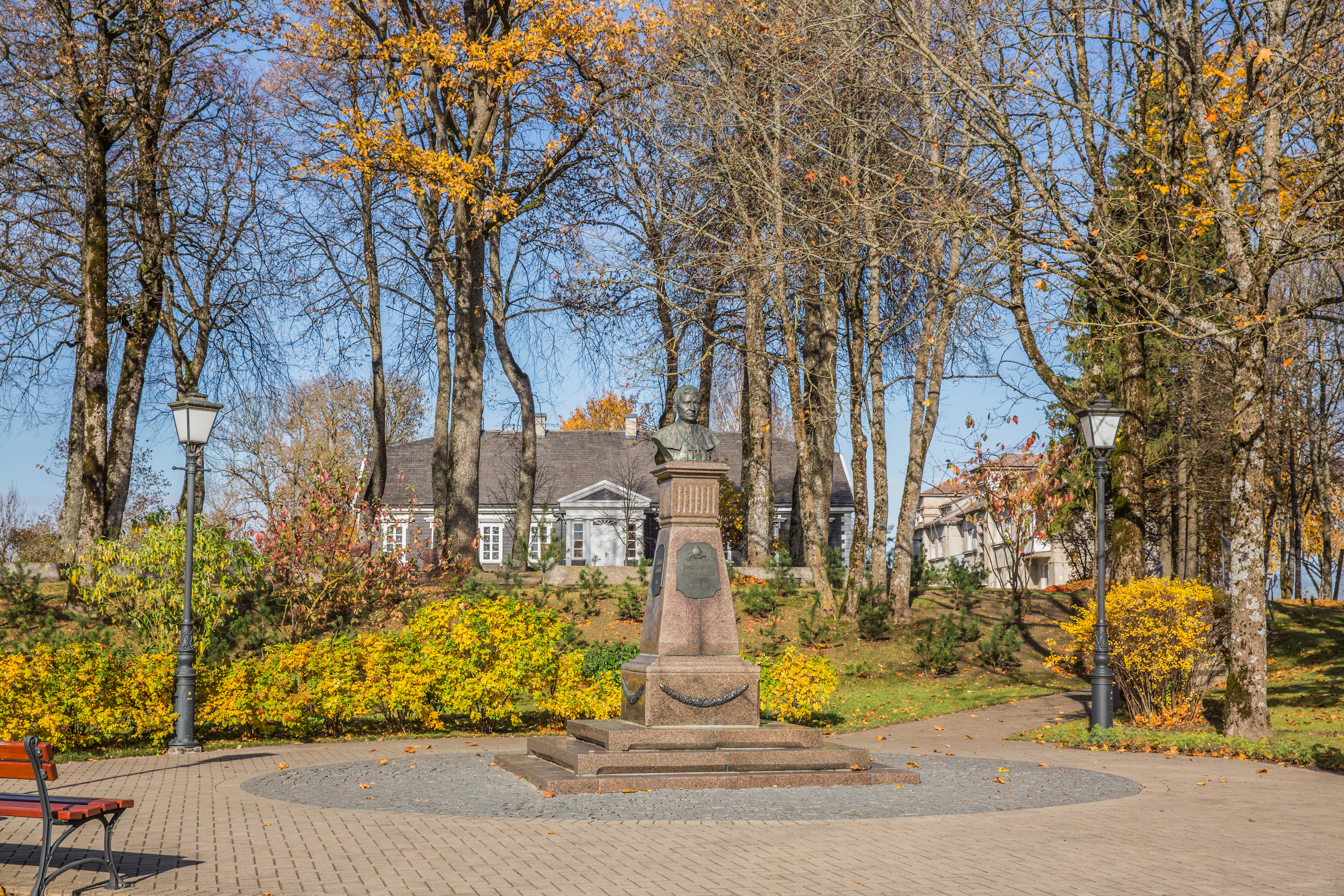
Garden of Motiejus Valančius

The garden that was planted by Valančius is now known as Valančius garden and has a monument with his bust (sculptor Antanas Aleksandravičius, erected in 1927). The bust was removed by the authorities of the Lithuanian SSR in 1951. A local man hid the bust and it was reinstalled in its original location in 1990. In 1999, the year the museum opened and the 400th anniversary of the publication of the Postil of Mikalojus Daukša, a monument to Bishop Merkelis Giedraitis and Mikalojus Daukša was unveiled next to the museum.

The museum collect various objects related to history, art, and religion in Samogitia. Its collections include archaeological artifacts found during excavations in Varniai, physharmonica and church organ (built in 1909), various liturgical and religious objects (sculptures, crosses, banners, icons, paintings, vestments), 5,557 religious postcards and medals donated by Algimantas Urbonas, various records and documents from local parishes, etc. In 2005, the museum acquired 290 items that were hidden in 1944 at the Biržuvėnai Manor. The manor owners retreated from the approaching Red Army to France and their descendant returned to the manor to find the hoard. The items include sets of Meissen and Rosenthal porcelain dishes and two early 19th-century pistols. Another cache of documents and four family photo albums was found at Biržuvėnai after a fire in December 2004; the photo albums were acquired by the museum.

The museum organizes excursions, art and history exhibitions, lectures, and other events.

== Gallery ==
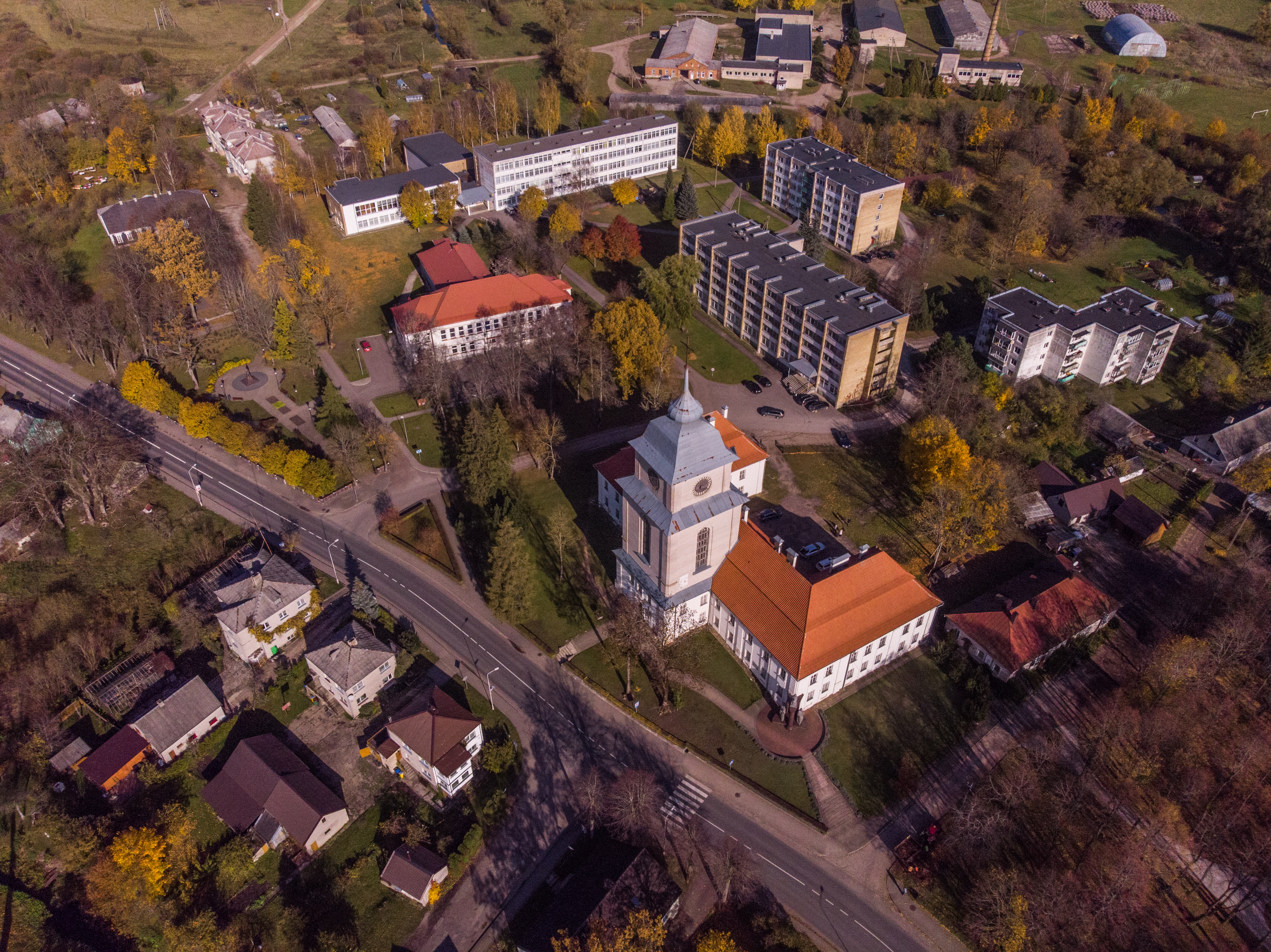
Aerial view of the museum

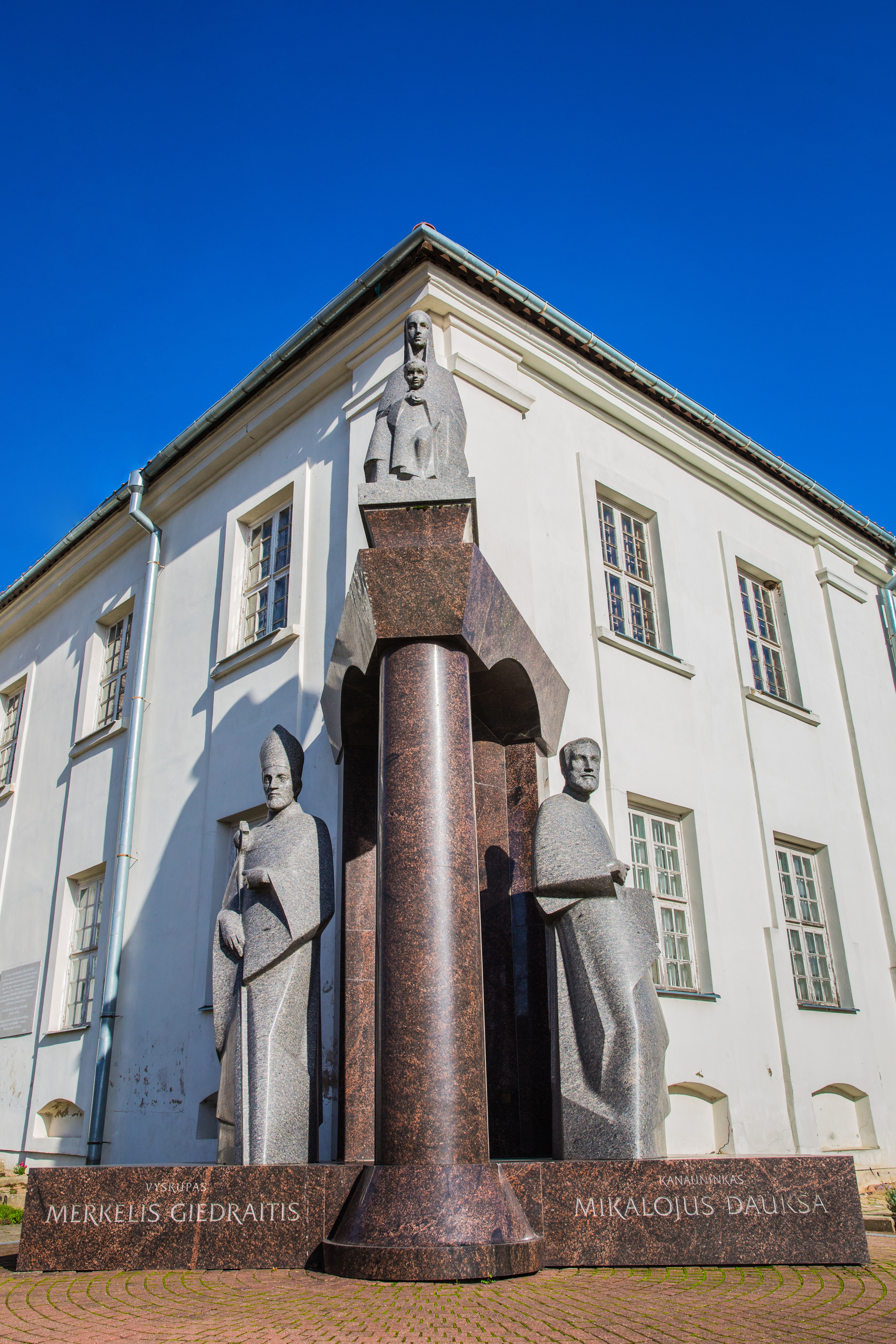
Monument to Bishop Merkelis Giedraitis and priest Mikalojus Daukša

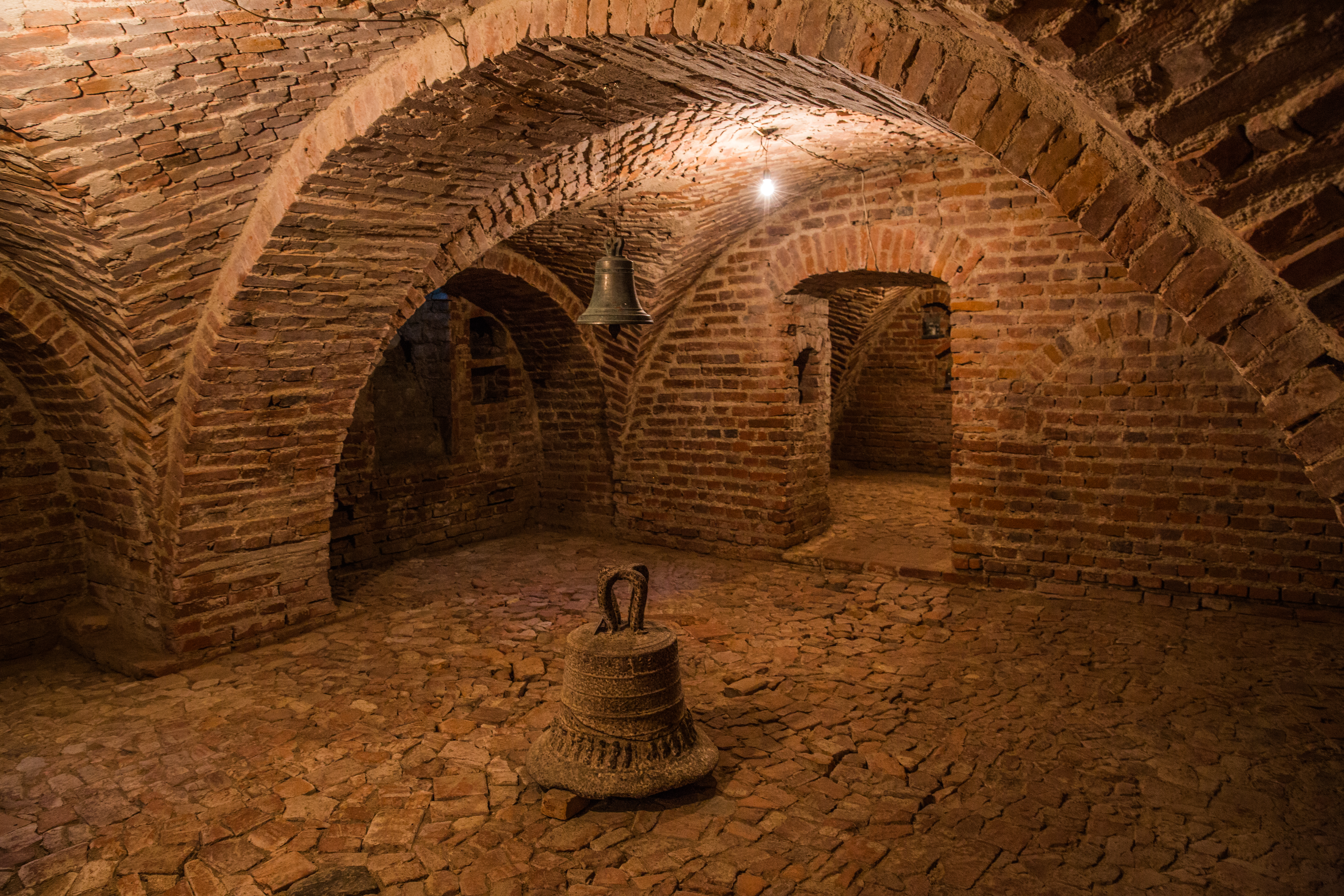
Crypt in the museum
