= Petkēvičs =

Petkēvičs is a Latvian surname, from Slavic Petkevich/Pietkiewicz. Notable people with the surname include:

- Juzefs Petkēvičs (1940–2024), Latvian chess Grandmaster
- Staņislavs Petkēvičs (1908–1960), Latvian-Polish long-distance runner
