= Merkelis Giedraitis =

Lithuanian bishop

- Bishop of Samogitia
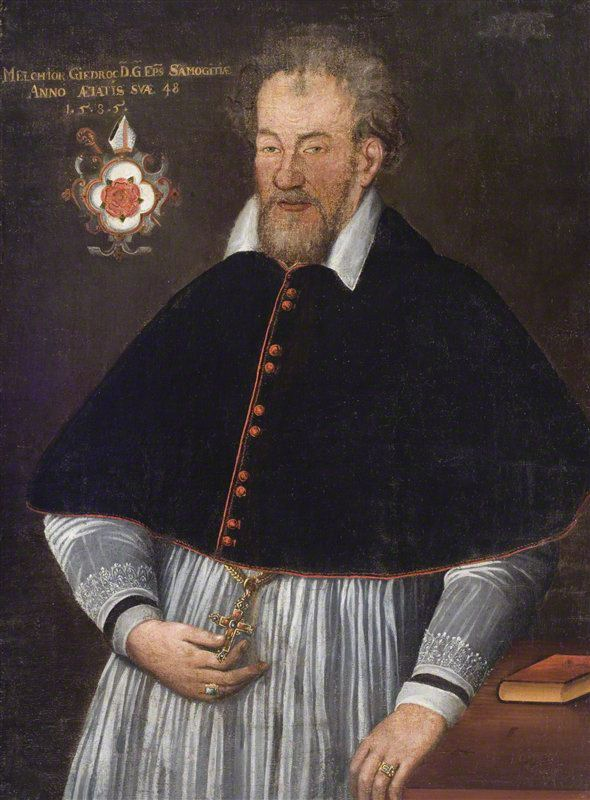
- Portrait of Giedraitis from 1585
- Church: Roman Catholic Church
- Diocese: Diocese of Samogitia
- Installed: 16 January 1576
- Term ended: 6 April 1609
- Predecessor: Jurgis Petkūnas
- Successor: Mikołaj Pac

Orders
- Ordination: 1571
- Consecration: Easter 1576 by Walerian Protasewicz

Personal details
- Born: c. 1536 Videniškiai?, Grand Duchy of Lithuania
- Died: 6 April 1609 Alsėdžiai, Grand Duchy of Lithuania
- Buried: Varniai Cathedral
- Denomination: Roman Catholic
- Parents: Matas Giedraitis and Anna Kroszyńska
- Education: University of Königsberg; University of Wittenberg; University of Tübingen; University of Leipzig

Merkelis Giedraitis (Polish: Melchior Giedroyć; c. 1536 – 6 April 1609) was a Bishop of Samogitia from 1576 to 1609. In recognition of his efforts, Giedraitis is often referred to as the second baptist of Samogitia (the first official baptism of Samogitia took place in 1413–1417).

Born into the princely Giedraičiai family and educated at Protestant universities in the Duchy of Prussia and Germany, Giedraitis actively combated the Reformation by implementing resolutions of the Council of Trent in Samogitia. He inherited a much neglected diocese that was reduced to only about 20 priests. He became known for his devotion and work to end clerical abuses, strengthen churches and schools, and increase the number of priests. Giedraitis invited the Jesuits to Kražiai where the Kražiai College was established already after his death and the Bernadines to Kretinga where they established the first monastery in Samogitia. He sponsored Mikalojus Daukša, who translated and published Catechism (1595) and Postil (1599) in the Lithuanian language—the first Lithuanian books printed within the Grand Duchy of Lithuania. He also supported Maciej Stryjkowski, author of the first printed history of Lithuania.

== Early life and education ==
Giedraitis was born into the Giedraičiai family of the Lithuanian nobility. His father Motiejus Giedraitis was a Court Marshall of Lithuania and was sent on a diplomatic mission to the Grand Duchy of Moscow in 1551. The family's main estate was in Videniškiai and it is likely that Merkelis Giedraitis was born there. His date of birth is unknown, but estimated to be c. 1536 because at the time of his appointment as bishop he was around 40-years old. His portrait completed in 1585 recorded that he was 48-years old at the time (i.e. born in 1537).

In February 1551, together with his brother Kasparas, he enrolled at the University of Königsberg. He then disappears from written records for a decade. In February 1560, he enrolled at the Universities of Wittenberg. Six months later, he was the first among eight Lithuanian students who were brought by their tutor Jurgis Zablockis to the University of Tübingen. The group was initiated by Pier Paolo Vergerio who visited Vilnius twice and Mikołaj "the Black" Radziwiłł. With short breaks, Giedraitis studied in Tübingen for about three years.

There, in 1561, he published his only known work – a 16-page Latin eulogy to commemorate the death of Katarzyna, the mother of Piotr Wiesiołowski, a fellow Lithuanian student in Tübingen. She was a Protestant. The 244-line eulogy shows Giedraitis' mastery of the Latin language as well as familiarity with classical authors (Theocritus, Virgil) and Greek mythology (Philomela, Niobe, Nestor, etc.). At the end of 1563, together with two relatives of Grand Chancellor Ostafi Wołłowicz and Teodor Skumin Tyszkiewicz, Giedraitis enrolled at the University of Leipzig. As it was quite common at the time, Giedraitis did not earn an academic degree.

Giedraitis studied at four Protestant universities and was close with some Protestant activists, but there is no evidence that he converted to Protestantism – documents related to his appointment as bishop are silent on the issue.

== Early career ==
After his studies, Giedraitis worked as a secretary at the Grand Duke's chancellery. Together with his brother Kasparas, he signed the Union of Lublin in 1569 which established the Polish–Lithuanian Commonwealth. In Vilnius, Giedraitis was noticed by Bishop of Vilnius Walerian Protasewicz who offered him a teaching position and likely encouraged him to become a priest. Giedraitis was ordained as a priest in 1571. In February 1572, Protasewicz raised Giedraitis to members of the cathedral chapter and put him in charge of church property (custos).

When Bishop of Samogitia Jurgis Petkūnas died in July 1574, Jakub Uchański, Primate of Poland and Archbishop of Gniezno, attempted to promote his nephew Jakub Woroniecki to the vacancy. He was supported by Tolomeo Gallio, Cardinal Secretary of State. Bishop Protasewicz, Samogitian cathedral chapter, Lithuanian Jesuits, Mikołaj Krzysztof "the Orphan" Radziwiłł, and other nobles protested this nepotism and instead promoted Giedraitis, who had a clear advantage of speaking Lithuanian and Samogitian. They also opposed increasing Polish influence in Lithuania after the Union of Lublin – bishops were automatically granted a seat in the Senate of Poland–Lithuania. Any new bishop first needed a nomination from the king. At the time, the king was Henry de Valois who abandoned the Polish–Lithuanian Commonwealth in June 1574 to become the King of France. Therefore, Giedraitis traveled to Paris to obtain the nomination in person in April 1575. At the same time, he acted as an envoy of Lithuanian nobles in an attempt to persuade Henry to return to Poland–Lithuania. Pope Gregory XIII approved Giedraitis as bishop on 16 January 1576 and he was consecrated by Protasewicz during Easter in Vilnius.

== Bishop of Samogitia ==
=== Diocesan affairs ===
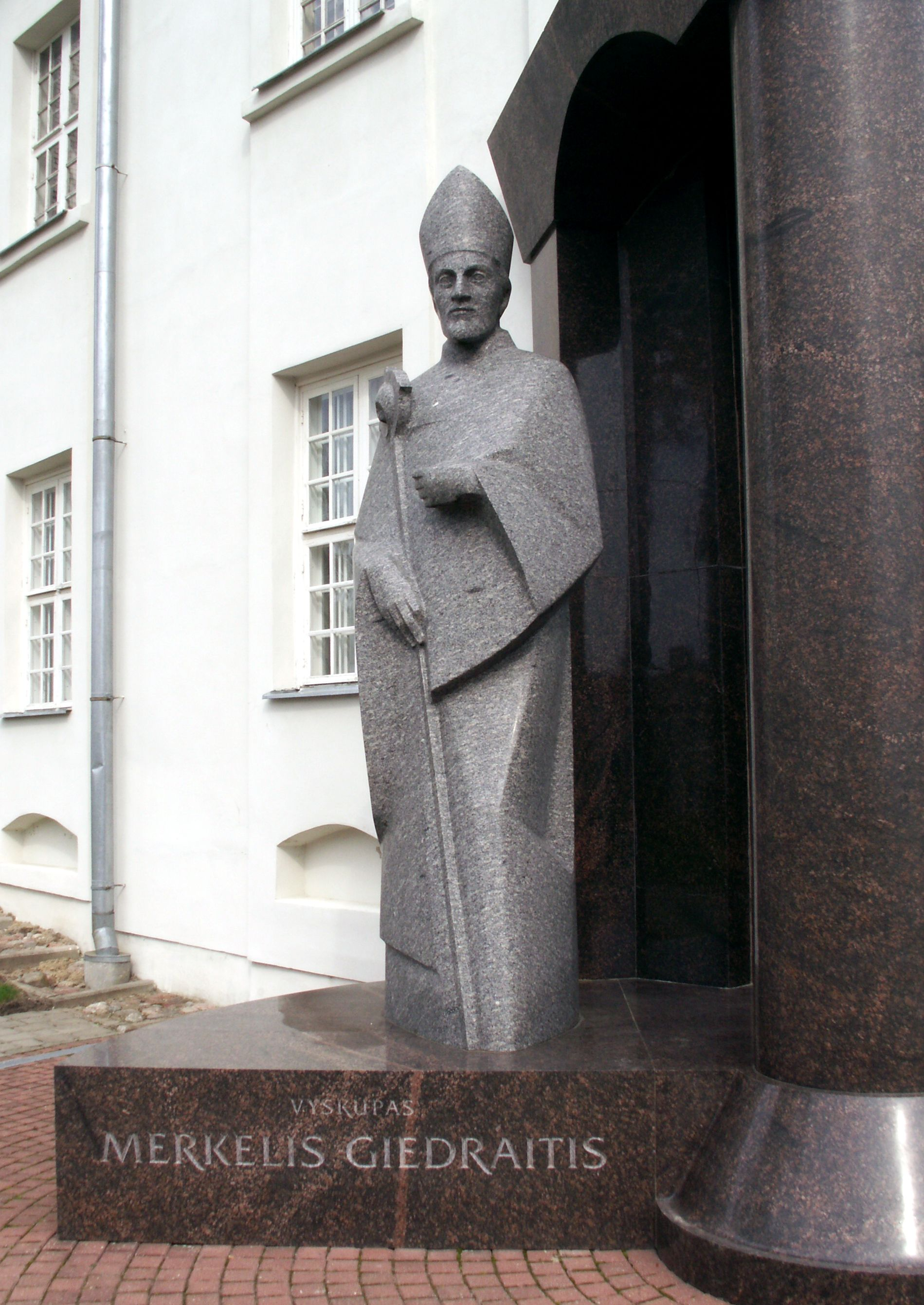
Monument to Giedraitis next to the Samogitian Diocese Museum

==== Neglected diocese ====
Giedraitis found the diocese neglected. Giedraitis conducted a canonical visitation with Jesuit Mikołaj Sędkowski (Latin: Nicolaus Sedkovius, Lithuanian: Mikalojus Sedkovskis) in 1576. Tarquinius Peculus, the plenipotentiary of the papal nuncio Giovanni Andrea Caligari, conducted an apostolic visitation in 1579. The report provides a detailed picture of the neglect. Peculus described neglected churches, poorly educated priests who could not recite the Ten Commandments or barely read Latin, did not speak local language despite living in the diocese for over thirty years, shirked their pastoral duties and held masses only occasionally, openly kept lovers and raised illegitimate children, etc. Only one priest, Mikalojus Daukša, was evaluated as properly qualified and diligently going about his church duties. Of the seven members of the cathedral chapter, only three were ordained priests. According to a list from 1589, the diocese had 58 Catholic churches, but only 27 of them were open. Others were empty or taken over by the Protestants.

==== Priest education ====
The diocese had only about 18 to 20 priests (about seven of them spoke Lithuanian), and the shortage of priests – particularly those who spoke Lithuanian – was one of the most pressing issues. There was no priest seminary in Lithuania until Vilnius Priest Seminary was established in 1582. That meant that most priests came from Poland after they could not get a local posting due to lack of education or moral virtues. Only a few select Lithuanian nobles could travel to universities abroad. Varniai cathedral school provided primary education. Giedraitis established and taught at educational courses in Alsėdžiai that prepared about twenty priests; one of them – Melchior Gieysz – later became bishop of Samogitia. Based on the last will of his predecessor Jurgis Petkūnas, Giedraitis sponsored education of 12 clerics at the seminary in Vilnius laying the foundation for the Samogitian Priest Seminary.

He also sought to establish Kražiai College, which was accomplished after his death. Giedraitis sought assistance from the Jesuits and invited them to Samogitia. In April 1582, he consecrated St. James's Cathedral, Riga, which was granted to the Jesuits by King Stephen Báthory. The Jesuits in Riga organized several missions into northern Diocese of Samogitia, but that was insufficient and Giedraitis wrote to the Superior General of the Society of Jesus asking to send Jesuit missionaries. The Superior General sent two men, Motiejus Galminas and Merkelis Daugėla, who settled in Kražiai.

==== Churches and parishes ====
Giedraitis worked to strengthen existing parishes, regain parishes taken over by the Protestants, and establish new parishes. He obtained two royal decrees (from Stephen Báthory on 1 August 1578 and from Sigismund III Vasa on 2 April 1592) ordering the Protestants to return lands and property usurped from the Catholic Church. In several instances, Giedraitis had to sue the Protestants in courts. He managed to recover several churches, including in Kražiai, Kėdainiai, Linkuva (1605), and Kelmė (shortly after his death in 1609). Giedratis constructed certain tents next to Catholic churches occupied by the Protestants so that Catholic priests could attract people visiting the traditional parish festivals. The Reformation peaked in Samogitia in 1580s and 1590s.

During Giedraitis' tenure, twelve new churches were built in the diocese. They were funded by the King, nobles, or Giedraitis himself. Some of them were built near the borders with the Protestant Duchy of Prussia and Duchy of Livonia. When Giedraitis died, the diocese had 50 parishes. According to Motiejus Valančius, Giedraitis established three deaneries (in Virbalis, Viduklė, and Luokė) in 1587, but documents mentioning deaneries in the diocese date only from 1619–1620.

When Giedraitis became the bishop, there were no monasteries in the diocese. In 1603, Hetman Jan Karol Chodkiewicz brought the Bernadines to Kretinga where they established the Kretinga Monastery.

==== Pastoral work ====
Giedraitis was actively involved with the congregation – he frequently visited different parishes, delivered sermons in Lithuanian, heard confessions, taught basic catechism, etc. He supported and worked to implement decisions of the Council of Trent except there is no evidence that Giedraitis called an annual diocesan synod as mandated by the council. There is evidence that he did call a synod in 1577 or 1578, which would be the first known synod in the diocese. He worked to improve discipline among the priests, fought corruption by preventing several church benefices falling into same hands, combated informal marriages that did not receive proper matrimonial sacrament, insisted on proper liturgy, etc. Giedraitis was fond of church singing and developed a local choir and brought it to perform at Vilnius Cathedral. He also authorized singing during wakes.

=== Other activities ===
==== Patronage ====
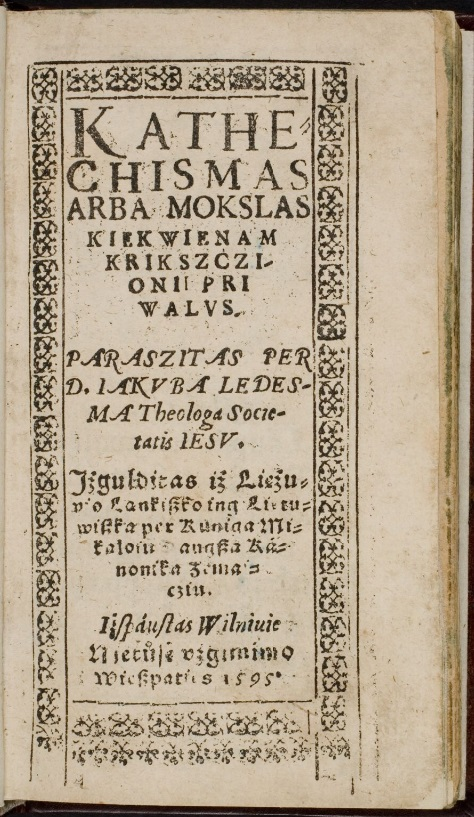
Title page of the Catechism of Mikalojus Daukša sponsored by Giedraitis – the first Lithuanian-language book printed in the Grand Duchy of Lithuania

He supported the Lithuanian language and sponsored publication of the first Lithuanian printed books in the Grand Duchy of Lithuania. In 1595, Mikalojus Daukša translated a catechism by Diego de Ledesma, a Spanish Jesuit, and published it as Catechism, or Education Obligatory to Every Christian in Vilnius. Four years later, Daukša published the much larger Catholic Postil (collection of sermons) which was translated from a Polish postil by Jakub Wujek. In the prefaces of his Catholic Postil, Daukša expressed that the Lithuanian language situation had improved and thanked to Giedraitis for his works.

In 1578, Maciej Stryjkowski arrived to Varniai. Sponsored by Giedraitis, he became a member of the Samogitian cathedral chapter and wrote a history of the Grand Duchy of Lithuania which was published in 1582. It became the first published history of Lithuania. The postil and the history were both dedicated to Giedraitis.

In 1579, when the Jesuit Academy was established in Vilnius (predecessor to Vilnius University), Giedraitis became its protector. He donated some land near Riešė and Stirniai (near Ukmergė) to the academy. Together with his brother, Giedraitis also funded the Church of St. Lawrence in their native Videniškiai.

==== Royal election and coronation ====
Before the 1576 Polish–Lithuanian royal election, a congress of nobles from the Grand Duchy of Lithuania was held on 20 April 1576 in Grodno. It adopted a document, signed by Giedraitis and other participating nobles, stating that if the delegates of the Grand Duchy of Lithuania felt pressure from the Poles in the election sejm, the Lithuanians would not be obliged by an oath of the Union of Lublin and will have the right to select a separate monarch.

On 29 May 1580, Giedraitis crowned Stephen Báthory as Grand Duke of Lithuania in Vilnius Cathedral. During this ceremony, Giedraitis presented Báthory with a luxuriously decorated sword and a hat adorned with pearls sanctified by Pope Gregory XIII. This ceremony manifested the sovereignty of the Grand Duchy of Lithuania and had the meaning of elevation of the new Grand Duke of Lithuania, this way ignoring the stipulations of the Union of Lublin.

==== Political involvement ====
In addition to his duties in the diocese, Giedraitis had responsibilities in the Senate of the Polish–Lithuanian Commonwealth. For a number of years, he was a member of a commission tasked with the delineation of the border between Samogitia and Courland. In 1601, he mediated the dispute between the Radziwiłł and the Chodkiewicz families.

The Diocese of Samogitia was poor and neglected and many bishops looked for better positions in other dioceses, particularly the Diocese of Vilnius. During Giedraitis' tenure, the Diocese of Vilnius was vacated twice – in 1579 after the death of Walerian Protasewicz and in 1591 after the reassignment of Jerzy Radziwiłł to the Diocese of Kraków – but for unknown reasons, Giedraitis did not pursue the post. After Radziwiłł's reassignment in 1591, the King wanted to move Bernard Maciejowski, Bishop of Lutsk, to Vilnius. However, Grand Chancellor Lew Sapieha refused to confirm the appointment leading to a power struggle that lasted almost a decade. Benedykt Woyna, the new Bishop of Vilnius, was confirmed only in 1600. Giedraitis was an ardent supporter of Sapieha and argued against appointing a "foreigner" to bishops in Lithuania.

== Death and legacy ==
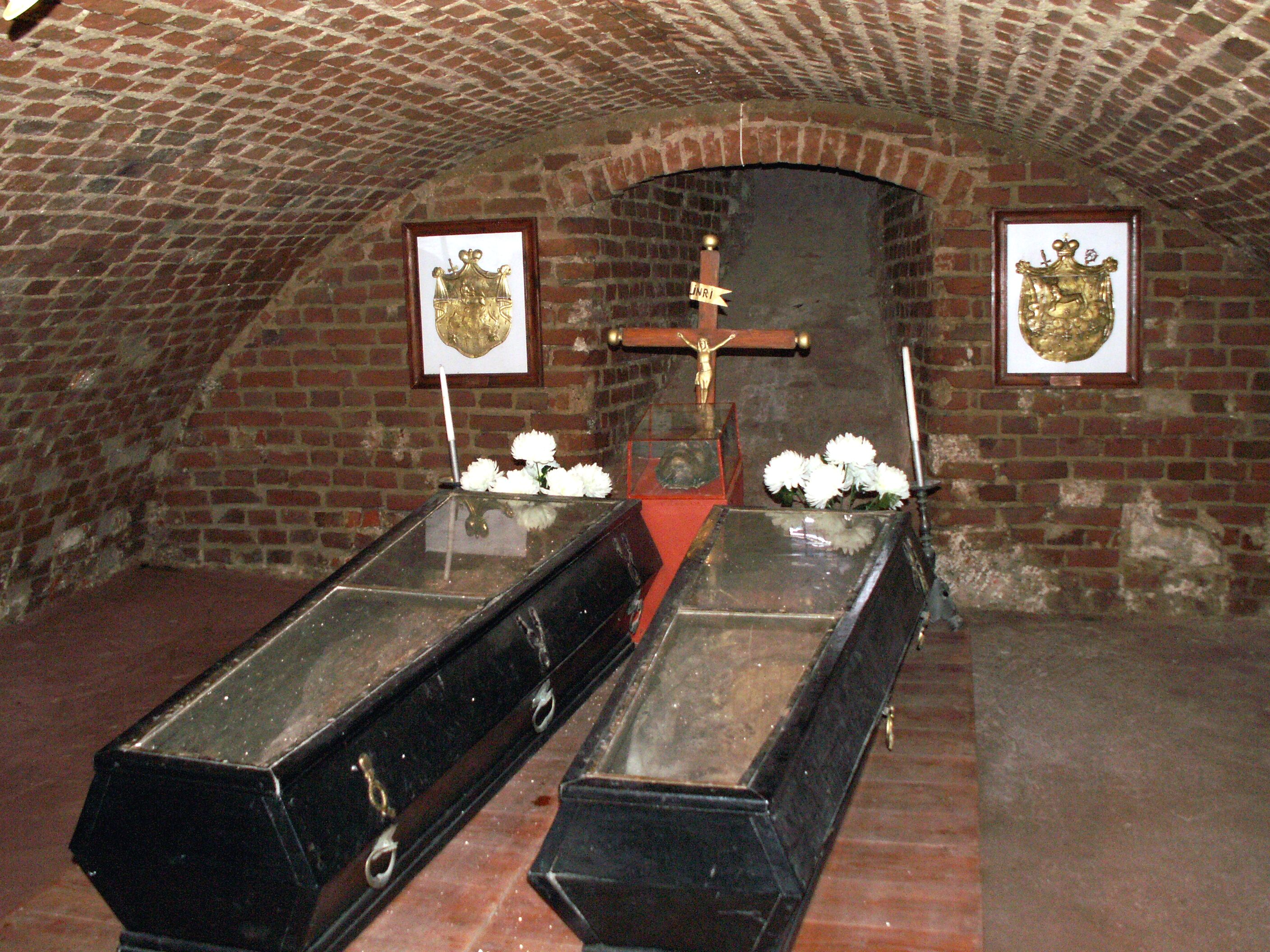
Caskets of Bishops Merkelis Giedraitis and Juozapas Arnulfas Giedraitis at Varniai Cathedral

Giedraitis died on 6 April 1609 and was buried in a crypt of the Varniai Cathedral on 11 May. In his last will, Giedraitis left money for the upkeep of a church in Viduklė and for the construction of a church in Pašvitinys, asked that two clerics be sent to receive education in Vilnius, and bequeathed his library (about 100 books) to the future Kražiai College.

Giedraitis efforts and accomplishments were held in high regard, particularly by the Jesuits. They even reported apparitions of Giedraitis in Varniai Cathedral after his death. The cathedral chapter tasked Jonas Kazakevičius (Jan Kosakiewicz), auxiliary bishop of Samogitia, to write a biography of Giedraitis, but it was not done. Bishop Motiejus Valančius (1801–1875) ordered a marble tomb of Giedraitis installed in Varniai Cathedral in 1853. On the occasion of the Church Jubilee in 1900, Lithuanian Americans sent a letter to Pope Leo XIII asking to canonize Giedraitis and Andrius Rudamina, the first Lithuanian missionary to China. In 1909, Lithuanians commemorated the 300th death anniversary of Giedraitis with prayers and articles about his life. While his beatification case was not started, some Lithuanians pray to Giedraitis (e.g. a prayer to him was included in a prayer book published by Stasys Yla in 1964).

In 1999, the year the Samogitian Diocese Museum opened and the 400th anniversary of the publication of the Postil of Mikalojus Daukša, a monument to Giedraitis and Mikalojus Daukša was unveiled next to the museum.

== See also ==
- Media related to Merkelis Giedraitis at Wikimedia Commons

Catholic Church titles
Preceded by Jurgis Petkūnas	Bishop of Samogitia; 1576–1609	Succeeded by Mikołaj Pac
