= Pietkiewicz =

Pietkiewicz (Polish pronunciation: [pjɛtˈkjɛ.vit͡ʂ]) is a Polish-language surname.

== People ==
- Antoni Pietkiewicz (born 1948), Polish engineer, businessperson and politician
- Bogusława Pietkiewicz (1944–2012), Polish diver
- Stan Pietkiewicz (born 1956), American basketball player
- Stanisław Pietkiewicz (1894–1986), Polish cartographer and geographer
- Jurgis Petkūnas (Polish: Jerzy Pietkiewicz; died 1574), Lithuanian bishop
- Merkelis Petkevičius (Polish: Melchior Pietkiewicz; c. 1550–1608), a Lithuanian nobleman, writer, and religious activist

== See also ==
- Petkevich
