= Jurgis Petkūnas =

Lithuanian bishop

- Bishop of Samogitia
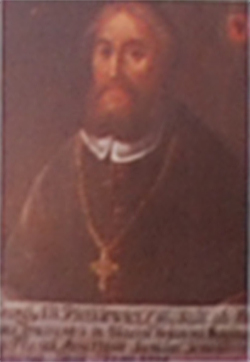
- Painting of Petkūnas from the 18th century
- Church: Roman Catholic Church
- Diocese: Diocese of Samogitia
- Installed: 14 November 1567
- Term ended: July 1574
- Predecessor: Wiktoryn Wierzbicki
- Successor: Merkelis Giedraitis

Personal details
- Born: Eišiškės, Grand Duchy of Lithuania
- Died: July 1574 Varniai, Grand Duchy of Lithuania
- Buried: Varniai Cathedral
- Denomination: Roman Catholic
- Education: University of Wittenberg; University of Padua; University of Ferrara

Jurgis Petkūnas (also Petkevičius, Petkonis; Polish: Jerzy Pietkiewicz; died in 1574) was a Bishop of Samogitia from 1567 to 1574. He received medical education in universities in Germany and Italy. Despite his lack of theological education, Petkūnas was confirmed as bishop in November 1567. He inherited a neglected diocese that had only about 20 priests and faced competition from the Protestants. He was the first Samogitian bishop charged with implementing the Counter-Reformation decisions of the Council of Trent.

== Early life and education ==
Petkūnas was born in Eišiškės to a wealthy Lithuanian noble family. He was orphaned as a child. He studied at the University of Wittenberg and University of Padua and University of Ferrara where he earned a doctorate in medicine in May 1556. Petkūnas returned to Lithuania and became a physician of bishop Jan Domanowski as well as the Calvinist supporter Mikołaj "the Black" Radziwiłł. According to an anonymous satire from 1568, Petkūnas also served as a royal physician.

He became a canon of the cathedral chapter in Varniai, which was then the seat of the Diocese of Samogitia. In November 1563, he became a canon of the cathedral chapter in Vilnius, capital of the Grand Duchy of Lithuania and seat of the Diocese of Vilnius. On 30 January 1567, Grand Duke Sigismund Augustus sent a request to Pope Pius V to reassign bishop Wiktoryn Wierzbicki from Samogitia to now vacant Diocese of Lutsk and to appoint Petkūnas as bishop of Samogitia. Despite his lack of theological education, Petkūnas was confirmed as bishop on 14 November 1567.

== Bishop ==
The diocese did not have a permanent bishop for about four years and Petkūnas found it neglected and affected by the Protestant Reformation. He was the first Samogitian bishop charged with implementing the Counter-Reformation decisions of the Council of Trent. However, little is known about his activities in the diocese; he likely spent a lot of time in Vilnius and not in Samogitia. In 1569, together with other bishops, he signed the Union of Lublin. He supported reconstruction of the Church of St. Francis and St. Bernard in Vilnius and bequeathed religious paintings from Holland, liturgical objects and robes to Varniai Cathedral. In his last will, Petkūnas left 1,700 kopas of Lithuanian groschens to send twelve students to the Jesuit Academy in Vilnius. The money was used by his successor Bishop Merkelis Giedraitis to construct a house in Vilnius for Samogitian clerics.

In 1573, Petkūnas promoted his nephew Petras Petkūnas, ordained only as an acolyte, to a canon of the cathedral chapter in Varniai and gave him parishes in Betygala and Viduklė. However, Petras Petkūnas neglected his parishes and frequently lived in Vilnius.

Petkūnas died in 1574 and was buried in a crypt of the Varniai Cathedral.

== Evaluation ==
In letters of Cardinal Michele Bonelli, before his appointment as bishop, Petkūnas was evaluated as having two undesirable traits – relatively low birth and enjoying alcohol more than what would be appropriate for a bishop. Petkūnas was ridiculed in In quendam antistitem, a Latin poem by Pedro Ruiz de Moros, a Spaniard working in Vilnius, for neglecting his duties and spending his time hunting. The poem was quoted by Bishop Motiejus Valančius in his influential history of the Diocese of Samogitia. Valančius also quoted Albert Wijuk Kojałowicz who claimed that at the time of Petkūnas, the diocese was so neglected that it had just seven priests. This evaluation persisted in historiography, but according to Lithuanian historian Zenonas Ivinskis, it is too critical. According to Ivinskis study, the diocese probably had about 17 to 20 priests. During Petkūnas tenure, only one new parish church was built (in Kvėdarna in 1569).
