= Stanisław Pietkiewicz =

Stanisław Pietkiewicz (1894–1986) was a Polish cartographer and geographer.
