= Varniai =

- City
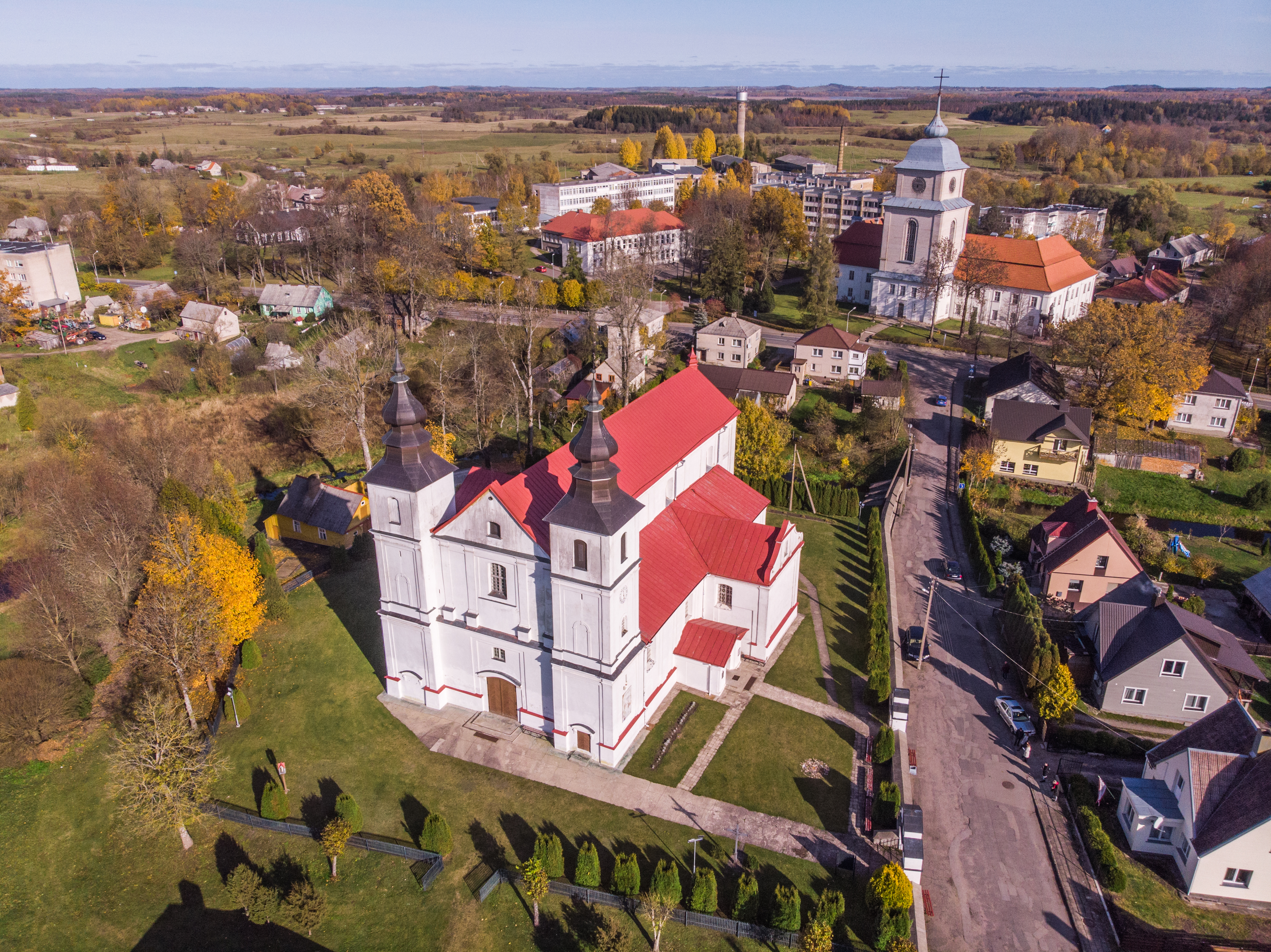
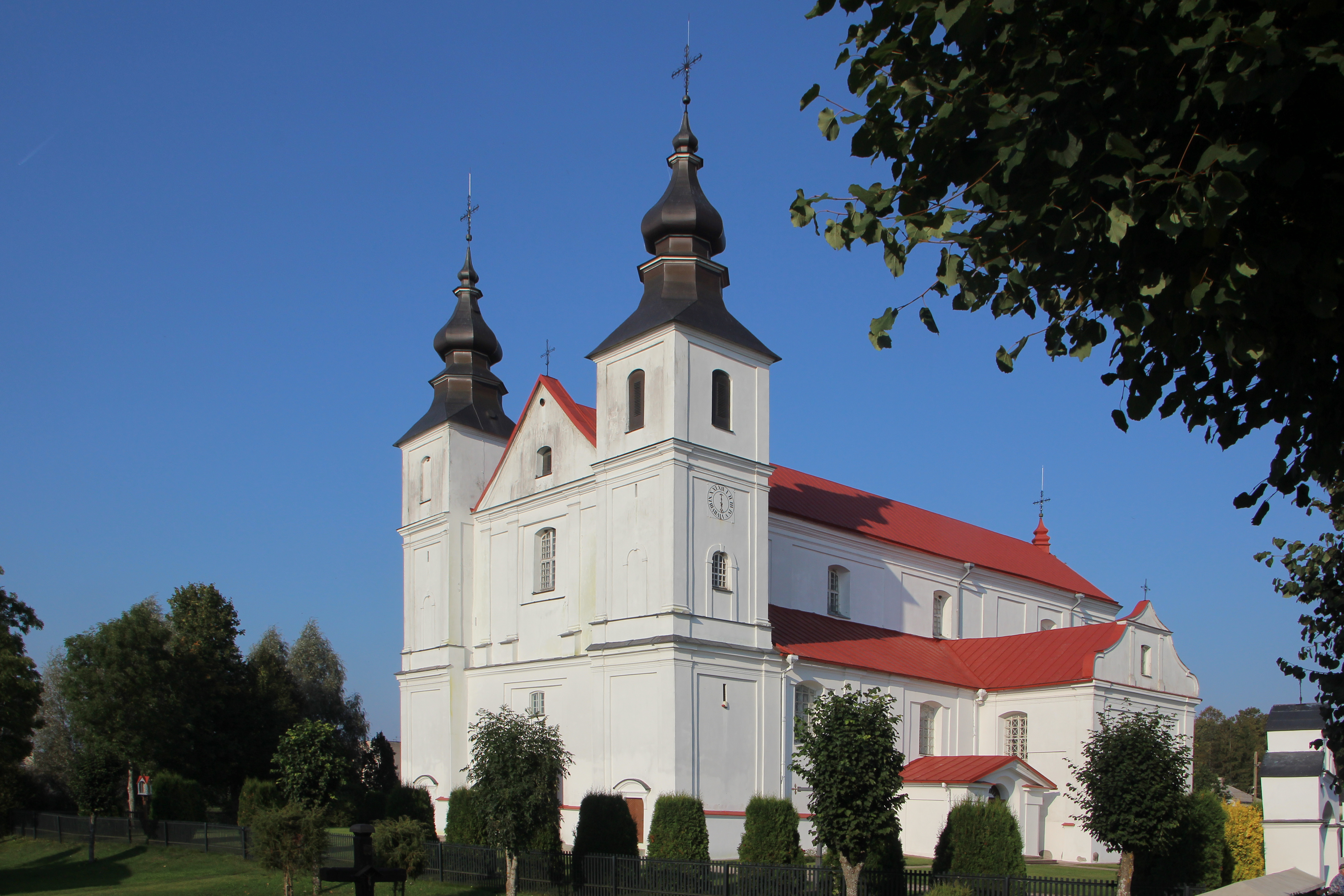
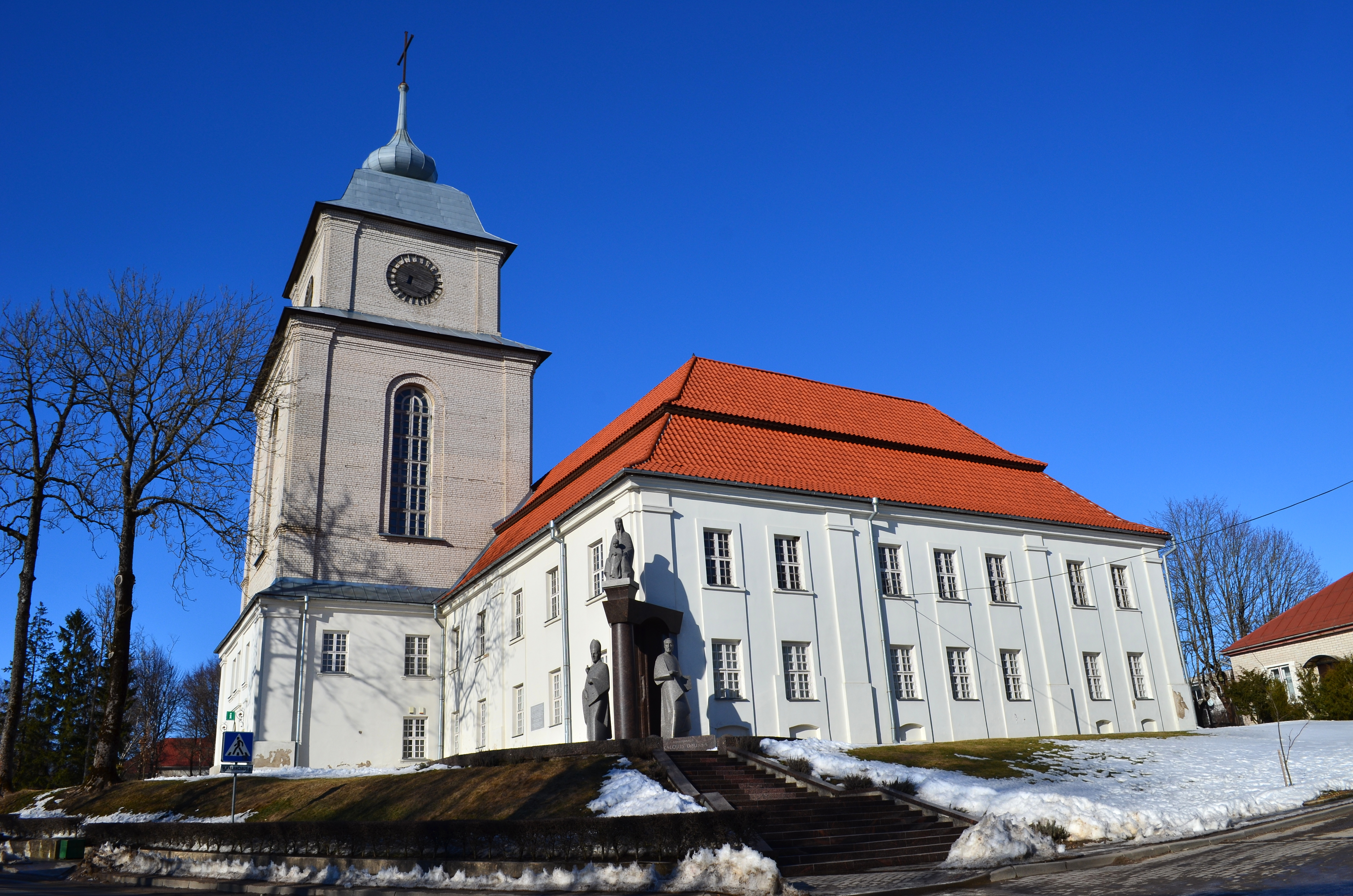
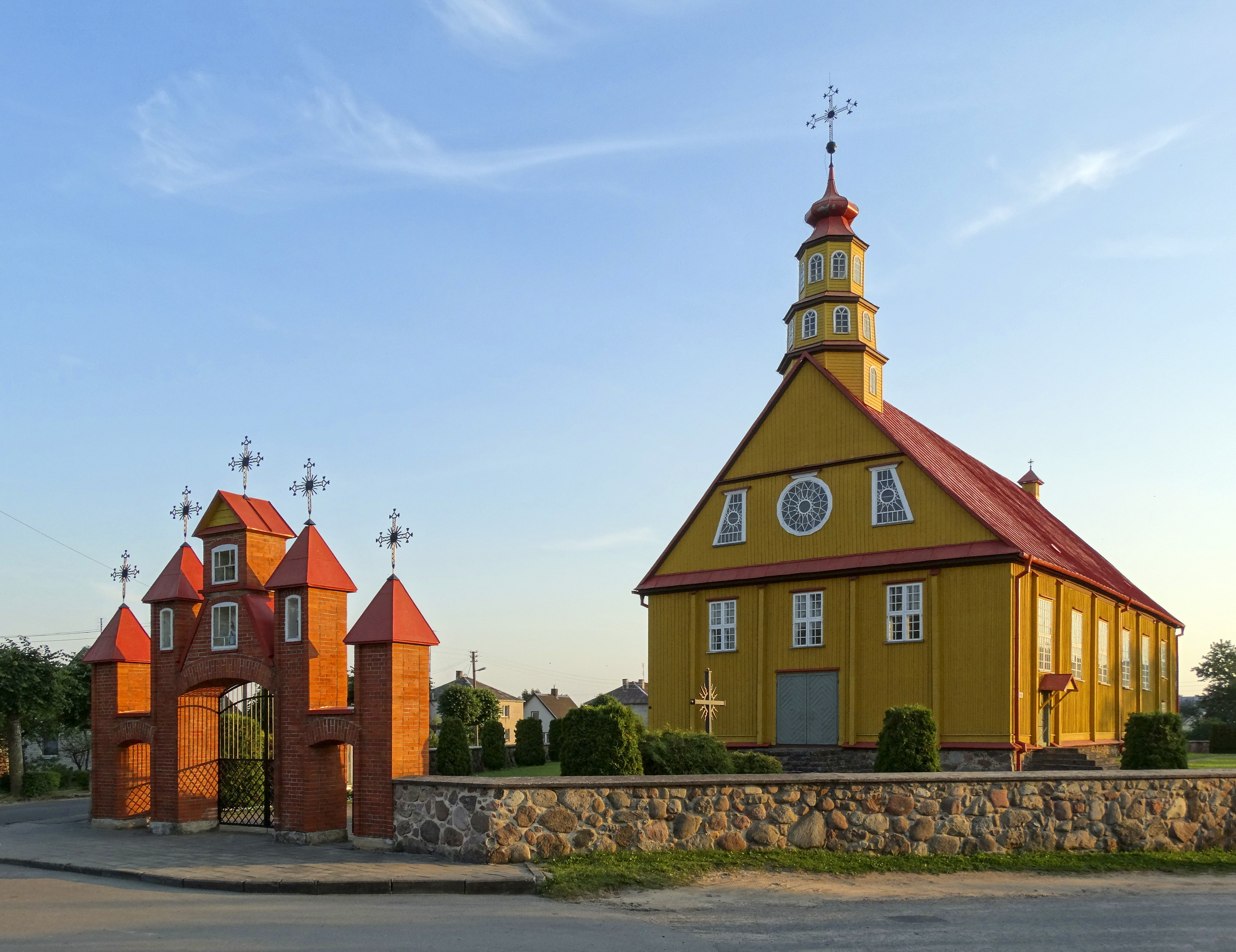
- Aerial view of Varniai Church of St. Peter and St. Paul (formerly cathedral) Samogitian Diocese Museum (formerly the Seat of the Diocese of Samogitia) Varniai Eldership Building St. Alexander's Church

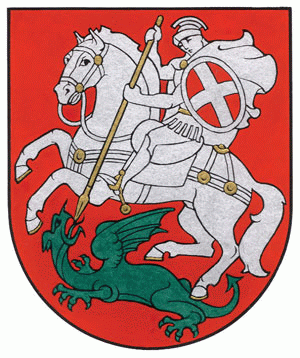
- Coat of arms

- Location of Varniai
- Coordinates: 55°44′0″N 22°22′0″E
- Country: Lithuania
- Ethnographic region: Samogitia
- County: Telšiai County
- Municipality: Telšiai district municipality
- Eldership: Varniai eldership
- Capital of: Varniai eldership
- First mentioned: 1314
- Granted city rights: 1950

Population (2022)
  - Total: 873
- Time zone: UTC+2 (EET)
  - Summer (DST): UTC+3 (EEST)
- Website: Varniai.lt

Varniai (Samogitian: Varnē) is a city in the Telšiai County, western Lithuania. In the Middle Ages the city was known as Medininkai (Samogitian: Medėninkā).

== Etymology ==
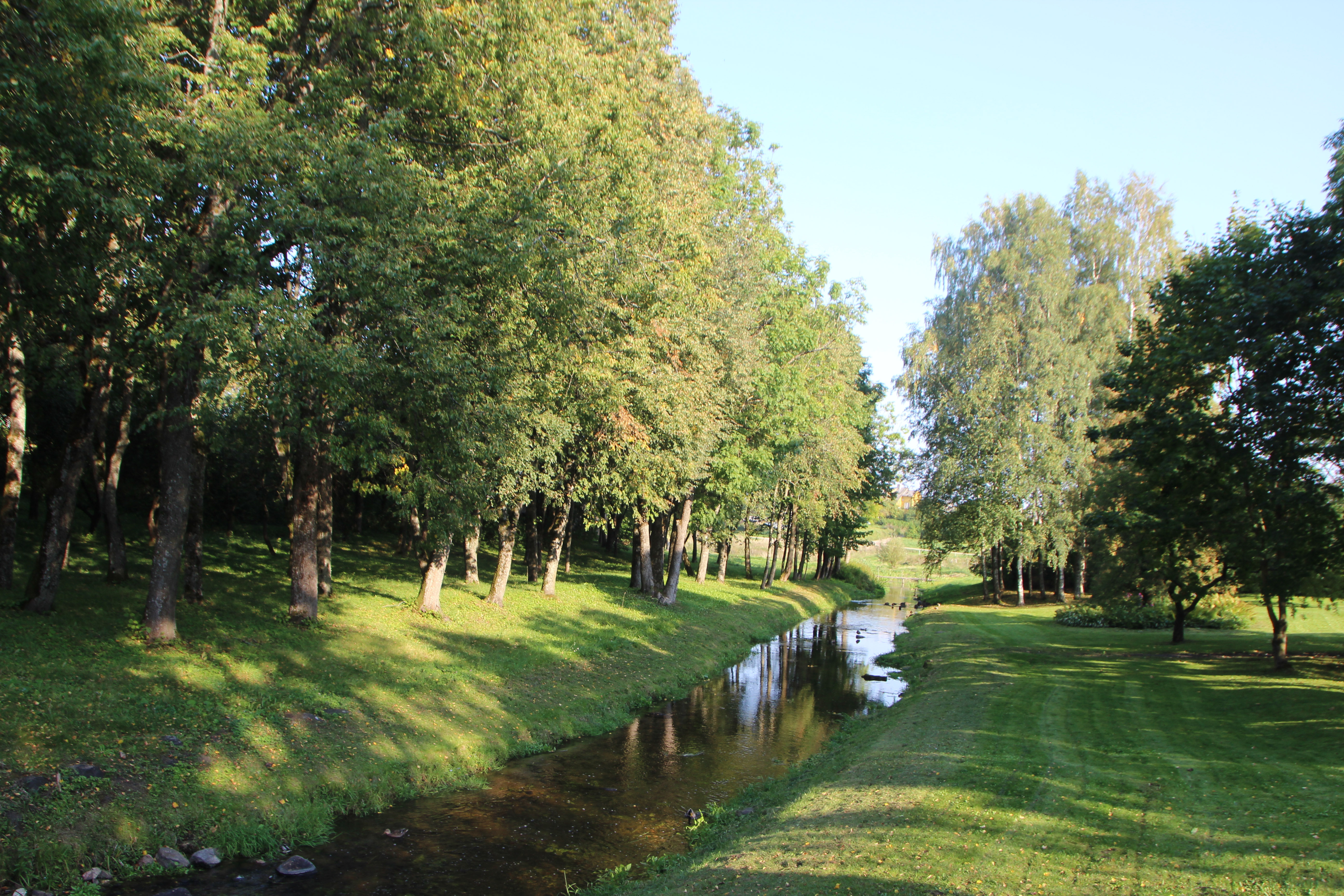
Varnelė River near Varniai

Medininkai or Medenike was first mentioned in 1320. This town existed until the end of the 16th century, when the town of Varniai was founded in the 15th century north of Medininkai, on the left bank of the Varnelė river. The latter name is derived from the Varnelė River, which flows through the town. As early as 1904, Vaižgantas mentions its name as Varnė. In other languages the town is known by: German: Medeniken, Polish: Wornie.

In 1491, the Kulm law was granted to Medininkai, and in 1635, the Magdeburg rights were granted to the renamed Varniai. Eventually, the name of Medininkai disappeared from common usage altogether.

== History ==
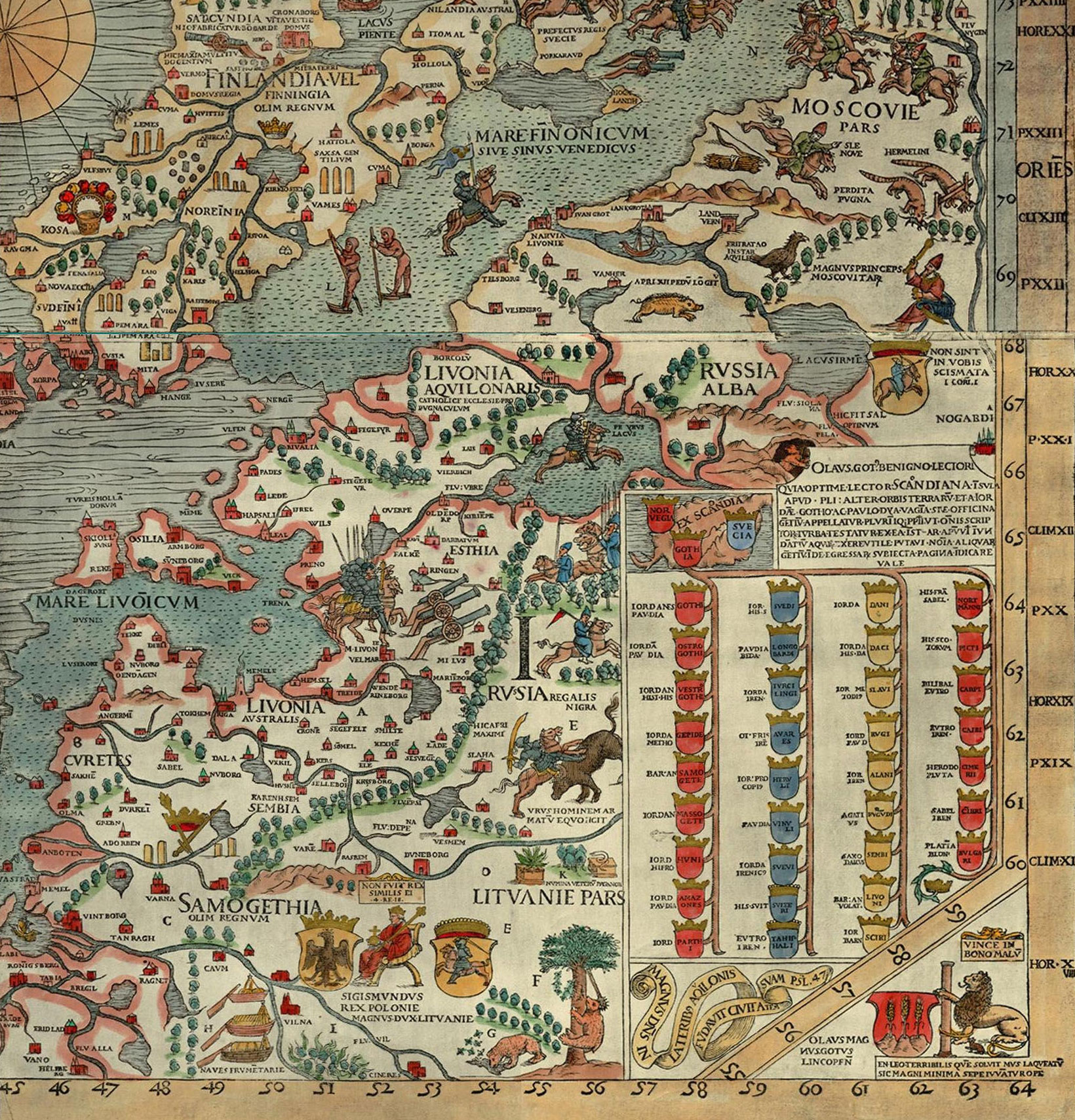
Varniai (Varna) as depicted in Carta marina, 1539

Town established in the 14th century, on the bank of the Varnelė River, near an important Samogitian castle. It was the center of the Samogitian Catholic church: after the baptism of Samogitia, the Samogitian Bishop resided in the town. In 1320, it was the site of the Battle of Medininkai, in which the Samogitians defeated the invading Teutonic Knights. Afterwards, it was invaded by the Teutonic Knights in 1329, and by the Livonian Order in 1377. In 1413, the Supreme Duke of Lithuania and King of Poland Jogaila (Władysław II Jagiełło) and Grand Duke of Lithuania Vytautas the Great ordered the demolition of the pagan temple and Christianized the population. Around 1414–1416 the first church was built, and c. 1464 the first cathedral. In 1425, a third of the population died due to an epidemic. It was granted Chełmno municipal rights in 1491. During the Swedish invasion, the town was plundered by the Swedes in 1655 and 1656. Five diocesan synods were held in the town between 1656 and 1752.

Varniai was the center of the Diocese of Samogitia until the middle of the 19th century when after the January Uprising in 1863 the Tsarist authorities of the Russian Empire moved it to Kaunas.

With support of Merkelis Giedraitis, Mikalojus Daukša translated and made ready for publication Katechizmas, the first Lithuanian language book printed in the Grand Duchy of Lithuania, then part of the Polish–Lithuanian Commonwealth.

Varniai also was the residence of Samogitian bishop Motiejus Valančius.

== Gallery ==
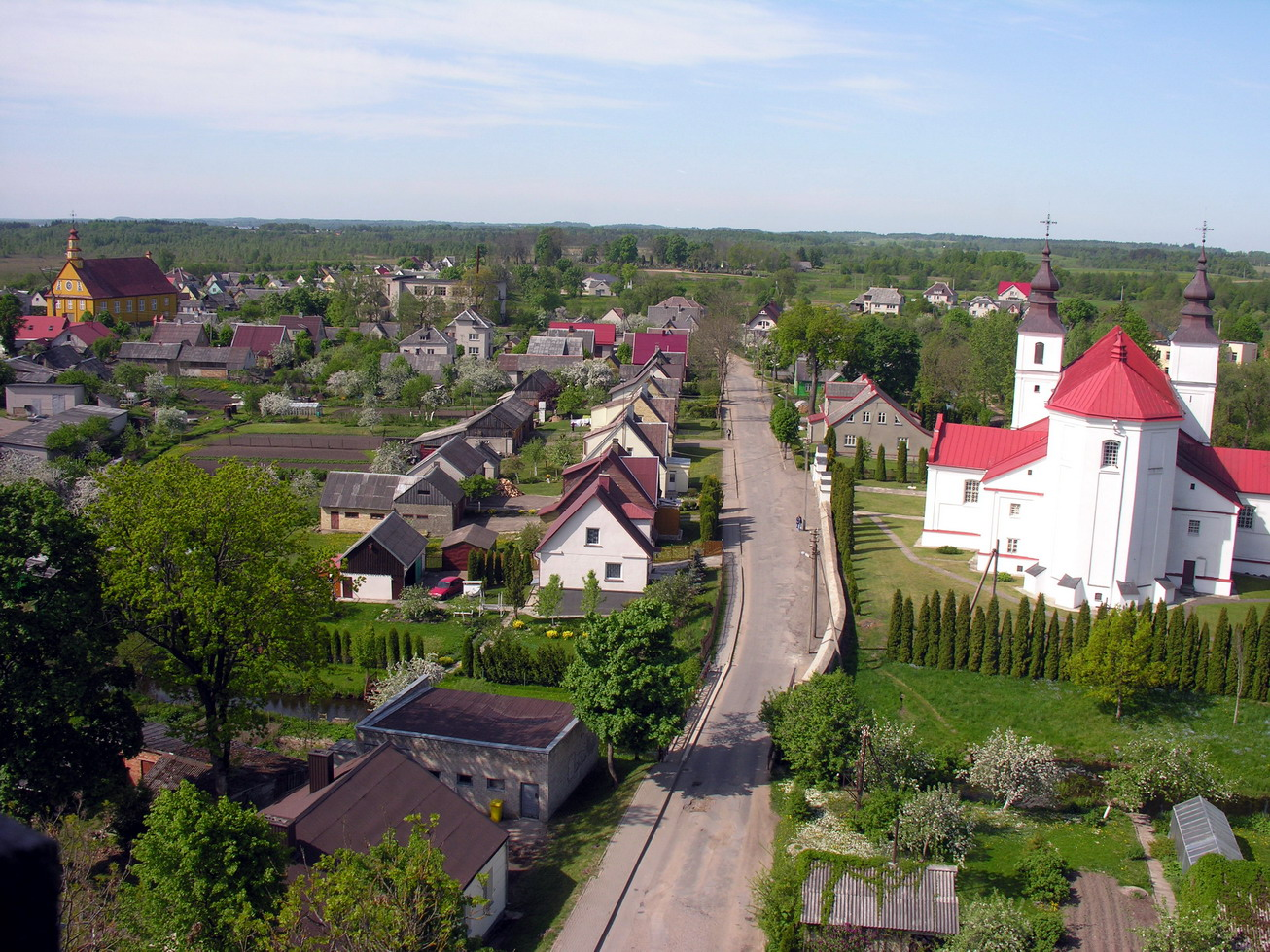
View of Varniai from the tower of the Samogitian Diocese Museum

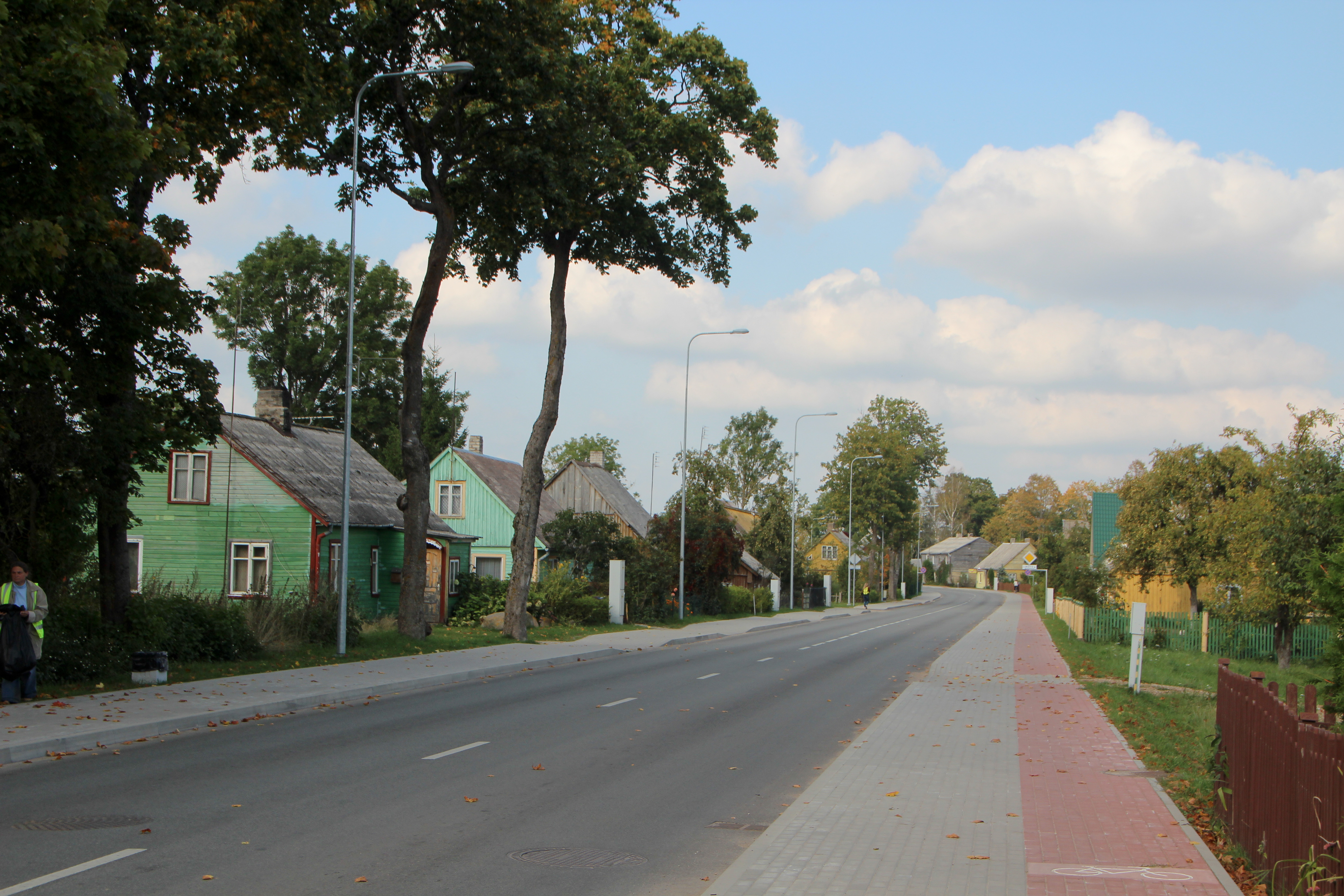
One of streets in Varniai

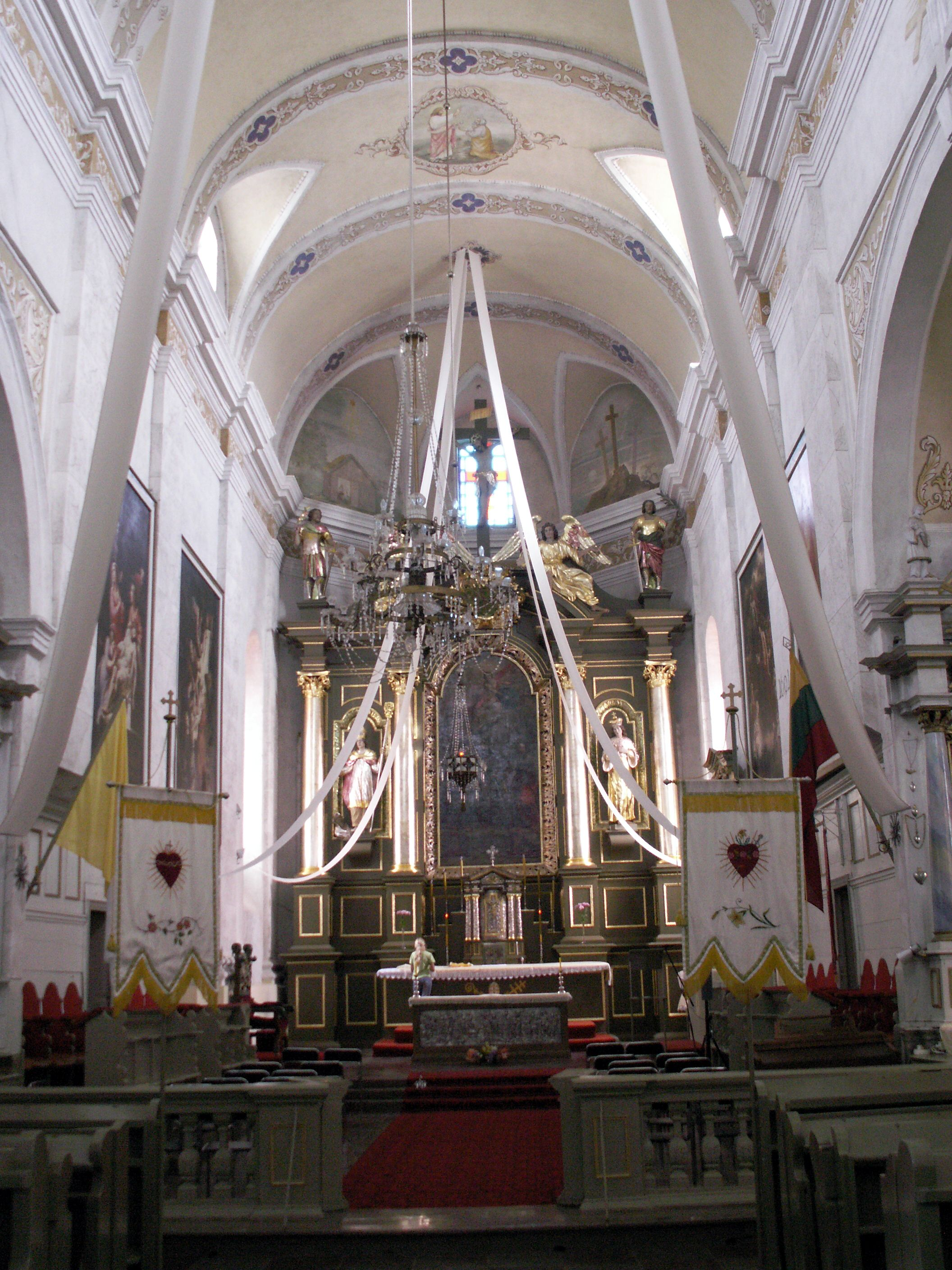
Interior of the Church of St. Peter and St. Paul

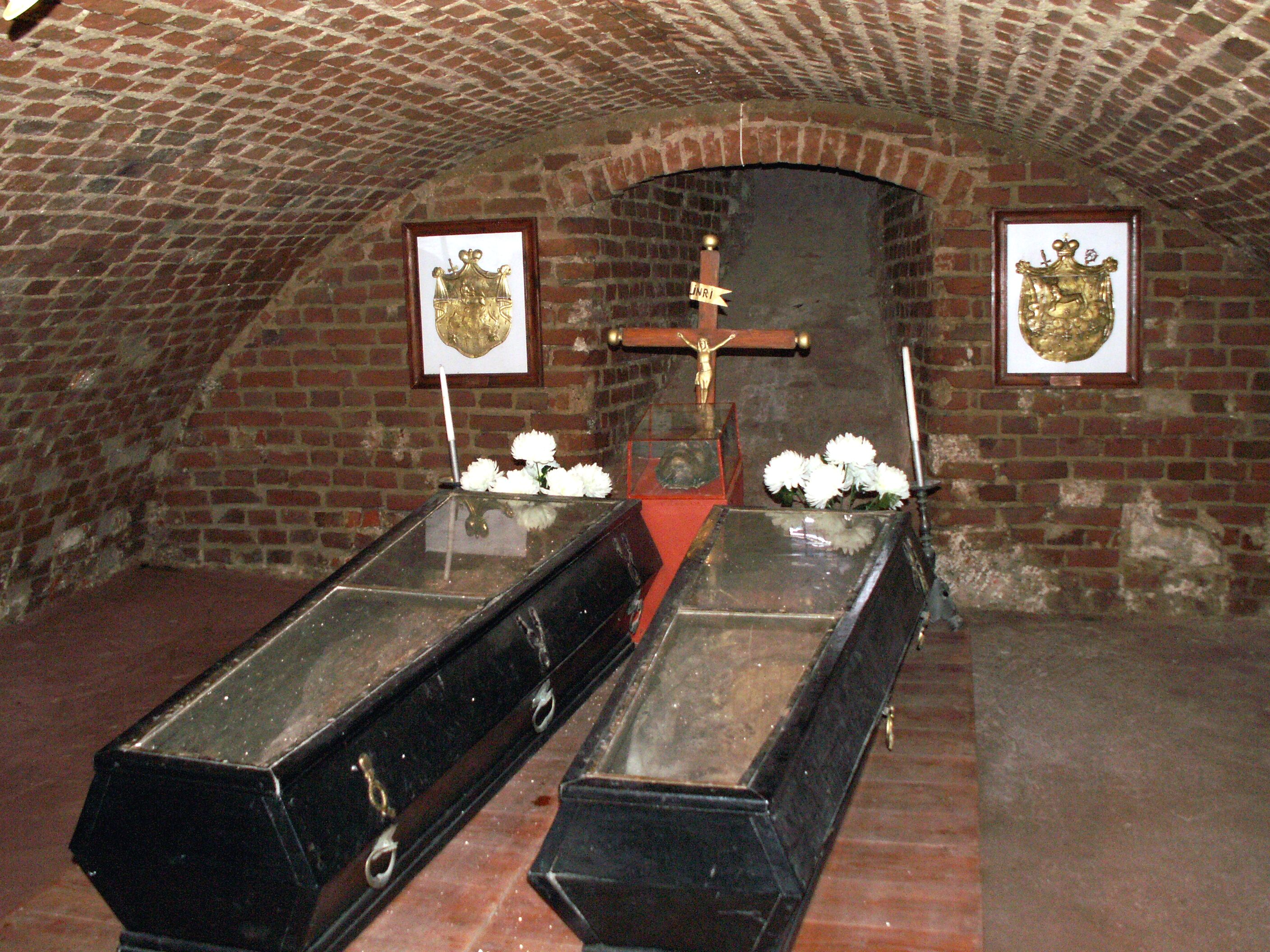
Bishops of Samogitia sarcophagus in the Church of St. Peter and St. Paul basement

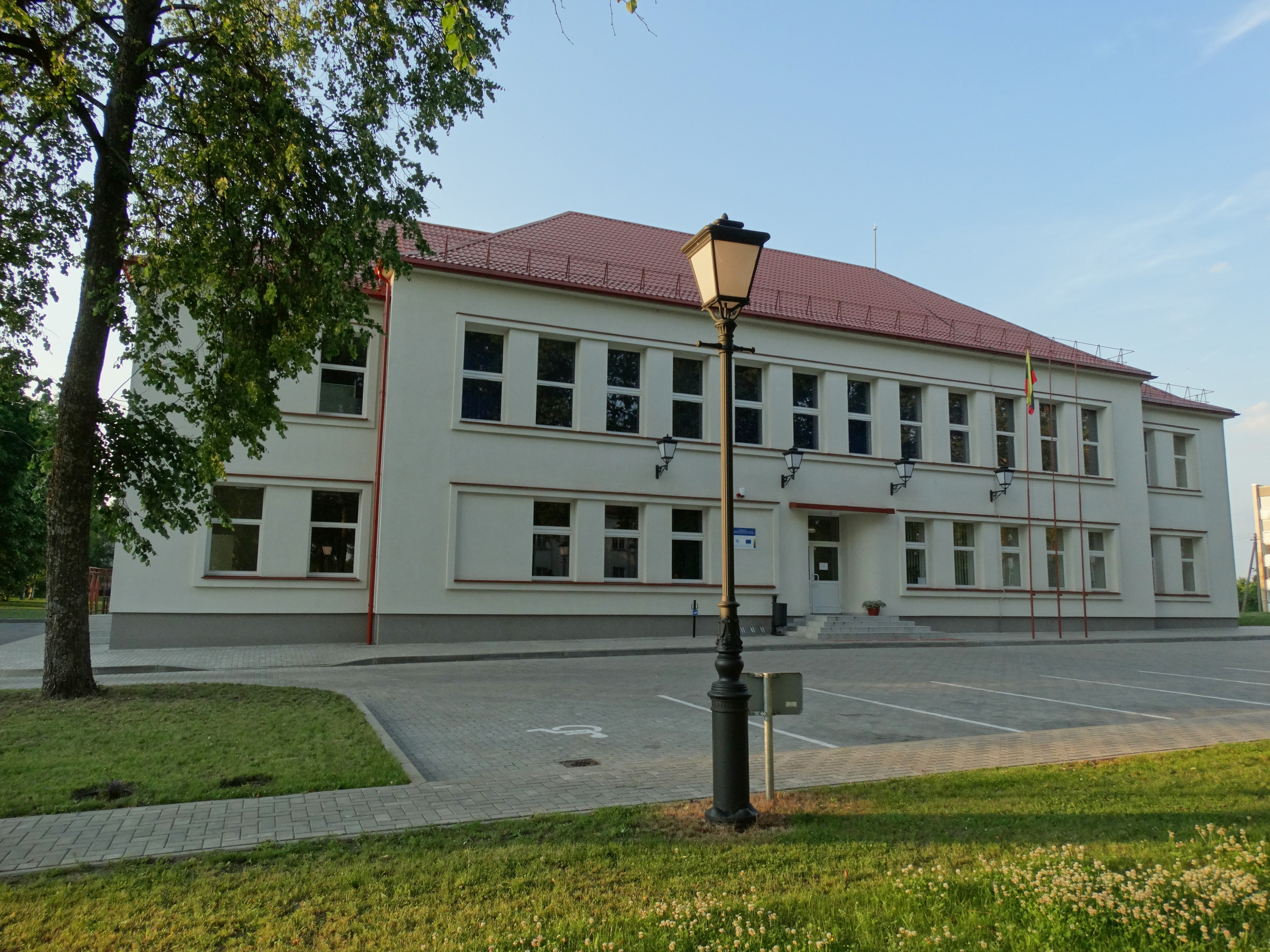
Varniai Centre of Culture

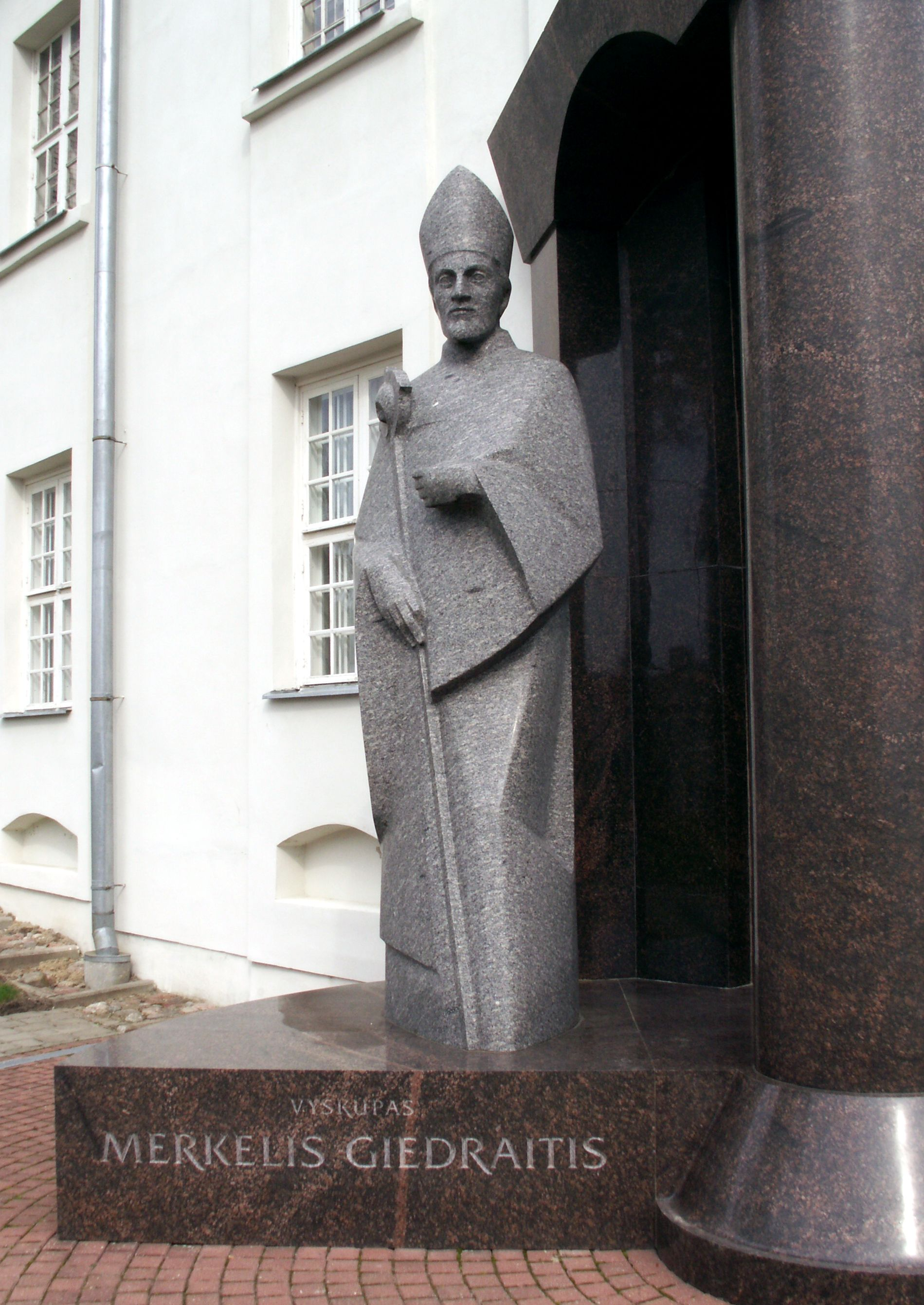
Merkelis Giedraitis Monument

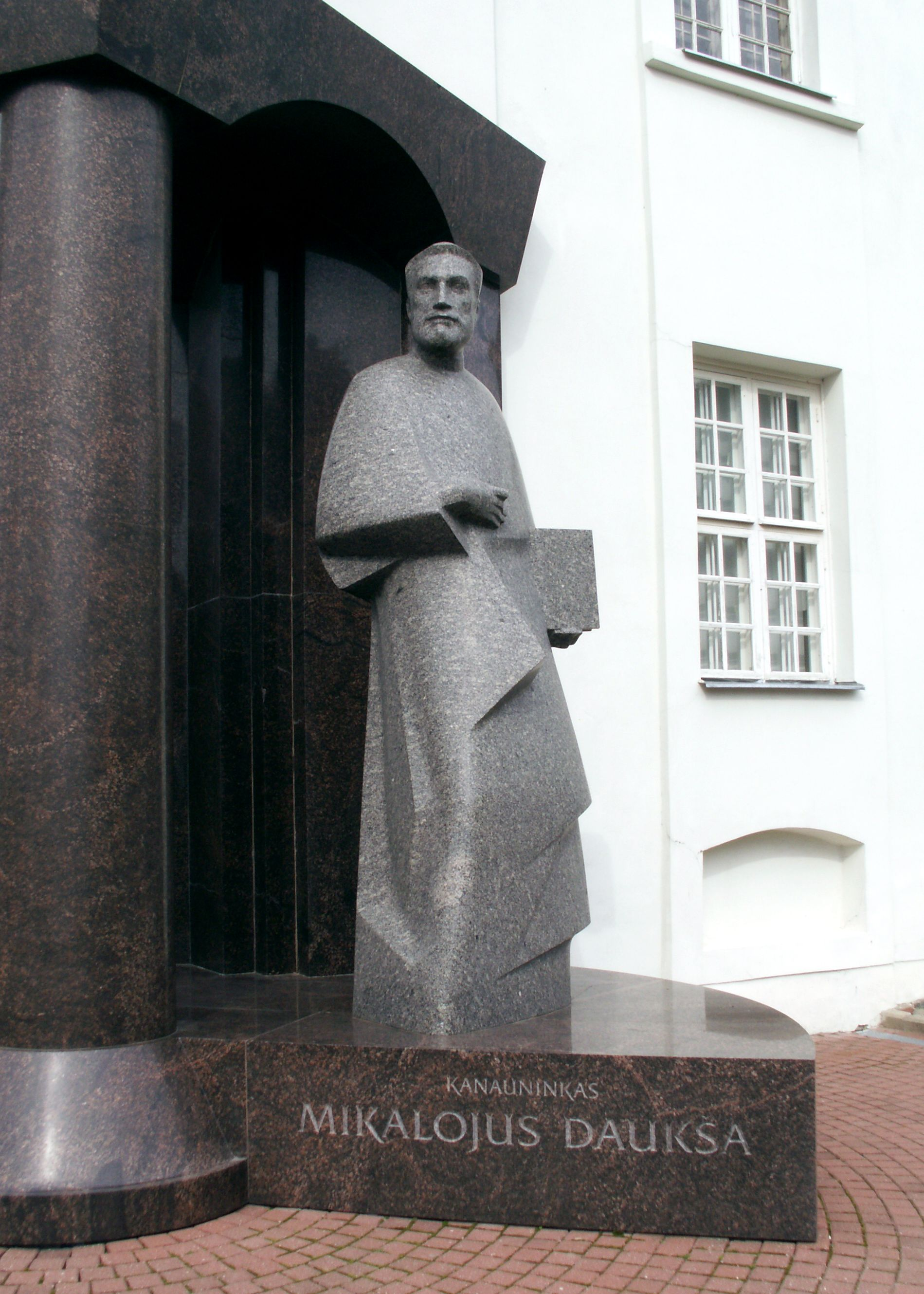
Mikalojus Daukša Monument

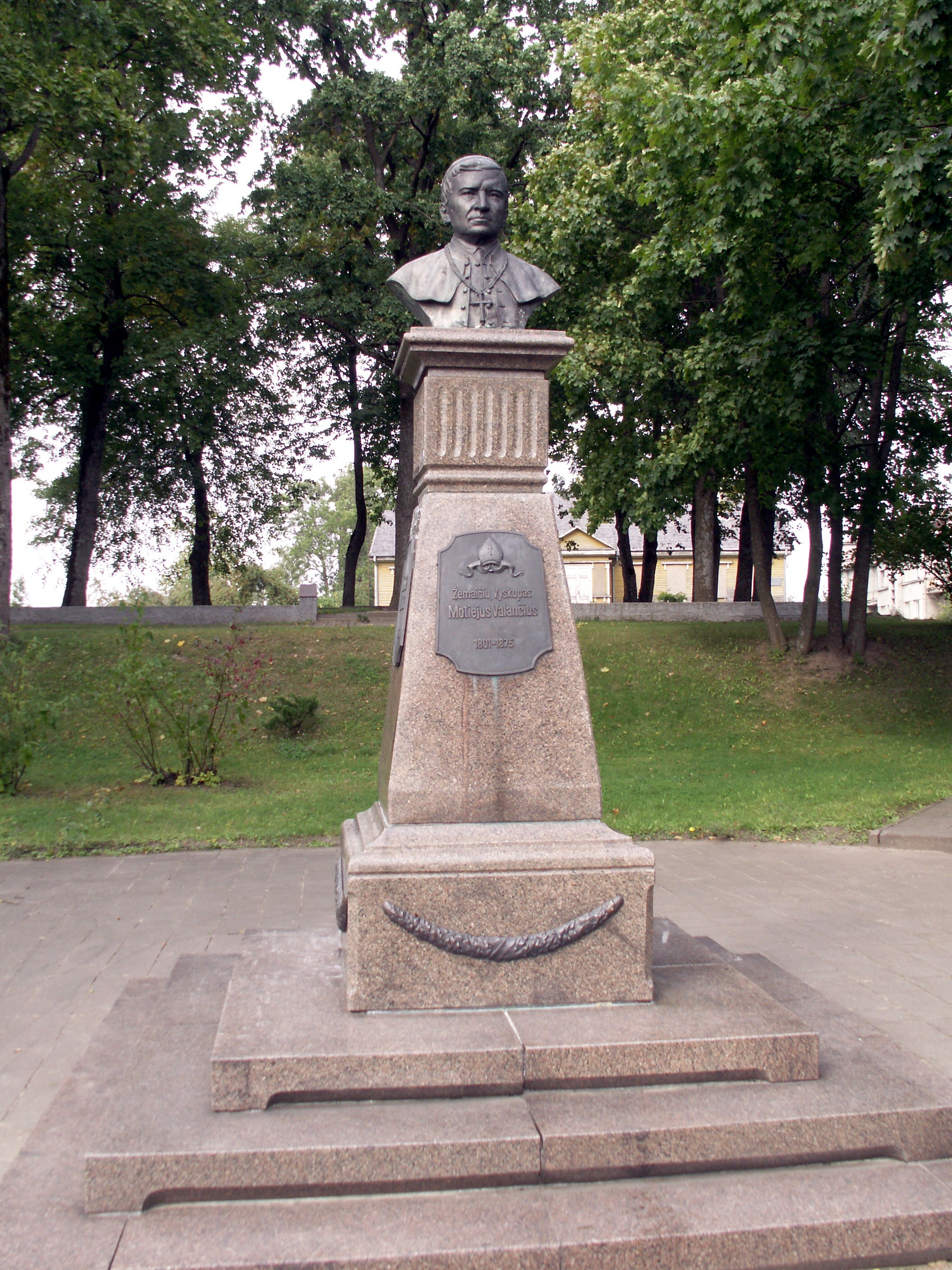
Motiejus Valančius Monument

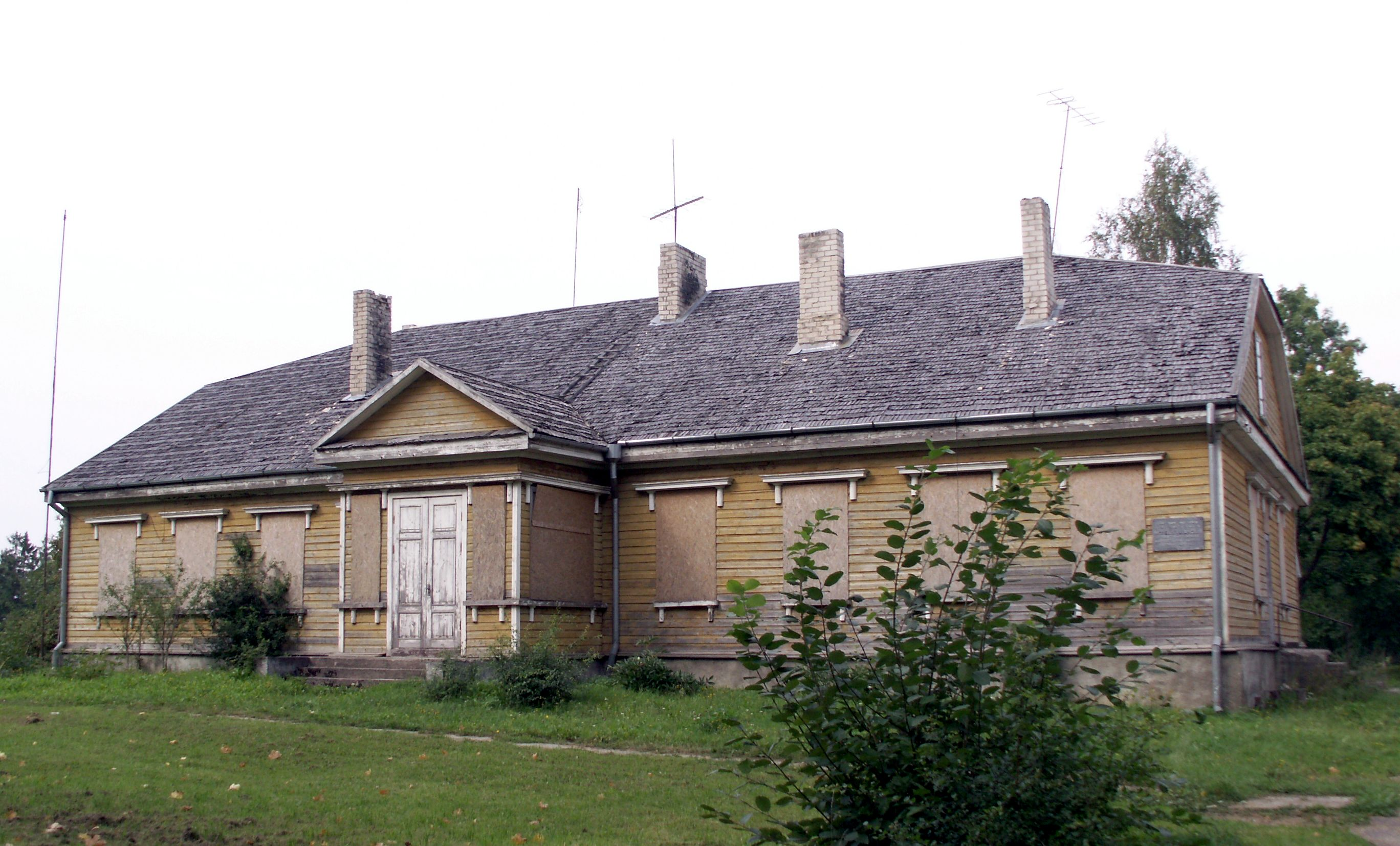
Former house of Motiejus Valančius

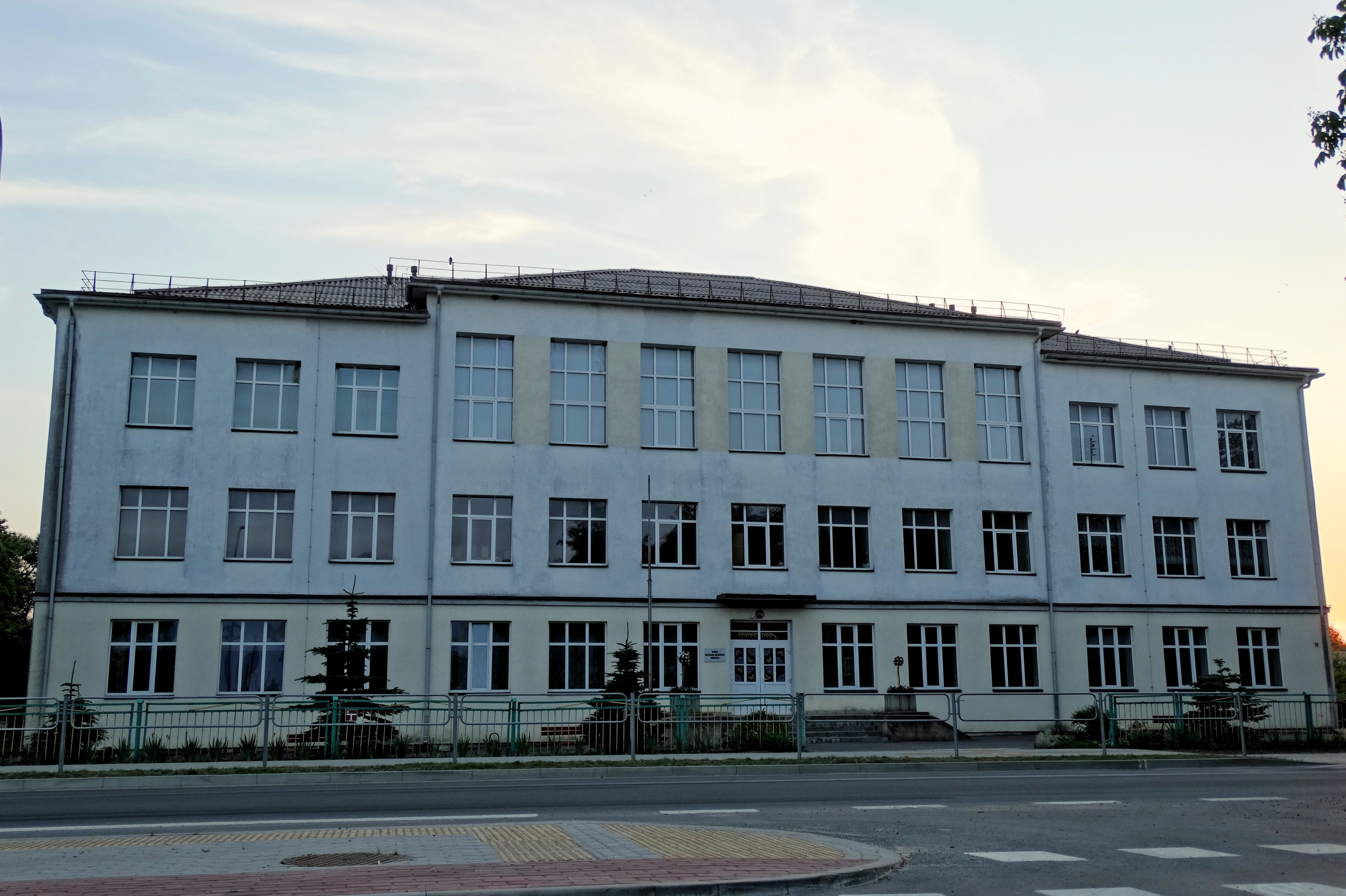
Varniai Motiejus Valančius Gymnasium

== Notable residents ==
- Boris Schatz
- Merkelis Giedraitis
- Mikalojus Daukša
- Motiejus Valančius
