= Petkevich =

Petkevich (Belarusian: Петкевич) is a gender-neutral Slavic surname. Notable people with the surname include:

- John Misha Petkevich (born 1949), American figure skater
- Natalia Petkevich (born 1972), Belarusian politician

== See also ==
- Pietkiewicz
