= Church of St. Peter and St. Paul, Varniai =

Roman Catholic church in Varniai, Lithuania

St. Peter and St. Paul's Church Šv. apaštalų Petro ir Pauliaus bažnyčia
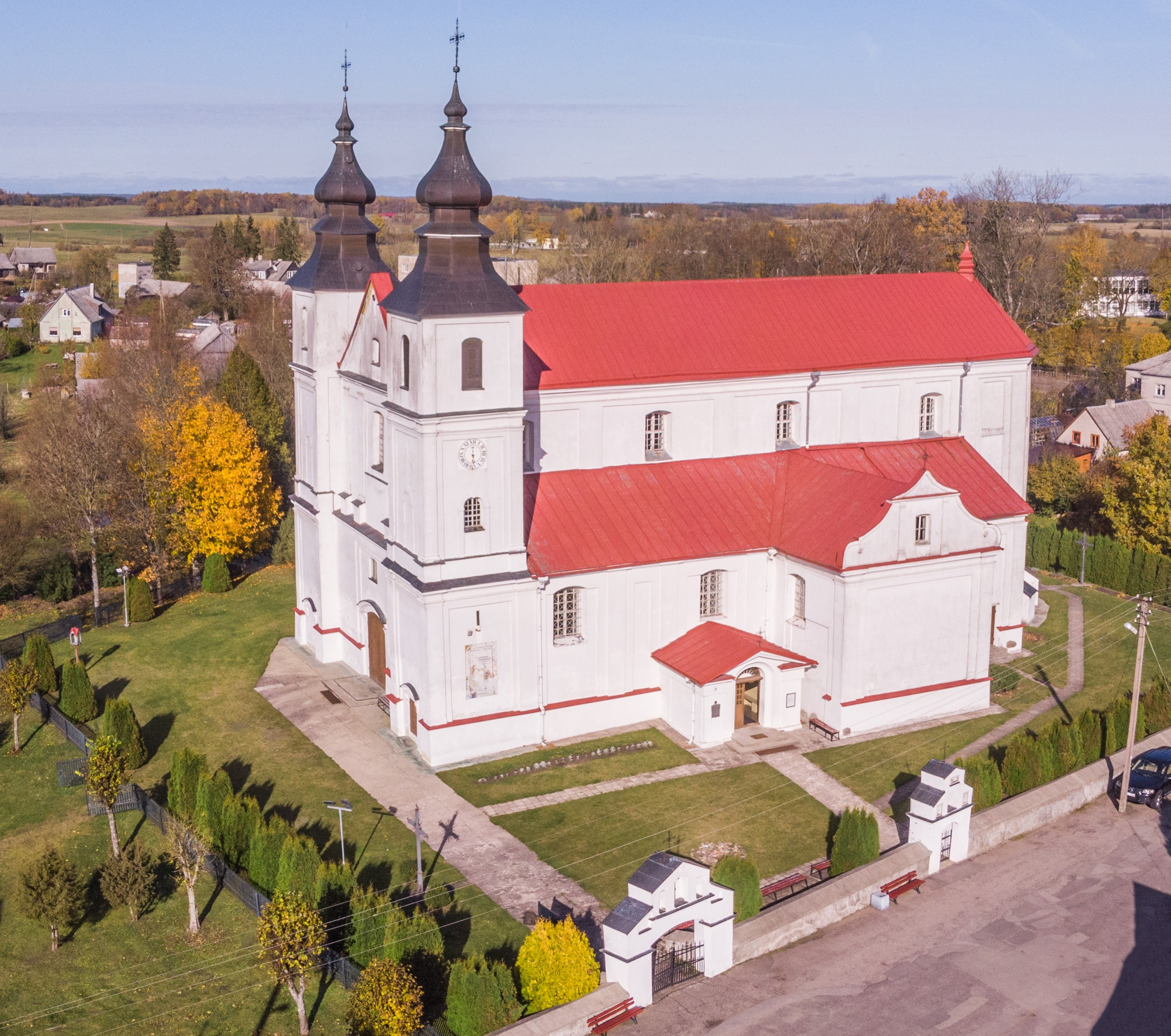

Religion
- Affiliation: Roman Catholic
- Ecclesiastical or organisational status: former Cathedral
- Status: Active

Location
- Location: Varniai, Lithuania
- Interactive map of St. Peter and St. Paul's Church; Šv. apaštalų Petro ir Pauliaus bažnyčia
- Coordinates: 55°44′38″N 22°22′12″E

Architecture
- Style: Baroque
- Funded by: Kazimierz Pac
- Groundbreaking: 1681
- Completed: 1691

Specifications
- Direction of façade: west
- Materials: plastered masonry

Website
- www.varniuparapija.lt

St. Peter and St. Paul's Church (Lithuanian: Šv. apaštalų Petro ir Pauliaus bažnyčia, Samogitian: Šv. apaštuolū Petra ė Pauliaus bažninčė) is a Roman Catholic church in Varniai, Lithuania. Until 1864 the church was the cathedral of Samogitian diocese and the seat of Bishops of Samogitia.

== History ==
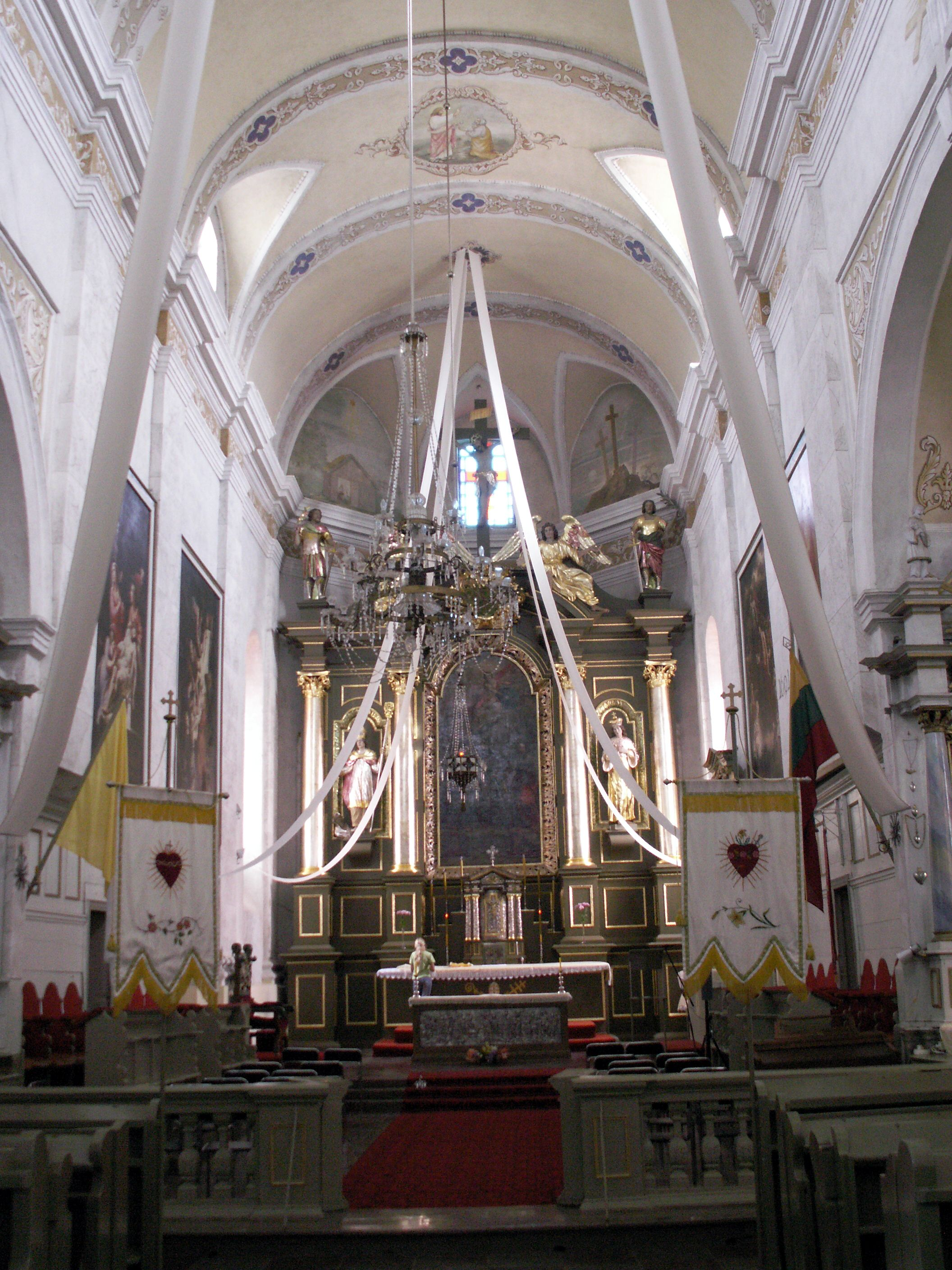
Interior of the church

The first cathedral in Varniai was built in 15th century under the patronage of the Grand Duke of Lithuania Vytautas. The church was built in 1691, ten years since it was started to build. Its construction was funded by Samogitian Bishop Kazimierz Pac after the earlier cathedral was destroyed by fire.

A fire in 1817 made great losses to the church but it was restored by Samogitian Bishop Juozapas Arnulfas Giedraitis.

Until 1864 the church had the title of cathedral and served as the seat of Bishops of Samogitia. However, after the January Uprising, the seat of Diocese was moved to Kaunas and Varniai cathedral became an ordinary church.

It is believed that around 10 Samogitian bishops are buried in the Cathedral.

Today the church belongs to Roman Catholic Diocese of Telšiai and is the center of Varniai parish.

== Architecture ==
The building is of mature Lithuanian baroque architecture: the three-nave basilica with a transept, two chapels, two in front protruding square plan towers with a belfry. This baroque church architecture of the mature style of classicism has become rigid and laconic. Varniai cathedrals interior is rich in artistic monuments: 12 altars, nineteenth century organ. It has 17th-18th centuries' portraits and epitaph plaques of the Samogitian bishops.

The main altar was created in 1694 by Maumo Poloni from Königsberg.

== Sources ==
- Official page of Varniai parish
- Information about the church on the official page of Telšiai Diocese
