= Motiejus Valančius =

Influential 19th-century Lithuanian bishop

- Bishop of Samogitia
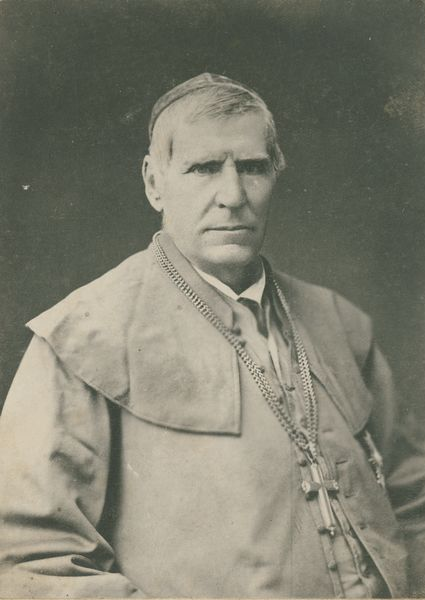
- Valančius in c. 1850
- Diocese: Diocese of Samogitia
- In office: 1850-1875

Personal details
- Born: 28 February 1801 Nasrėnai, Lithuania Governorate, Russian Empire
- Died: 29 May 1875 (aged 74) Kaunas, Kaunas Governorate, Russian Empire
- Buried: Kaunas Cathedral Basilica
- Denomination: Roman Catholic

Motiejus Kazimieras Valančius (Lithuanian pronunciation: [moːtiː.əjʊsʲ vɐɫɐŋtʃjʊsʲ]; Polish: Maciej Kazimierz Wołonczewski, also known by his pen-name Joteika and Ksiądz Maciek; 1801–1875) was a Catholic Bishop of Samogitia, historian and one of the best known Lithuanian/Samogitian writers of the 19th century.

== Biography ==
Motiejus Valančius was born February 28, 1801, into a well-to-do peasant family in Nasrėnai village, Kretinga district. Early in his youth, he had his baptismal records altered to indicate noble birth; the family name was Polonized to Wołonczewski. This practice, not uncommon among prosperous peasants, was a means of providing educational opportunities otherwise denied to Lithuanian children. In 1816 he entered the Dominican school at Žemaičių Kalvarija and six years later began his studies at the Theological Seminary in Varniai. He transferred to the Vilnius Priest Seminary in 1824, from which he graduated in 1828. Ordained a priest that same year, he spent the next six years teaching religion in Mazyr. In 1834 he returned to Lithuania to take up a teaching position at the Kražiai College.

In 1840 he was assigned to the Vilnius Theological Seminary, where he lectured in pastoral theology and biblical archaeology and where he earned his doctorate in theology in 1842. That same year on orders of the Tsar, the academy, its teaching staff and student body, was moved to St. Petersburg, Russia. Valančius came back to Lithuania because of health problems in 1845 and was appointed rector of the Varniai Priest Seminary, serving in this capacity until 1850. Having been absent from Lithuania during the anti-Russian uprising in 1831, Valančius was considered to be relatively apolitical, and thus the Russian government did not object when he was proposed as an Episcopal candidate for the see of Samogitia.

== Bishop ==
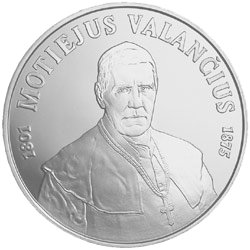
Litas commemorative coin dedicated to the 200th birth anniversary of Motiejus Valančius

He was consecrated bishop in 1850, the first peasant to head over that diocese. Taking up his duties, he guided the diocese for the next 25 years, years of religious, political and social change not only within Samogitia but in Lithuania as a whole. He expanded and improved the Samogitian parochial school network, wrote many religious books, and in 1858 inaugurated a temperance movement, which grew to encompass nearly a million members, almost half of Lithuania's population. He also wrote the first Lithuanian language history of the Samogitian diocese, which has not lost its scientific value even nowadays.

His pastoral and educational work was interrupted by the uprising of 1863–1864 and was made extremely difficult as the Russian government tightened its reins after the revolt's defeat. Yet these circumstances did not prevent him from following a course that brought him into direct conflict with the authorities. He made every effort to undermine the government's scheme of Russification. In 1874 Valančius fell ill and died in Kaunas on May 29, 1875. He was interred in the crypt of the Kaunas Cathedral Basilica.

== Legacy ==
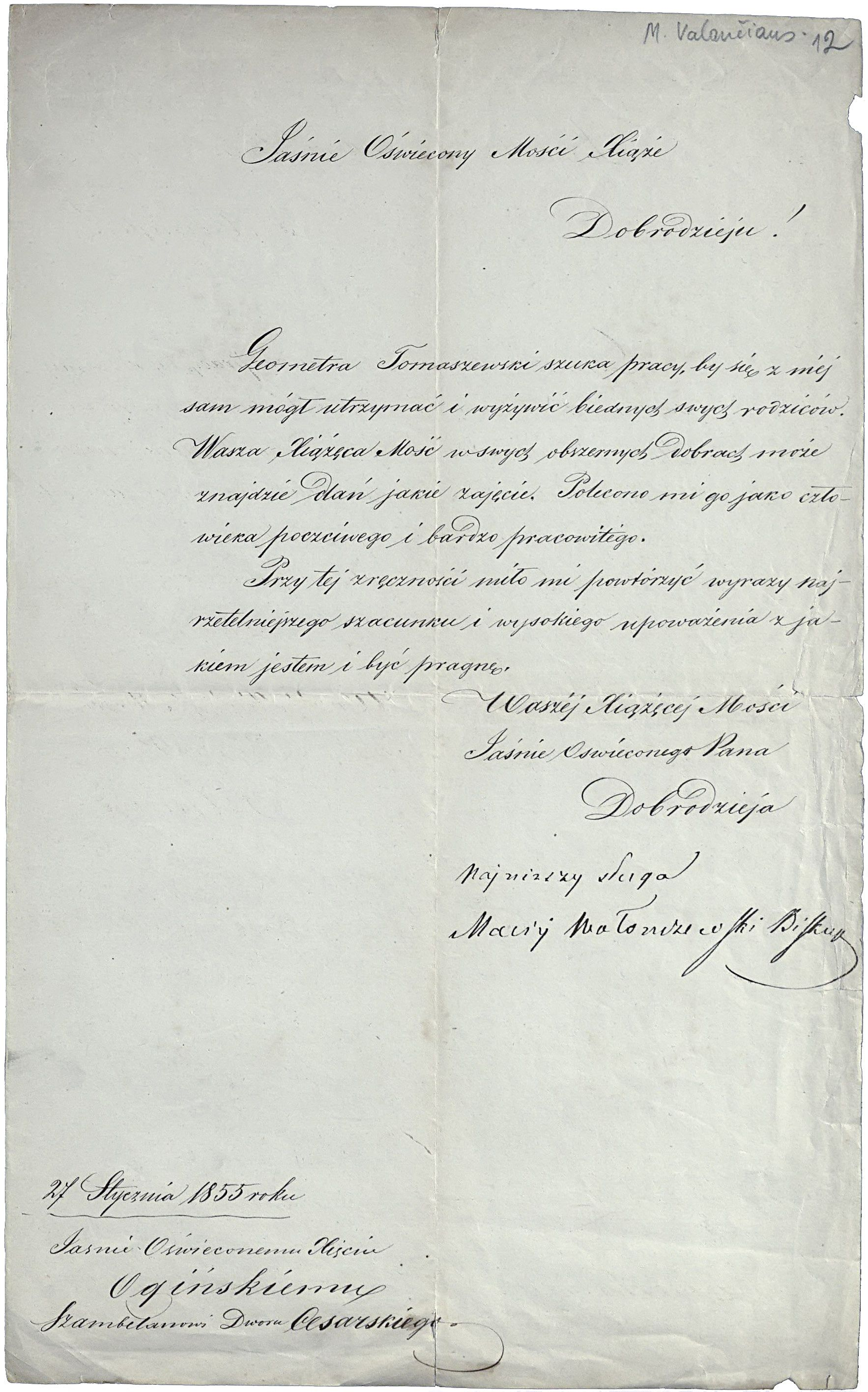
Letter of bishop Motiejus Valančius to prince Ogiński

His services to the Lithuanian cause were lasting and important, including his opposition to the Russian government and the tactics he employed in resisting its policies, particularly the Lithuanian press ban. He sponsored the illegal practice of printing Lithuanian books in East Prussia and smuggling them into Lithuania by knygnešiai, which served to stimulate the emergence of the Lithuanian national movement. As an educator, able Church administrator, historian and ethnographer, and talented writer, Valančius is one of the most versatile and influential figures in 19th-century Lithuania.

He published several dozen books, in Lithuanian, on Lithuanian and Samogitian history, primarily religious and folklore; among them:

- Achievements of the Lithuanian Highlanders and Lowlanders (1845)
- Žemaičių vyskupija (1846; lit. 'Bishopric of Samogitia')
- Žyvatai šventųjų (2 vols., 1858–1868; lit. 'Lives of the Saints')
- Proverbs of the Samogitians (1867)
- Palangos Juzė (1869)
- The Tale of Antano Tretininko (1872)

In addition, he left behind a number of manuscripts, written in Polish, in the nature of memoirs and diaries:

- Rozmaite wiadomości zebrane przez ks. Macieja Wołonczewskiego (1839–1843; lit. 'Miscellaneous news collected by Rev. Maciej Wołonczewski')
- Rozmaite wiadomości zebrane (1843–1857; lit. 'Miscellaneous collected news')
- Rozmaite wiadomości (1858–1859; lit. 'Miscellaneous news')
- Diariusz zdrowia mego (1856–1871; lit. 'Diary of my health')
- Pamiętnik domowy (1858?–1873; lit. 'Domestic Diary')
- Wiadomości o czynnościach pasterskich biskupa Macieja Wołonczewskiego (1850–1875; lit. 'News of the pastoral activities of Bishop Maciej Wołonczewski')

These latter notes were not intended for publication by the author. However, they were published in the original Polish and Lithuanian translation in 2003 by Lithuanian historian Aldona Prašmantáitė. They are an important source for learning about the situation of the Catholic Church in Samogitia under Russian rule, as well as for learning about the Polish language of the region.

== Sources ==
- Sawaniewska-Mochowa, Zofia (2013). ""Zapiski domowe" biskupa Macieja Wołonczewskiego jako przyczynek do poznania sytuacji społecznej i językowej na terenie dawnego Wielkiego Księstwa Litewskiego pod władzą carów". Acta Baltico-Slavica. 37.
- Sužiedėlis, Simas (1978). "Encyclopedia Lituanica", vol. VI. Boston: Juozas Kapočius.

Catholic Church titles
| Preceded by Szymon Mikołaj Giedroyć | Bishop of Samogitia; 1849–1875 | Succeeded by Aleksandras Beresnevičius |
