= Lithuanian dictionaries =

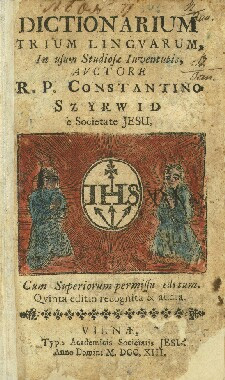
First Lithuanian-language dictionary

Dictionaries of Lithuanian language have been printed since the first half of the 17th century.

== History ==
The first Lithuanian language dictionary was compiled by Konstantinas Sirvydas and printed in 1629 as a trilingual (Polish–Latin–Lithuanian) dictionary. Five editions of it were printed until 1713, but it was used and copied by other lexicographers until the 19th century.

The first German–Lithuanian–German dictionary, to address the necessities of Lithuania Minor, was published by Friedrich W. Haack in 1730. A better German–Lithuanian–German dictionary, with a sketch of grammar and history of the language, more words, and systematic orthography, was published by Philipp Ruhig in 1747. In 1800, Christian Gottlieb Mielcke printed an expanded and revised version of Ruhig's dictionary. Its foreword was the last work of Immanuel Kant printed during his life.

There also existed a number of notable unpublished dictionaries.

At the beginning of the 19th century linguists recognized the conservative character of Lithuanian, and it came into the focus of the comparative linguistics of Indo-European languages. To address the needs of linguists, Georg H. F. Nesselmann published a Lithuanian–German dictionary in 1851.

The culmination of Lithuanian linguists' efforts is the 20-volume Academic Dictionary of Lithuanian.

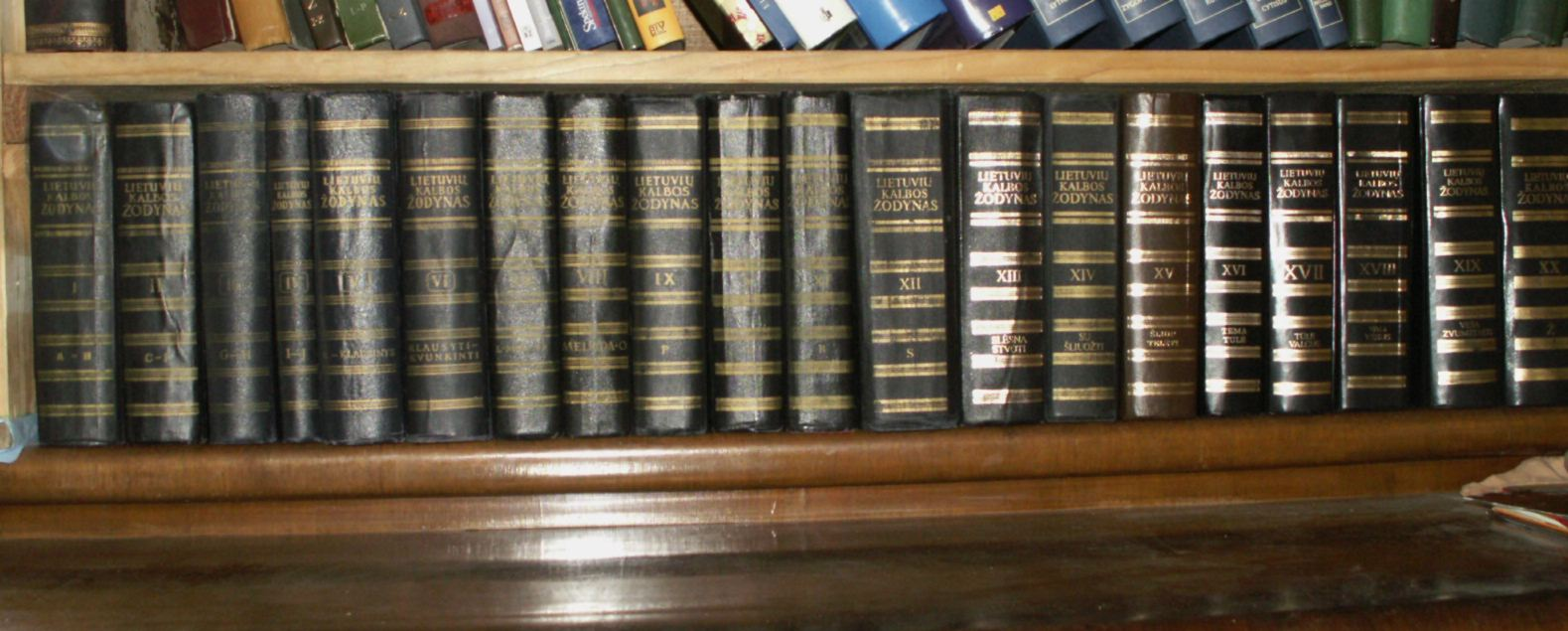
20 volumes of the Academic Dictionary of Lithuanian
