= Academic Dictionary of Lithuanian =

Dictionary of the Lithuanian language

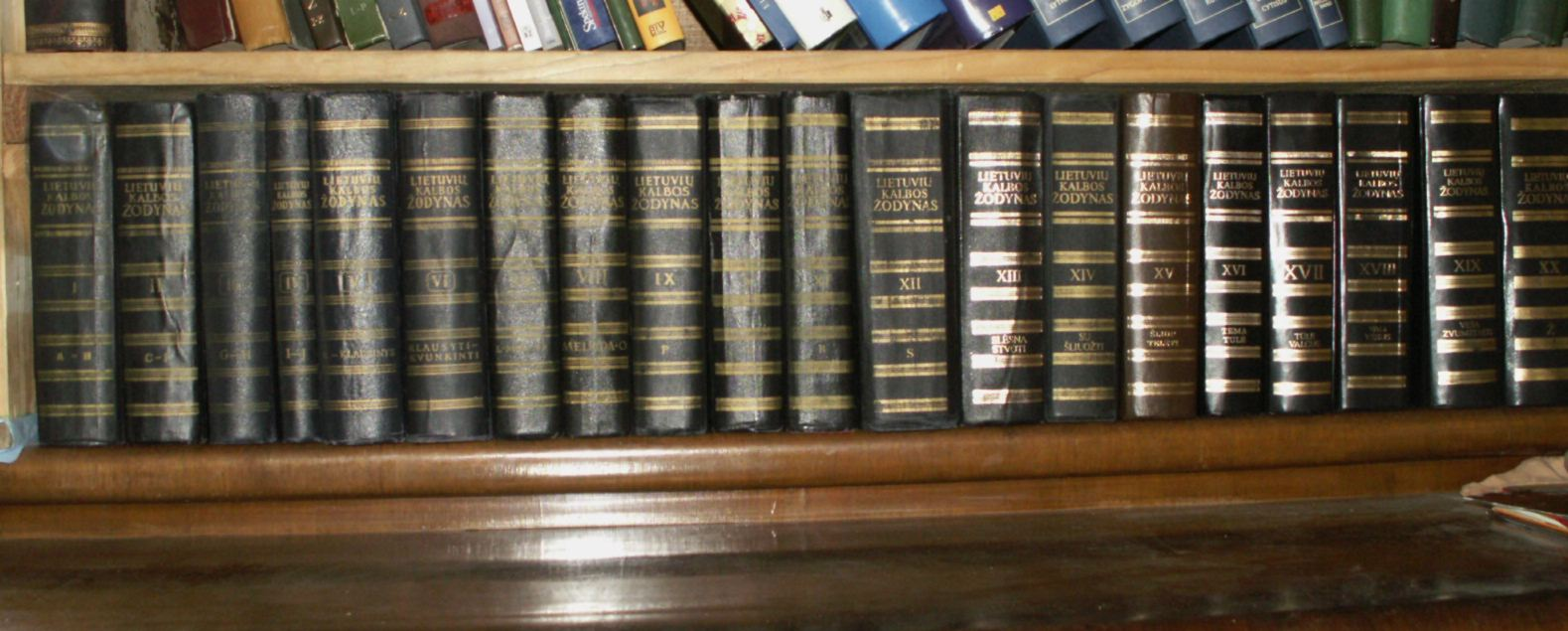
20 volumes of the Academic Dictionary of Lithuanian

The Academic Dictionary of Lithuanian (Lithuanian: Didysis lietuvių kalbos žodynas or Akademinis lietuvių kalbos žodynas) is a comprehensive thesaurus of the Lithuanian language and one of the most extensive lexicographical works in the world. The 20 volumes encompassing 22,000 pages were published between 1941 and 2002 by the Institute of the Lithuanian Language. An online and a CD version was made available in 2005. It contains about 236,000 headwords, or 500,000 if counting sub-headwords, reflecting modern and historical language both from published texts since the first published book in 1547 until 2001 and recorded from the vernacular. Definitions, usage notes, and examples are given for most words. The entry length varies from one sentence to almost a hundred pages. For example, 46 pages are devoted to 298 different meanings of taisyti (to fix) and its derivatives.

== History ==
Lithuanian philologist Kazimieras Būga started collecting material for a dictionary in 1902. When he returned from Russia to Lithuania in 1920, he started writing a dictionary that would contain all known Lithuanian words as well as hydronyms, toponyms, and surnames. However, he died in 1924 having published only two fascicules with a lengthy introduction and the dictionary up to the word anga. Būga attempted to write down everything that was known to science about each word, including etymology and history. He was critical of his own efforts realizing that the dictionary was not comprehensive or consistent, and considered the publication to be only a "draft" of a better dictionary in the future.

Būga collected about 600,000 index cards with words, but Juozas Balčikonis, who was selected by the Ministry of Education to continue the work on the dictionary in 1930, realized that more data is needed and organized a campaign to collect additional words from literary works as well as the spoken language. The focus was on older texts, mostly ignoring contemporary literature and periodicals. Balčikonis asked Lithuanian public (teachers, students, etc.) to record words from the spoken language. Thus, the dictionary was substantially revised and reworked. The revised dictionary excluded proper nouns, infrequently used barbarisms, etymological and historical notes. The words were now explained only in Lithuanian. Būga used to leave the explanation in the language that it was originally recorded; therefore the words could be explained in German, Russian, Polish or even Latin.

The first volume covering letters A and B was published in 1941, i.e. during the occupation by Nazi Germany. The second volume (letters C through F) was published in 1947. These two volumes were attacked by the communists as the words and sample sentences reflected "reactionary clerical phraseology" and not the "Lithuanian revolutionary press and the present Soviet Socialist reality." Balčikonis was removed as the chief editor. It took nine years to revise the dictionary and publish the 3rd volume in 1956. This and subsequent volumes feature numerous quotes from the Lithuanian translations of the works of Lenin, Marx, Engels, Stalin and other Lithuanian communist texts. The first two volumes were also revised and republished based on these new standards in 1968–1969.

With the Perestroika and Lithuania's independence in 1990, Soviet and communist examples were discarded. Examples were added from religious texts and from texts by Lithuanian linguists who retreated west from the approaching Red Army in 1944. The final volume of the dictionary was published in 2002. In total, the dictionary was written by 69 and edited by 23 linguists.

== Sources ==
The dictionary was written based on words collected and written down on index cards. The main card index contains 4.5 million cards. The supplemental index contains 0.5 million cards with words that were collected after the corresponding volume of the dictionary was printed. These cards were collected from a great variety of sources – almost 1,000 written sources (both unpublished and published) and more than 500 Lithuanian settlements.

The card index dates back to 1902 when Kazimieras Būga decided to record words not in notebooks but on index cards. The first words were written down from the works of Simonas Daukantas and collections of Kazimieras Jaunius as well as words collected by Būga near Dusetos. He continued to collect further words from works of Lithuanian literature (e.g. works by Motiejus Valančius), Lithuanian dictionaries (e.g. dictionary of Antanas Juška), collections of other linguists (e.g. 10,000 words from Jonas Jablonskis), as well as from the spoken language of the people. Būga's card index grew from about 150,000 cards in 1920 to 600,000 cards in 1923.

Juozas Balčikonis realized that the index was not comprehensive and organized a wide effort to collect more words. He encouraged members of the intelligentsia, teachers, even students to submit cards with new words, particularly from the living dialects of the village. The card index was further expanded by words from old Lithuanian texts (e.g. bibles of Samuel Bogusław Chyliński and Jonas Bretkūnas), old Lithuanian dictionaries (e.g. by Konstantinas Sirvydas, Philipp Ruhig, Friedrich Kurschat), Lithuanian literature (e.g. works by Vincas Kudirka, Antanas Baranauskas, Maironis, Žemaitė, Juozas Tumas-Vaižgantas, Vincas Krėvė, Petras Cvirka), collections of Lithuanian folklore (e.g. by Antanas Juška and Jonas Basanavičius). The index grew rapidly; for example, 78,774 cards were collected in 1933 and 97,930 cards in 1940. Over a decade, the index grew by about 1 million cards.

After World War II, the card index was expanded by adding Soviet and communist terminology as well as international words. From 1963, editors of the dictionary organized expeditions to different regions of Lithuania to collect words from the spoken language.

The cards were provided by numerous people of different educational background. Some of the prominent figures who contributed to the card index include Presidents of Lithuania Kazys Grinius and Antanas Smetona, archbishop Jurgis Matulaitis-Matulevičius, ophthalmologist Petras Avižonis, and many others. A list of more than 500 contributors who provided 100 or more words was published in the last 20th volume.

== Chief editors ==
The chief editors of the dictionary were:

- Juozas Balčikonis (Vols. 1–2 in 1930–1950)
- Kazys Ulvydas (Vols. 3–5 in 1956–1959, and Vols. 11–16 in 1978–1995)
- Jonas Kruopas (Vols. 6–10 in 1962–1976, and republished Vols. 1–2 in 1968–1969)
- Vytautas Vitkauskas (Vols. 17–20 in 1996–2002).

== See also ==
- Lithuanian dictionaries
- List of dictionaries by number of words
