= Philipp Ruhig =

Lithuanian Lutheran priest and philosopher

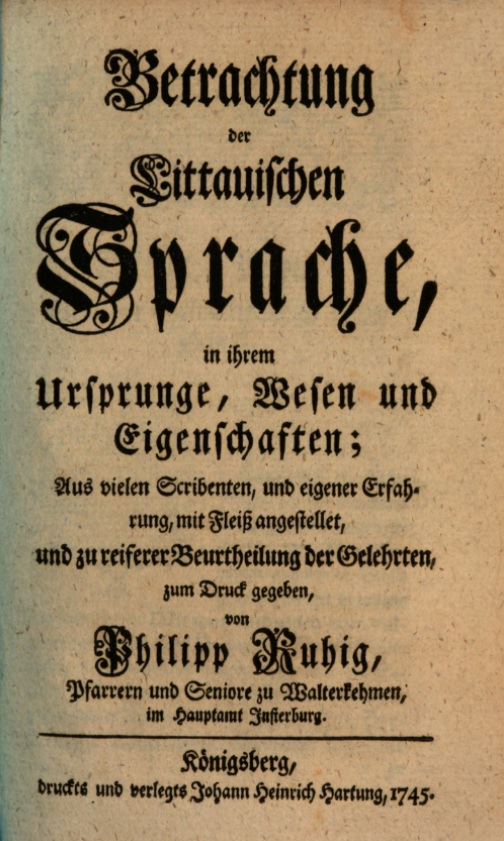
Title page of a book Betrachtung der littauischen Sprache in ihrem Ursprunge, Wesen und Eigenschaften (English: Consideration of the Lithuanian language in its origin, essence and properties) by Philipp Ruhig, published in Königsberg, 1745

Philipp Ruhig (Lithuanian: Pilypas Ruigys, Latin: Philippus Ruhigius) (March 31, 1675, Kattenau — June 4, 1749) was a Lithuanian Lutheran priest from East Prussia mostly known as a philosopher and philologist, an early expert in Lithuanian language.

== Major works ==
- 1745: "Betrachtung der Littauischen Sprache, in ihrem Ursprunge, Wesen und Eigenschaften"
- 1747: "Littauisch-Deutschen und Deutsch-Littauischen Lexicon"
