= Compendium Grammaticae Lithvanicae =

1673 book about grammar of the Lithuanian language

Compendium Grammaticæ Lithvanicæ
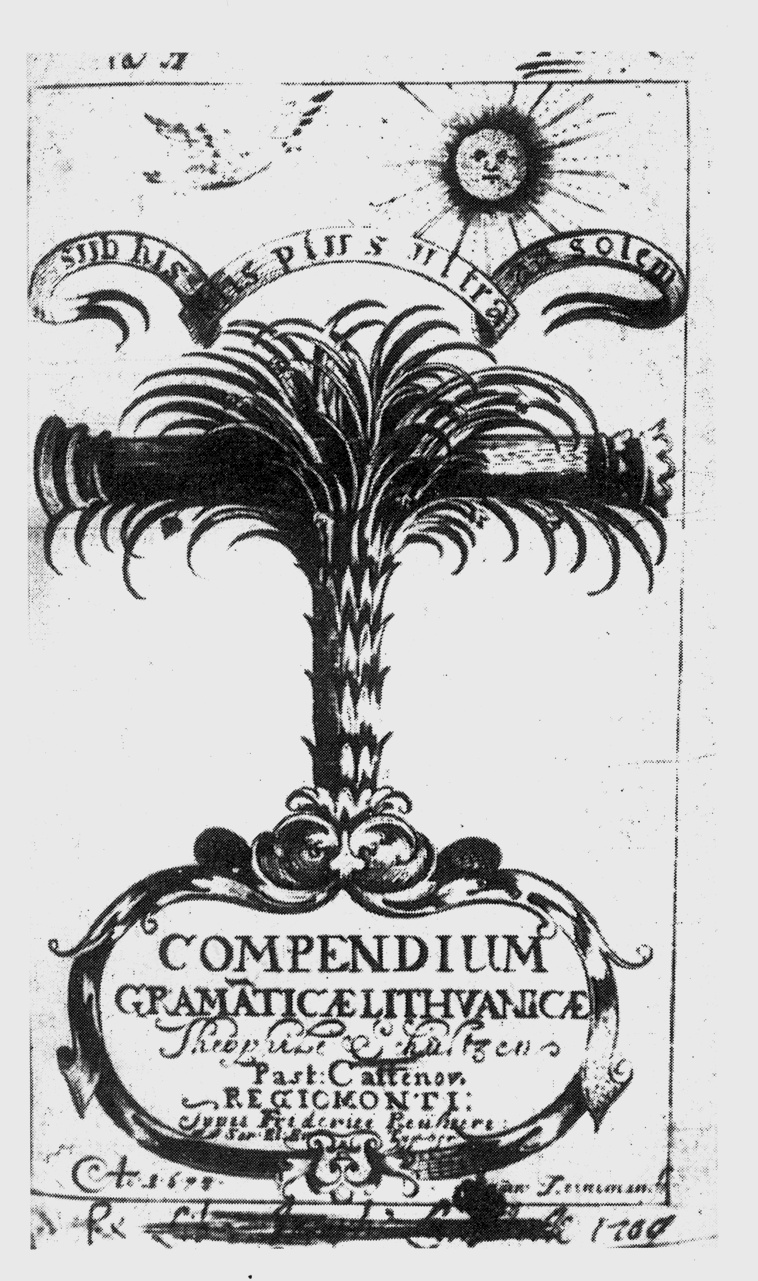
- Title page of the book
- Author: Christophorus Sapphun, Theophylus Gottlieb Schultz
- Language: Latin
- Subject: Lithuanian grammar
- Genre: Educational book of the Lithuanian language grammar
- Published: 1673
- Publication place: Duchy of Prussia

Compendium Grammaticæ Lithvanicæ (Lithuanian: Lietuvių kalbos gramatikos sąvadas; English: Compendium of the Lithuanian Grammar) is a prescriptive printed grammar of the Lithuanian language, which was one of the first attempts to standardize the Lithuanian language. The grammar was intended for pastors who knew little or no Lithuanian so that they could learn the language and communicate with their Lithuanian-speaking parishioners.

While the book's manuscript was completed by Christophorus Sapphun in c. 1643, the published version dates to 1673. It was published and apparently edited by Theophylus Gottlieb Schultz, one of Sapphun's students. The book distinguished three dialects of the Lithuanian language: Samogitian dialect (Latin: Samogitiæ) of Samogitia, Royal Lithuania (Latin: Lithvaniæ Regalis) and Ducal Lithuania (Latin: Lithvaniæ Ducalis). The book reports that the Lithuanians of the Vilnius Region (Latin: in tractu Vilnensi) tend to speak harshly, comparing their "harsh" dialect to the "harsh" dialects of the German language which were used by the Austrians and the Bavarians .

== Authorship ==
The initial Latin version of the Compendium Grammaticæ Lithvanicæ was written by Christophorus Sapphun in c. 1643, however the edited version was published by Theophylus Gottlieb Schultz in Königsberg in 1673. The preface of the Compendium Grammaticæ Lithvanicæ contains indication that it is the work of Schultz's teacher Sapphun, however on the title page Schultz indicated his surname, therefore it is believed that he edited Sapphun's manuscript.

It is from a similar period as Daniel Klein's Grammatica Litvanica, published in 1653, which is regarded as the first prescriptive printed grammar of the Lithuanian language. However, the philologists concluded that the foundations of the Compendium Grammaticæ Lithvanicæ and the Grammatica Litvanica grammars were laid by their authors independently of each other and that coincidences could have appeared later during the editing process of those grammars.

== Content ==
The Compendium Grammaticæ Lithvanicæ contains eight chapters: the first is about the spelling and phonetics, the second and eighth are about prosody, the third is about nouns (nouns, adjectives, numerals), the fourth is about pronouns, the fifth is about verbs and participles, the sixth is about intransitive parts of speech, and the seventh is about syntax. Most of the examples given in the book are with Lithuanian endings (e.g. names Jonas = Jonas, Jonuttis = Jonutis, etc.), therefore it allows to highlight the tendency of spelling the endings of words in the Old Lithuanian writings.

The authors of the Compendium Grammaticæ Lithvanicæ removed letters f, h, x from the Lithuanian alphabet, but included letters j, ů, and letter y was moved to the end of the alphabet, according to the Latin alphabet tradition.

Compendium Grammaticæ Lithvanicæ distinguished three dialects of the Lithuanian language: Samogitian dialect (Latin: Samogitiæ) of Samogitia, Royal Lithuania (Latin: Lithvaniæ Regalis) and Ducal Lithuania (Latin: Lithvaniæ Ducalis). The Ducal Lithuanian language is described as pure (Latin: Pura), half-Samogitian (Latin: SemiSamogitizans) and having elements of the Curonian language (Latin: Curonizans). The authors of the Compendium Grammaticæ Lithvanicæ singled out that the Lithuanians of the Vilnius Region (Latin: in tractu Vilnensi) tend to speak harshly, almost like Austrians, Bavarians and others speak German in Germany.

== Extant copies ==
To this day, only three copies of the Compendium Grammaticæ Lithvanicæ are known. They are kept in Kraków (one in the Jagiellonian Library and another in the Czartoryski funds of the National Museum of Poland) and in Saint Petersburg (one in the National Library of Russia).

== See also ==
- Grammatica Litvanica – the first printed grammar of the Lithuanian language, printed in 1653
- Universitas lingvarum Litvaniae – the oldest surviving grammar of the Lithuanian language published in the territory of the Grand Duchy of Lithuania
- Mokslas skaitymo rašto lietuviško – the first Catholic primer of the Lithuanian language
- Catechism of Martynas Mažvydas – the first printed book in the Lithuanian language, printed in 1547
- Postil of Jonas Bretkūnas – collection of sermons and Bible commentaries published in 1591
- Catechism of Mikalojus Daukša – the first Lithuanian Roman Catholic catechism published in 1595
- Catechism of Merkelis Petkevičius – the first Lithuanian Protestant (Calvinist) catechism published in the Grand Duchy of Lithuania in 1598
