= 1595 in literature =

This article is a summary of the literary events and publications of 1595.

== Events ==
- May 24 – The Nomenclator of Leiden University Library appears as the first printed catalog of an institutional library.
- December 9 – Shakespeare's Richard II is possibly acted privately at the Canon Row house of Sir Edward Hoby, with Sir Robert Cecil attending.
- unknown dates
  - The first part of Ginés Pérez de Hita's Historia de los bandos de los Zegríes y Abencerrajes (Guerras civiles de Granada) appears. Supposedly a chronicle of the Morisco rebellions in Granada based on an Arabic original, it is probably the earliest historical novel and certainly the first to gain popularity.
  - Lope de Vega leaves the service of the Duke of Alba and returns to Madrid, after the death of his first wife Isabel in the previous year.

== New books ==
=== Prose ===
- Mikalojus Daukša – Kathechismas, arba Mokslas kiekvienam krikščioniui privalus
- Justus Lipsius – De militia romana
- Nicholas Remy – Daemonolatreiae libri tres
- Sir Philip Sidney (posthumous, written 1580–83) – An Apology for Poetry
- Vincentio Saviolo – His practise, in two bookes. (first manual of fencing in English)
- Fausto Veranzio – Dictionarium quinque nobilissimarum Europæ linguarum, Latinæ, Italicæ, Germanicæ, Dalmatiæ, & Vngaricæ published in Latin in Venice
- Joseph of Anchieta – Arte de gramática da língua mais usada na costa do Brasil
- Anonymous (possibly Valens Acidalius) – Disputatio nova contra mulieres

=== Drama ===
- Anonymous – Locrine (published claiming to be revised by "W. S.")
- Jakob Ayrer – Von der Erbauung Roms (Of the Building of Rome)
- Gervase Markham – The Most Honorable Tragedy of Sir Richard Grinville
- Antoine de Montchrestien – Sophonisbe
- Robert Wilson? – The Pedlers Prophecie
- Approximate year
  - William Alabaster, Roxana
  - William Shakespeare, Richard II
    - Romeo and Juliet
    - A Midsummer Night's Dream

=== Poetry ===
- Barnabe Barnes – A Divine Century of Spiritual Sonnets
- Richard Barnfield – Cynthia
- Thomas Campion – Poemata
- George Chapman (anonymous) – Ovid's Banquet of Sense
- Gervase Markham – The Poem of Poems, or Syon's Muse
- Robert Southwell (anonymous) – Saint Peter's Complaint
- Edmund Spenser
  - Amoretti and Epithalamion ("written not long since")
  - Colin Clouts Come Home Againe

== Births ==
- March 21 – Ferdinando Ughelli, Italian church historian (died 1670)
- before June – Thomas Carew, English poet (died 1640)
- October 18 – Edward Winslow, English theologian, pamphleteer and New England politician (died 1655)
- December 4 – Jean Chapelain, French poet and critic (died 1674)
- Unknown dates
  - Bihari Lal, Hindi poet (died 1663)
  - Jean Desmarets, French writer and dramatist (died 1676)
  - Juan Eusebio Nieremberg, Spanish Jesuit writer and mystic (died 1658)

== Deaths ==
- February – William Painter, English translator (born c. 1540)
- February 21 – Robert Southwell, English poet and Catholic martyr (born c. 1561)
- March 18 – Jean de Sponde, French poet (born 1557)
- April 25 – Torquato Tasso, Italian poet (born 1544)
- May 25 – Valens Acidalius, German poet and critic writing in Latin (born 1567)
- June 23 – Louis Carrion, Flemish scholar (born 1547)
- October 5 – Faizi, Indian poet and scholar (born 1547)
- November 5 – Luis Barahona de Soto, Spanish poet 1548)
