= Postil of Mikalojus Daukša =

1599 collection of sermons and Bible commentaries

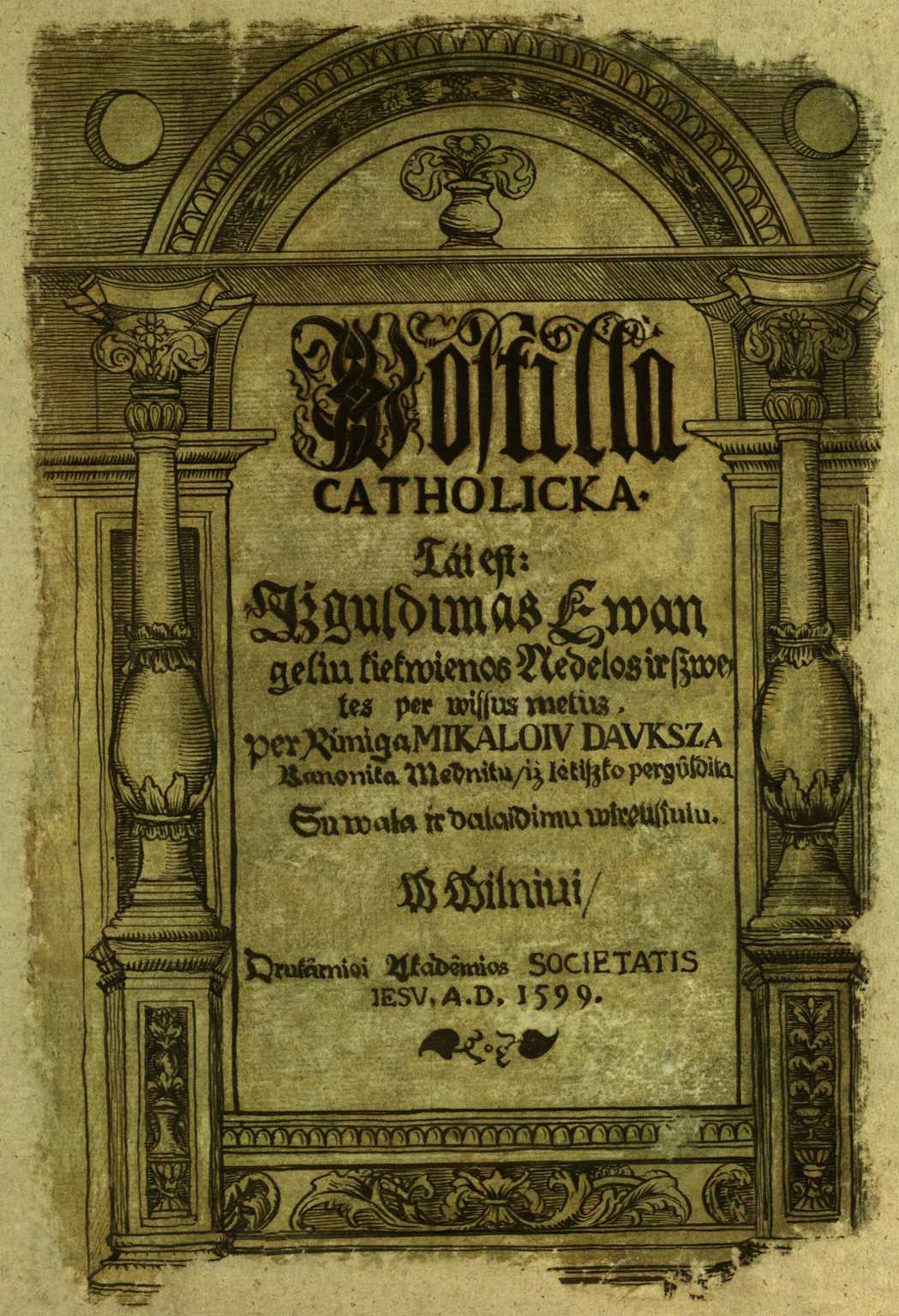
Title page of the Catholic Postil

The Catholic Postil, That Is an Exegesis of the Gospels for Every Week and Feast of the Entire Year (modern Lithuanian: Postila katolicka, tai esti išguldymas evangelijų kiekvienos nedėlios ir šventės per visus metus, original Lithuanian: Postilla catholicka, tái est Ižguldimas ewangeliu kiekwienos nedelos ir szwętes per wissús metús) was a collection of Roman Catholic sermons and Bible commentaries (postil) by Jakub Wujek translated from Polish to Lithuanian by Mikalojus Daukša and first published in 1599. It was one of the first Lithuanian-language texts published in the Grand Duchy of Lithuania. The work is valued by researchers for the purity of the Lithuanian language and for its Polish dedication that defended the use of the Lithuanian language in public life. The 646-page postil remained the longest Lithuanian published work until the 19th century.

== Publication history ==
=== First publication ===
After the Council of Trent (1545–1563), the Roman Catholic Church published religious texts in native languages to combat the Protestant Reformation. Lutheran pastor Jonas Bretkūnas published his Lithuanian postil in the Duchy of Prussia in 1591 prompting Lithuanian Catholics into action. Jakub Wujek, rector of the Jesuit Academy in Vilnius, published two postils in Polish – a larger one in 1573–1575 and a smaller in 1579–1580. The large postil was aimed at well educated clergy and delved into theological arguments by various Christian sects. The smaller postil was aimed at an average priest. It was not a summary of the larger postil, but a brand new work that used various texts by other authors, including Louis of Granada, Johann Wild (Ferus), Johann Eck, Johann Augustanus Faber, etc. Wujek's postils were an answer to a Protestant postil of Mikołaj Rej published in 1557.

Lithuanian priest Mikalojus Daukša translated the smaller postil into Lithuanian. He used the 2nd edition of the Polish postil and later added details from the 3rd edition which was published in 1590 in Kraków. Several times, the text refers to Pope Gregory XIII, who died in 1585, as the current pope though the text was given to the printing press of the Jesuit Academy in Vilnius in early 1595 (though, due to financial difficulties, it was not published until 1599). At the time, 500 copies of books were usually published but it is very possible that more copies of the Catholic Postil were published to compete with the Protestant Postil of Jonas Bretkūnas. After translating the postil, Daukša also translated Catechism, or Education Obligatory to Every Christian but it was published first in 1595 as it was a much smaller and less expensive work.

=== Surviving copies ===
Eight original postils survive. They are kept at the Vilnius University Library (3 copies), National Martynas Mažvydas Library, Institute of Lithuanian Literature and Folklore, Göttingen State and University Library, Library of the Russian Academy of Sciences, and Vatican Library. The Vatican copy was gifted to Pope Pius XI by President Antanas Smetona in May 1930.

=== Academic reprints ===
Excerpts from the Catholic Postil by Daukša were first republished in 1823 in Vilnius. It was two short booklets (25 pages and 16 pages) believed to have been prepared by Simonas Stanevičius to showcase the beauty and lexical richness of the Lithuanian language and to encourage its development and use. The first Lithuanian translation of the Polish dedication to the reader was published in Varpas in 1900. In the 19th century, Daukša and his texts became firmly established as key developments in the history of the Lithuanian language and started attracting academic interest.

Stanevičius and later bishop Motiejus Valančius raised the issue of republishing the Catholic Postil in full, but the work was started by Eduards Volters only in 1898. The first two sections were published in 1904 and 1909. The third section was almost complete, but the outbreak of World War I prevented its publication. Volters managed to convince the Soviet Union to complete the third section and it was published in 1927. In total, 456 pages (out of 628) of the original postil were published.

In 1926, a photocopy of the postil was published by Mykolas Biržiška. In 1977, the Polish linguist Czesław Kudzinowski published a two-volume Indeks-słownik do Daukšos Postile which alphabetically indexes all Lithuanian words and their forms in the postil and provides their Polish equivalent in Wujek's postil. A new publication of the postil alongside the Polish original was prepared by Jonas Palionis and published in 2000.

== Content ==
Measuring at 31 by 20 centimetres (12.2 in × 7.9 in), Catholic Postil has a total of 646 pages: 8 pages of dedications written by Daukša, 630 pages of translated sermons (the printed book marks only 627 pages due to some numbering errors), 6 pages of erratum, and 2 pages of covers. Some surviving copies of the book have an image of the coat of arms (a rose from the Poraj coat of arms) of Merkelis Giedraitis, the Bishop of Samogitia and sponsor of the postil, with a Latin quatrain about it as well as an eight-line dedication to Giedraitis. The dedication was written by Vaclovas Daujotas from Labūnava.

=== Latin dedication ===
Daukša added two dedications, one in Latin to his benefactor Giedraitis and another in Polish to the reader. The Latin dedication survives in only one copy of the book which was kept by the Kražiai College and Simonas Stanevičius. It is dated 1 March 1599. It is a panegyric work that praises Bishop Merkelis but, unlike many such works, does not portray excessive humility on Daukša's part. Instead, the dedication makes references to "our" work and compares Daukša to Orpheus. Even though both Merkelis and Daukša were members of the clergy, the dedication does not reference the Bible or the popes and instead draws parallels with the Classical Antiquity.

Overall, the dedication shows clear influence of classical authors, primarily Cicero. Daukša praises Merkelis' work and accomplishments and states that he will earn gratitude from the homeland for his dedication, from the clergy for making their work easier, from the people for their salvation, and from others for saving the native language from abandonment and perish. Those "others" have been interpreted to refer to the Protestants showcasing Daukša's tolerance and concern for the Lithuanian language which surpassed religious differences. Overall, the dedication is condensed, without unnecessary drivel, and is one of the better examples of such works.

=== Polish dedication ===
The postil is mainly known and valued for its Polish dedication to the reader which is part of the secondary school curriculum in Lithuania. The dedication is a passionate and patriotic defense of the native language which is considered to be the key to the survival of the nation. Daukša claims that all nations have three things in common – ancestral land, traditions, and language. Significantly, Daukša does not emphasize social class or state in his definition of a nation. He wants to see the Lithuanian language preserved, perfected, and enriched and used in churches and state documents – at the time official documents used Church Slavonic, Latin, or Polish.

In his quest to promote the Lithuanian language, unlike many authors of the era, Daukša does not advertise the supposed Lithuanian roots from the Romans (see the Palemonids). It reflects clear ideas of the Renaissance and has been compared to La Défense et illustration de la langue française by Joachim du Bellay. Daukša's declaration about the Lithuanian language resonated with the activists of the 19th-century Lithuanian National Revival who worked to purify and promote the Lithuanian language. The Polish dedication is also a polemic response to some Protestant thesis. For example, he saw language as an element of the human nature and natural law which were divine; the Protestants saw human nature as corrupted by sin and requiring intellectual efforts to improve.

=== Sermons ===
The main content is an example of the Baroque literature though it has some elements of Renaissance in its expressions and form. The main theme is not the love of God, but the wrath of the harsh and vengeful God of the Old Testament. The sermons appeal not to the rational mind but to the emotions striking the fear of God. In a typical Baroque fashion, the sermons frequently discuss the pitiful temporary nature of every material thing, including the human body and life. There is no earthly joy or worthwhile pursuit as death and the Apocalypse will turn everything to dust and rot (cf. memento mori). The end of the world is described particularly vividly and alarmingly.

The sermons are more abstract, looking for hidden meanings in Biblical passages, than dealing with realities of life. The sermons support feudal society and argue for unconditional obedience both to good and bad rulers as both were given their power by God. The text often attacks the Protestants and tries to instill hatred towards them even hinting that the Protestants should be punished and persecuted for their beliefs. Therefore, there is a marked difference between the dedications (Daukša's original works that show clear influence of Renaissance and humanism) and the translated sermons that are more medieval.

== Language ==
The translation was done almost word-by-word without any larger alteration to meaning. It appears that church officials wanted a faithful copy of Wujek's postil which they considered well suited for the Counter-Reformation. Researchers have identified about 200 text deletions but majority of them seem to be mechanical errors. Such rather mechanical approach to translation produced some failed neologisms, introduced barbarisms, and hampered syntax. Some references to "us" as Poles (and not Lithuanians) and to the deceased Pope Gregory XIII as the current pope could be explained by the word-by-word approach to translation.

Nevertheless, the translation is noted for its overall quality and lexical richness. Daukša paid particular attention to provide synonyms to enrich the reader and to appease speakers of different Lithuanian dialects. When a Lithuanian equivalent was not available, Daukša preferred internationalisms based on Latin or Greek over loanwords from Slavic languages. Daukša also invented new Lithuanian words, often by compounding or by adding suffixes or prefixes. A particular challenge were words for abstract concepts (e.g. shame, example, luxury, cause, etc.), but it is hard to determine which were Daukša's neologisms and which were taken from everyday language. He often chose stronger and more expressive words than the Polish original to strengthen the emotional impact, to make the language more dynamic. Daukša borrowed from the spoken language of the people and was not shy to use some coarse language. He aimed the sermons at the poorly educated villagers and tried to use common, everyday language. In the process, some saints or Biblical figures lost some of their otherworldliness and acquired features familiar to local Lithuanians. Both Wujek and Daukša were familiar with the art of rhetoric. Wujek frequently used periodic sentences that Daukša preserved and in some instances improved. Daukša was successful in translating various proverbs, rhyming them or polishing their parallel construction.

The postil was printed in the Gothic script. Daukša borrowed many elements of orthography from the Polish language, for example letters w and ł, but also introduced some innovations, including the ogonek letters į and ų. While these letters are part of the standard modern Lithuanian, they were forgotten and then re-imported from texts published in East Prussia. He used various complex diacritic signs to indicate pronunciation nuances as well as stress. Catholic Postil is the oldest Lithuanian text with stress marks making it particularly interesting to linguists.

== See also ==
- Postil of Jonas Bretkūnas, a Protestant postil published in 1591
- Catechism of Mikalojus Daukša published in 1595

== Bibliography ==
- Girdvainis, Juozas V. (24 September 1939). "Prof. Ed. Volterio lituaniskos darbai" (PDF). Naujoji Romuva (in Lithuanian). 38 (451).
- Gustaitė, Genovaitė (2001). "Apie vatikaniškę M. Daukšos "Postilę" ir A. Smetonos laišką joje" (PDF). Lietuvių katalikų mokslo akademijos metraštis (in Lithuanian). 19. ISSN 1392-0502.
- Gustytė-Ivinskienė, Jurgita (12 October 2019). "Mikalojaus Daukšos "Postilės" kodai". Kalvotoji Žemaitija (in Lithuanian).
- Karaciejus, Juozas (2001). "Recenzija: Mikalojaus Daukšos 1599 metų Postilė ir jos šaltiniai" (PDF). Acta Linguistica Lithuanica (in Lithuanian). XLV. ISSN 1648-4444.
- Koženiauskienė, Regina (1999). "Pavyzdinės kalbos kūrimo intencijos M. Daukšos ir S. Stanevičiaus prakalbose". Baltistica (in Lithuanian). 2 (XXXIV). ISSN 0132-6503.
- Lebedys, Jurgis (1963). "Vujeko Postilės vertimas" (PDF). Mikalojus Daukša (in Lithuanian). Vilnius: Valstybinė grožinės literatūros leidykla. OCLC 1014910303.
- Lebedys, Jurgis (1963a). "Vertimo menas, literatūrinio stiliaus užuomazgos ir įnašas į literatūrinę kalbą" (PDF). Mikalojus Daukša (in Lithuanian). Vilnius: Valstybinė grožinės literatūros leidykla. OCLC 1014910303.
- Lebedys, Jurgis (1977). Senoji lietuvių literatūra (in Lithuanian). Vilnius: Mokslas. OCLC 469279940.
- Patiejūnienė, Eglė (2011–2013). "Nerenesansinė ne Daukšos Postilė". Orbis Lituaniae (in Lithuanian). Vilnius University. Archived from the original on 2019-12-15.
- Pociūtė, Dainora (2000). "Prigimties pančiai ar įstatymų laisvė: kai kurie M. Daukšos Postilės "Prakalbos į malonųjį skaitytoją" aspektai protestantų minties kontekste" (PDF). Literatūra (in Lithuanian). 38 (1). ISSN 0258-0802.
- Speičytė, Brigita (2001). "Mikalojus Daukša lietuvių literatūros moksle". Žemaičių žemė (in Lithuanian). 4: 4–11. ISSN 1392-2610.
- Subačius, Giedrius (2018). "Lietuvių kalba: nepatogus unikalumas" (PDF). Passport: Lietuvos tapatybė: žmonės, istorijos, idėjos (in Lithuanian). Vol. 2. ISBN 978-609-95853-2-1.
- Ulčinaitė, Eugenija (2000). "Mikalojaus Daukšos Postilė: trijų kalbų ir kultūrų sąveika". Literatūra (in Lithuanian). 38 (1). ISSN 0258-0802.
- Urbutis, Vincas (1978). "Czesław Kudzinowski. Indeks-słownik do "Daukšos Postilė". T. 1 (A-N), 2 (O-Ž)". Baltistica (in Lithuanian). 1 (XIV). ISSN 0132-6503.
- Zinkevičius, Zigmas (1988). Lietuvių kalbos istorija (in Lithuanian). Vol. III (Senųjų raštų kalba). Vilnius: Mokslas. ISBN 5-420-00102-0.
- Zinkevičius, Zigmas (1999). "Dėl Mikalojaus Daukšos rašomosios kalbos kilmės". Baltistica (in Lithuanian). 2 (XXXIV). ISSN 0132-6503.
