= Grammatica Litvanica =

1653 book about grammar of the Lithuanian language

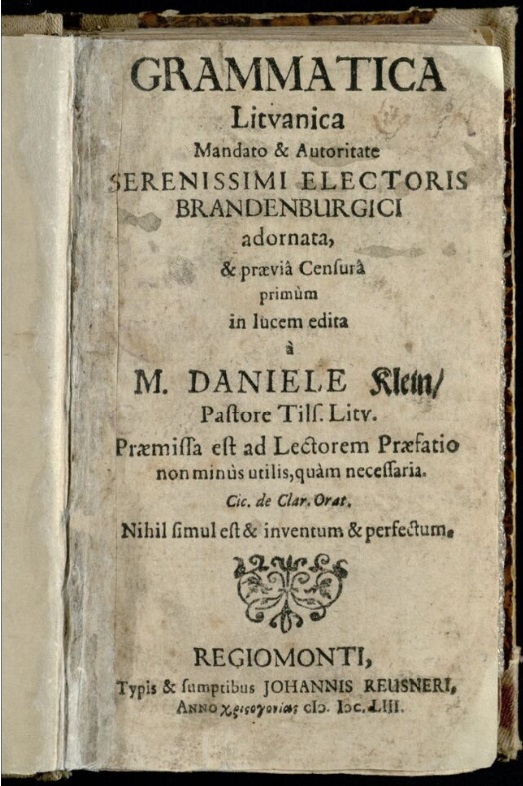
- Title page of the first edition
- Author: Daniel Klein
- Language: Mostly in Latin, partly in Lithuanian, German, Polish
- Subject: Grammar
- Published: 1653
- Publisher: Johann Reusner in Königsberg
- Publication place: Duchy of Prussia
- Media type: Print
- Pages: 205
- OCLC: 164636567

Grammatica Litvanica (Lithuanian: Lietuvių kalbos gramatika, lit. 'Lithuanian grammar') is the first prescriptive printed grammar of the Lithuanian language which was written by Daniel Klein in Latin and published in 1653 in Königsberg, Duchy of Prussia.

The book was published by Johann Reusner who had settled in Königsberg back in 1639, while the editing of the manuscript was entrusted to the priest Johann Lehmann. Lehmann had served in the Lithuanian churches in Klaipėda. The book follows then-traditional grammar schemes for studies in Latin, Greek and Hebrew. The lexical material is taken primarily from the Lithuanian vernacular of the 17th century, with Klein trying to prove that the Lithuanian language can have its own grammar. Klein was also trying to convince Frederick William, Elector of Brandenburg and the Prussian authorities to enable the publication of Lithuanian books.

Under the influence of Klein's efforts to systematically describe the grammatical structure of the Lithuanian language for the first time in his various works, more stable general language norms were introduced into Lithuanian. The new norms were based on the dialect of Western Aukštaitians (English: Western Highlanders).

== Overview ==
The Grammatica Litvanica was printed in 1653 by Johann Reusner who arrived to Königsberg from Rostock in 1639. The checking of the manuscript of the Grammatica Litvanica was entrusted to Johann Lehmann, a priest of Lithuanian churches in Klaipėda. The Grammatica Litvanica mostly follows the traditional Latin grammarians scheme (also in some parts Greek and Hebrew grammars) while the lexical material was taken from the living Lithuanian language and writings. With this work Klein sought to prove that the Lithuanian language can also have its own grammar.

The dedication of the book contains emphasis that Duke Friedrich Wilhelm and the Prussian authorities takes care of publishing of the Lithuanian books. The preface of the book contains Klein's expression of gratitude for his helpers, described as great connoisseurs of the Lithuanian language: Didieji Rudupėnai (German: Enzuhnen) priest Kristupas (Kristoforas) Sapūnas, Katnava priest Johann Klein, Ragainė priest Johan Hurtel, Žiliai (German: Szillen; Russian: Жилино, romanized: Zhilino) priest Friedrich Prätorius, Klaipėda priest Johann Lehmann, Verdainė (now part of the city of Šilutė) priest Vilhelmas Martinijus. The preface also contains criticism of those who opposed the Klein's grammar and did not believe in his work:

However, we cannot avoid the envy and slander of ill-wishers. There are those who, having appropriated the censor's rod, rashly judge our works (...) But slanderers and moths have a natural desire to sting a high thing with low poison. Such are those people that they never feel so happy when they can insult a well-deserved good name. Jealous people, what you are doing!

In 1654 Klein wrote a German-language summary of the Grammatica Litvanica titled Compendium Litvanico-Germanicum, oder Kurtz und gantz deutliche Anführung zur Littauischen Sprache wie man recht Littauisch lesen/schreiben und reden sol. (transl. Compendium Litvanico-Germanicum, or Short and clear introduction to the Lithuanian language on how to read/write and speak Lithuanian properly.) for the less educated Prussian officials.

== Impact ==
The distinctive Lithuanian letter Ė was used for the first time in the Klein's Grammatica Litvanica and firmly established itself in the Lithuanian language; it is still in use today. In the Grammatica Litvanica Klein also established the use of the letter ⟨W⟩ for marking the sound [v], the use of which was later abolished in the Lithuanian language in favor of ⟨V⟩.

The Grammatica Litvanica and other grammars written by Klein had great significance for the development of Lithuanian linguistics as they systematically described the grammatical structure of the Lithuanian language for the first time, and established more stable general language norms, based on the dialect of Western Aukštaitians (English: Western Highlanders).

== An unpublished Lithuanian grammar from the 1640s and the different methods of the two authors ==
In 1643 Christophorus Sapphun wrote the Lithuanian grammar Compendium Grammaticae Lithvanicae slightly earlier than Klein, however the edited variant of Sapūnas's grammar was published only in 1673 by Theophylus Gottlieb Schultz. Despite the similar periods of publishing, philologists conclude that the foundations of the Grammatica Litvanica and the Compendium Grammaticae Lithvanicae grammars were laid by their authors independently of each other and that coincidences could have appeared later during the editing process of those grammars.

== See also ==
- Universitas lingvarum Litvaniae – the oldest surviving grammar of the Lithuanian language published in the territory of the Grand Duchy of Lithuania
- Mokslas skaitymo rašto lietuviško – the first Catholic primer of the Lithuanian language
- Catechism of Martynas Mažvydas – the first printed book in the Lithuanian language, printed in 1547
- Postil of Jonas Bretkūnas – collection of sermons and Bible commentaries published in 1591
- Catechism of Mikalojus Daukša – the first Lithuanian Roman Catholic catechism published in 1595
- Catechism of Merkelis Petkevičius – the first Lithuanian Protestant (Calvinist) catechism published in the Grand Duchy of Lithuania in 1598
