= Horestes =

1567 morality play by John Pickering

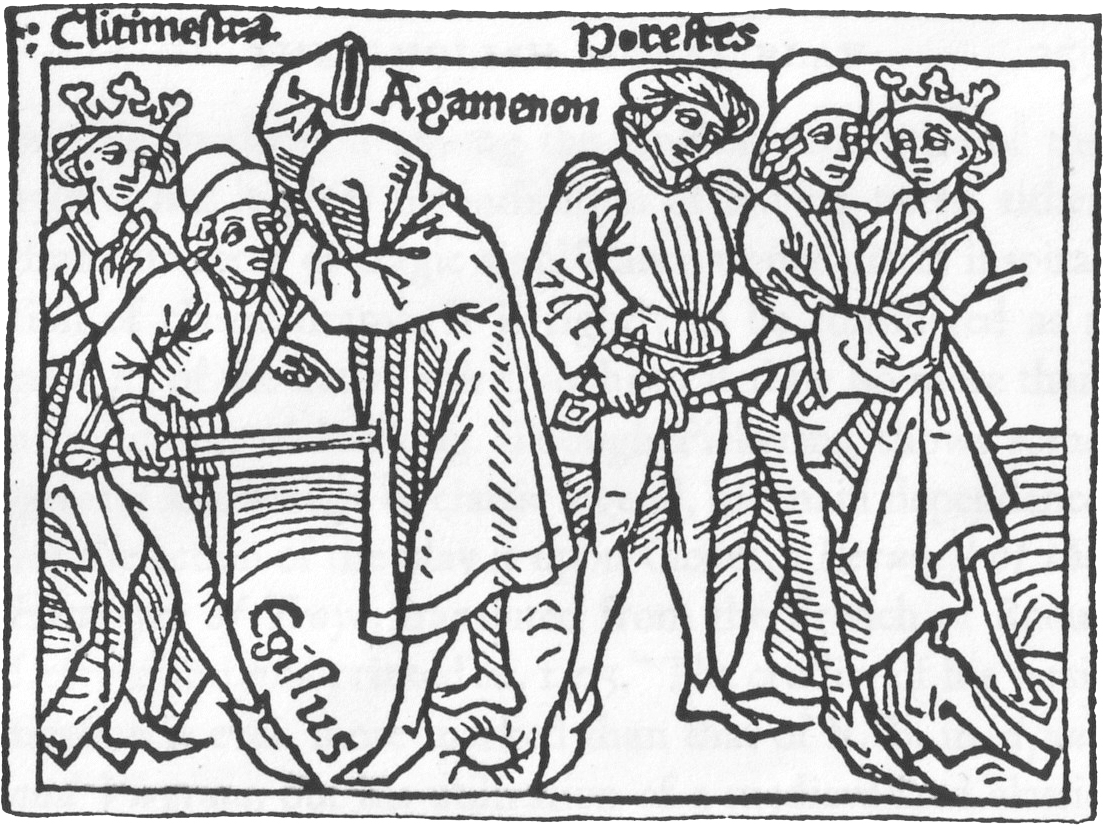
- Illustration from a 1473 edition of Boccaccio's On Famous Women of the revenge of Horestes.
- Written by: John Pickering
- Genre: Morality play

Premiere
- Date: 1567

Horestes is a late Tudor morality play by the English dramatist John Pickering. It was first published in 1567 and was most likely performed by Lord Rich's men as part of the Christmas revels at court that year. The play's full title is A new interlude of Vice containing the history of Horestes with the cruel revengement of his father's death upon his one natural mother. It has been proposed that John Pickering (John Pickeryng) is likely to be the same person as lawyer and politician Sir John Puckering.

== Source and text ==
The play dramatises the story of the ancient Greek myth of Orestes. Rather than Aeschylus' trilogy of Athenian tragedies Oresteia (458 BCE), however, Pickering's source for his version of the story is William Caxton's translation of the French romance Recuyell of the Historyes of Troye (translated in 1475). Consequently, the play's theme and dramatic structure are more medieval than classical.

Only one copy of the play is extant, which the British Museum holds. It was published by William Griffith of Fleet Street, London for sale at his shop in St. Dunstan's churchyard.

== Structure and genre ==
Along with Thomas Preston's Cambises (c.1561), the play has been identified as a "hybrid morality", due to its articulation of classical themes, stories and characters with the medieval allegorical tradition. Within this genre, the central allegorical figure of the Vice vies with a non-allegorical, classical protagonist (Horestes); though their roles are about the same size, Horestes controls the important action.

The play has an episodic structure, which alternates comic, slapstick scenes with serious, tragic ones, all unified by the theme of revenge. It is one of the earliest examples of an English revenge play, a genre that includes Kyd's The Spanish Tragedy (1587), Marston's The Malcontent (1603) and Shakespeare's Hamlet (1601). Unlike traditional moralities, Horestes presents an ambiguous ending. In line with both the Orestia and the Historyes of Troy, Horestes is forgiven for the murder of his mother and her lover; despite its interrogation during the course of the play, however, the justification for the murders remains an unresolved issue at its conclusion. In a further departure from the conventions of the morality, the forgiveness of Horestes is not prompted by his repentance.

== Staging demands ==
As with other experimental moralities from Elizabeth's reign, Horestes is longer than most of the older examples of the genre, running to 1,205 lines. The play was designed to be played by a company of six players, with each actor performing between three and seven roles each. The respective size of the roles of Horestes (521 lines) and the Vice (557 lines), as well as the play's frequent alternation of tragic and burlesque scenes, suggest that the play demanded a playing company that included two leading actors who were adept at both serious and comic acting. The actor playing Horestes also played the Woman (who appears in a brief scene between lines 626–647), while a boy actor played Clytemnestra and Hermione, as well as Hempstring and Provision. Unusually for Elizabethan drama, the play shares a role (Idumeus) between two different actors.

== Characters ==
- Horestes
- Vice
- Clytemnestra
- Egistus
- Idumeus
- Nestor
- Menelaus
- Hermione
- Rusticus
- Hodge
- Haltersack
- Hempstring

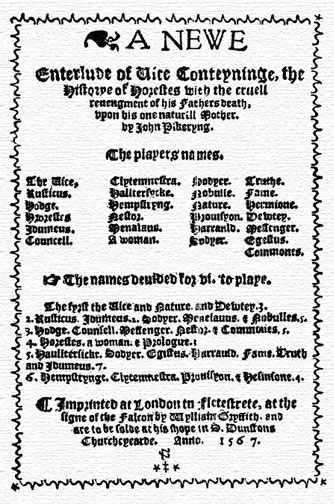
Frontispiece to the 1567 edition of the play.

- A Woman
- First Soldier
- Second Soldier
- Herald
- Messenger
- Counsel
- Nobles
- Commons
- Nature
- Provision
- Truth
- Fame
- Duty

== Sources ==
- Axton, Marie, ed. 1982. Three Tudor Classical Interludes: "Thersites", "Jacke Jugeler", "Horestes". Tudor Interludes ser. Woodbridge, Suffolk: D.S. Brewer. ISBN 0-85991-096-2.
- Bevington, David. 1962. From Mankind to Marlowe: Growth of Structure in the Popular Drama of Tudor England. Cambridge, MA: Harvard UP. ISBN 0-674-32500-1.
- Farmer, John S, ed. 1910. The History of Horestes. By John Pickering. Tudor facsimile texts ser. Amersham: John S. Farmer.
- Farnham, Willard. 1936. The Medieval Heritage of Elizabethan Tragedy. Revised ed. Oxford: Basil Blackwell, 1956.
- Hager, Alan, ed. 2005. Encyclopedia of British Writers: 16th and 17th Centuries. New York: Facts on File. ISBN 0-8160-5495-9.
- Potter, Robert A. 1975. The English Morality Play: Origins, History, and Influence of a Dramatic Tradition. London: Routledge. ISBN 0-7100-8033-6.
- Southern, Richard. 1973. The Staging of Plays Before Shakespeare. London: Faber. ISBN 0-571-10132-1.
- Spivack, Bernard. 1958. Shakespeare and the Allegory of Evil: The History of a Metaphor in Relation to his Major Villains. NY and London: Columbia UP. ISBN 0-231-01912-2.
- Weimann, Robert. 1978. Shakespeare and the Popular Tradition in the Theater: Studies in the Social Dimension of Dramatic Form and Function. Baltimore and London: The Johns Hopkins University Press. ISBN 0-8018-3506-2.
