= Universitas lingvarum Litvaniae =

Lithuanian book

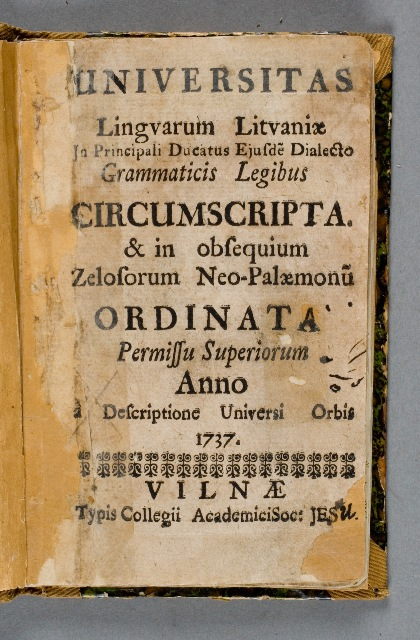
- Title page of the book, 1737
- Author: Unknown
- Language: Latin, Lithuanian, Polish
- Subject: Lithuanian grammar
- Genre: Educational book
- Published: 1737
- Publisher: Vilnius University Press
- Publication place: Lithuania

Universitas lingvarum Litvaniæ (Lithuanian: Lietuvos kalbų visuma; English: The Entirety of the Lithuanian Language) is the oldest surviving grammar of the Lithuanian language published in the territory of the Grand Duchy of Lithuania. It was written in Latin and was published in the Lithuanian capital Vilnius by the Vilnius University Press in 1737. Its author is unknown, however the grammar used by the author shows that he may have originated from the districts of Dotnuva, Kėdainiai, Surviliškis, Šėta. It was written independently as there is no influence of the grammar of the Lithuanian language of Lithuania Minor.

== Latin and Polish influences ==
The structure of the Universitas lingvarum Litvaniæ and the classification of parts of language were influenced by the Latin and Polish grammars of that period. The most important feature of the Universitas lingvarum Litvaniæ, which distinguishes it from other grammars of the Lithuanian language of that period, is the understanding of the system of accentuation of the Lithuanian language and fairly consistent marking of adjectives.

== Expanded edition, reprints, and translations ==
In 1829, Simonas Stanevičius published an expanded variant of the Universitas lingvarum Litvaniæ in Vilnius with a title Grammatica brevis linguæ Lituanicæ seu Samogiticæ (Lithuanian: Trumpas pamokimas kałbos lituviškos arba źemaitiškos; English: A Short Edification of the Lithuanian or Samogitian language). In 1896, Jan Michał Rozwadowski republished it in Kraków.

In 1981, the facsimile edition together with the Lithuanian translation was published by Kazimieras Eigminas in Vilnius.

== See also ==
- Grammatica Litvanica – the first printed grammar of the Lithuanian language, printed in 1653
- Mokslas skaitymo rašto lietuviško – the first Catholic primer of the Lithuanian language
- Catechism of Martynas Mažvydas – the first printed book in the Lithuanian language, printed in 1547
- Postil of Jonas Bretkūnas – collection of sermons and Bible commentaries published in 1591
- Catechism of Mikalojus Daukša – the first Lithuanian Roman Catholic catechism published in 1595
- Catechism of Merkelis Petkevičius – the first Lithuanian Protestant (Calvinist) catechism published in the Grand Duchy of Lithuania in 1598
