= Catechism of Mikalojus Daukša =

Historic Lithuanian-language book

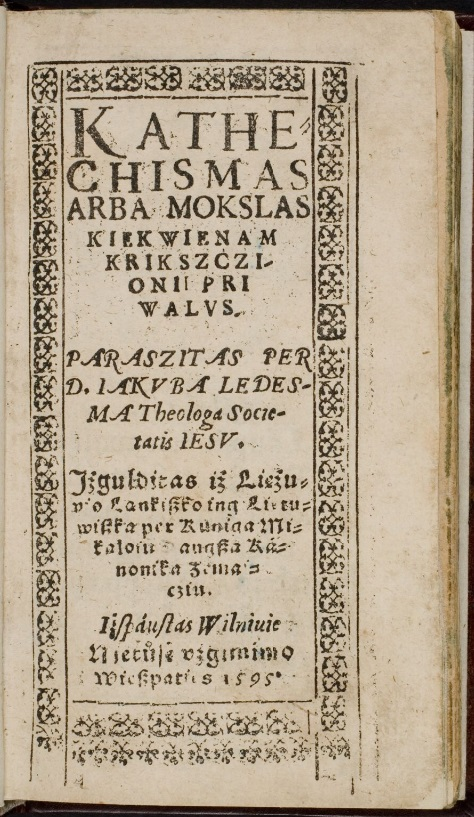
Title page of the catechism

The Catechism, or Education Obligatory to Every Christian (Lithuanian: Katekizmas, arba mokslas kiekvienam krikščioniui privalus, original Lithuanian: Kathechismas, arba Mokslas kiekwienam krikszczionii priwalvs) of Mikalojus Daukša was the first Lithuanian-language book printed in the Grand Duchy of Lithuania. It was published by the press of Vilnius Jesuit Academy in 1595 with financial support of Bishop Merkelis Giedraitis. The catechism is not an original work but a translation. As such, the work holds little value in terms of content, but is extremely valuable to the study of the Lithuanian language due to its lexical richness. The sole surviving copy is kept at Vilnius University Library.

== Earlier books ==
There were earlier publications in Lithuanian, but they were published by Protestants in the Duchy of Prussia, including Catechism of Martynas Mažvydas in 1547 and Postil of Jonas Bretkūnas in 1591. Earlier researchers, including Vaclovas Biržiška and Zenonas Ivinskis, claimed that a translation of the catechism by Peter Canisius was published in Vilnius around 1585. That would put Daukša's catechism only as the first surviving Lithuanian-language book printed in the Grand Duchy of Lithuania. The claim was based on two documents: a 1589 letter to Albert Frederick, Duke of Prussia, and foreword of the 1605 catechism printed in Vilnius. Upon careful analysis, it is likely that the letter referred to Latvian translation of Canisius' catechism, instigated by papal legate Antonio Possevino, translated by Erdmann Tolgsdorf, and published in Vilnius in 1585. It is the oldest surviving book in the Latvian language. The foreword of the 1605 catechism refers to a "lost" translation of Ledesma's catechism, but that is likely a reference to linguistic disputes that led to rejection of Daukša's work and re-translation of the catechism in 1605. The hypothetical Lithuanian catechism of 1585 is not reliably attested in any contemporary sources such as personal correspondence, subsequent published works, or catalogs of old archives and libraries. Therefore, according to Sergejus Temčinas, the claim should be rejected and Daukša's catechism should be considered the first Lithuanian-language book printed in the Grand Duchy of Lithuania.

== Content ==
Daukša's catechism was a translation of the popular Roman Catholic catechism by Diego de Ledesma, Spanish Jesuit, published in Rome in 1573. Daukša translated it from a Polish translation that in turn was a translation from Italian. The book has two parts with their own title pages and forewords: catechism (108 pages) and confessional (88 pages). The catechism, written in a question-and-answer format between a teacher and a student, has five parts on Christian faith, person's will, hope, love, and the seven sacraments. The confessional writes that a person needs to analyze and understand themselves and only then they can be Christians and go to confession. The book also includes two hymns – translations of Adoro te devote by Thomas Aquinas in syllabic verse and Salve regina in free verse. These are quite poor translations and Daukša did not exhibit greater poetic skills.

The book does not have any original texts, even forewords were translated, but Daukša did not blindly follow the Polish original and modified the text to better suit the needs of local Lithuanians. For example, the text about the First Commandment specifically referred to symbols of pagan Lithuanian mythology. In total, researchers identified about 10 larger text deletions and about 20 text additions.

== Language ==
Ostensibly, the book was intended for the Diocese of Samogitia, but Daukša wanted to reach the widest audience. The Polish original is dedicated to children, while Daukša addressed his work to every Christian. In his task, Daukša was faced with the problem of different dialects of the Lithuanian language. To appease all dialects, he included many synonyms (lexical equivalents). For the clergy, who were often Polish and spoke little Lithuanian, he included equivalent loanwords in the margins. For example, next to Lithuanian pasaulis (world), he noted svietas from Polish świat. Jonas Kruopas counted a total of 189 instances of synonyms written in the margins and 35 instances of synonyms in the same sentence in addition to numerous synonyms found in different places in the work. Overall, Daukša used far less loanwords than other early authors. Scholars believe that instead of using Slavic loanwords he invented several words, including abejojimas (doubt), įkvėpimas (inspiration), privalomas (obligatory), that became well accepted part of the standard Lithuanian.

Despite Daukša's efforts, the translation was not well accepted by the contemporaries from the Diocese of Vilnius who complained that it was not written in "Lithuanian" (i.e. eastern Aukštaitian dialect) but in "Samogitian" (i.e. western Aukštaitian dialect). Daukša translated and submitted for publication two works: the catechism and the postil. Bishop Merkelis Giedraitis, patron of Daukša, lacked funds to publish both books – the full cost of the publication had to be borne by the patron as it was forbidden to sell books published by the Jesuits. Therefore, Giedraitis proposed to Benedykt Woyna, administrator of the Diocese of Vilnius, to share the burden: Giedraitis would pay for the much more substantial and expensive postil while Woyna would pay for the catechism. Perhaps Daukša knew of this arrangement beforehand and made the efforts to include synonyms for all dialects. But the final product was not suited for the Diocese of Vilnius. Therefore, the catechism of Ledesma was re-translated by an anonymous author and re-published in Vilnius in 1605. This work is the first published work in the old eastern Aukštaitian dialect used around Vilnius. This dialect became extinct in the 17th century due to the pressure of Slavic languages.

== Publication history ==
The catechism was not known for earlier authors on Daukša until a copy was found and republished by Eduards Volters in 1886. In 1929, Ernst Sittig published the catechism together with the Polish original and the anonymous re-translation of 1605. A new publication was prepared by Vida Jakštienė and Jonas Palionis in 1995 (ISBN 9785420012444). It includes photocopied and transliterated catechism alongside the Polish original.

== See also ==
- Postil of Mikalojus Daukša published in 1599
- Catechism of Merkelis Petkevičius – Calvinist catechism published in 1598 in response to Daukša's catechism
- Catechism of Martynas Mažvydas – the first printed book in the Lithuanian language, printed in 1547
- Mokslas skaitymo rašto lietuviško – the first Catholic primer of the Lithuanian language
- Universitas lingvarum Litvaniae – the oldest surviving grammar of the Lithuanian language, published in the territory of the Grand Duchy of Lithuania (1737)
- Grammatica Litvanica – the first printed grammar of the Lithuanian language, printed in 1653
