= Babėnai =

- City part
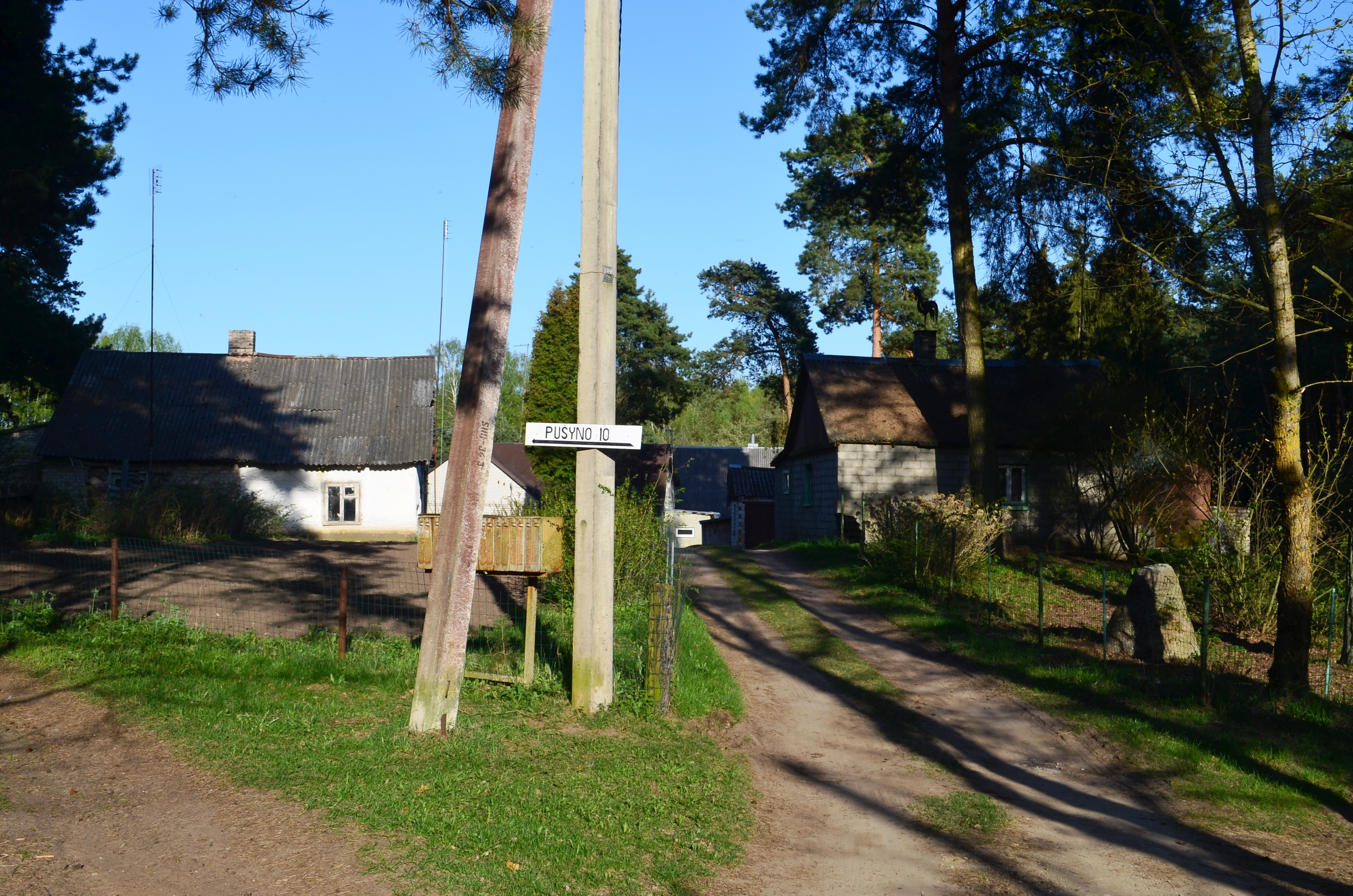

- Location in Lithuania Babėnai (Lithuania)
- Coordinates: 55°19′19″N 23°58′30″E
- Country: Lithuania
- County: Kaunas County
- Municipality: Kėdainiai district municipality
- Eldership: Kėdainiai City Eldership
- Time zone: UTC+2 (EET)
  - Summer (DST): UTC+3 (EEST)

Babėnai (formerly Polish: Bobiany, Russian: Бабяны) is a northern part of the Kėdainiai city, located in Kėdainiai district municipality, in Kaunas County, in central Lithuania. It is between the Nevėžis and Dotnuvėlė rivers, by the road to Krekenava and Vilnius-Šiauliai railway. There are Babėnai park and pond, oil repository, old cemetery, Holocaust place and the old Daukša oak tree.

== History ==
Babėnai (as Babyne) is mentioned the first time in the Hermann von Wartberge chronicle. At the 16th century Babėnai parcel was mentioned as an estate of Daukša family. At the 19th century Babėnai was an okolica, an estate of the Dapkevičiai and Petruševičiai. Around 1923, most of Babėnai was merged to Kėdainiai. It was a resort area during Interwar period. A small part of Babėnai still was a village (till 1954 as a center of selsovet) but during Soviet era whole Babėnai became a part of Kėdainiai. From 1959, it was connected with a bus Line 1 to Kėdainiai.

== Notable people ==
Babėnai is a home place of famous Lithuanian writer, priest, educator Mikalojus Daukša (born between 1527 and 1538).
