= Mokslas skaitymo rašto lietuviško =

Lithuanian book

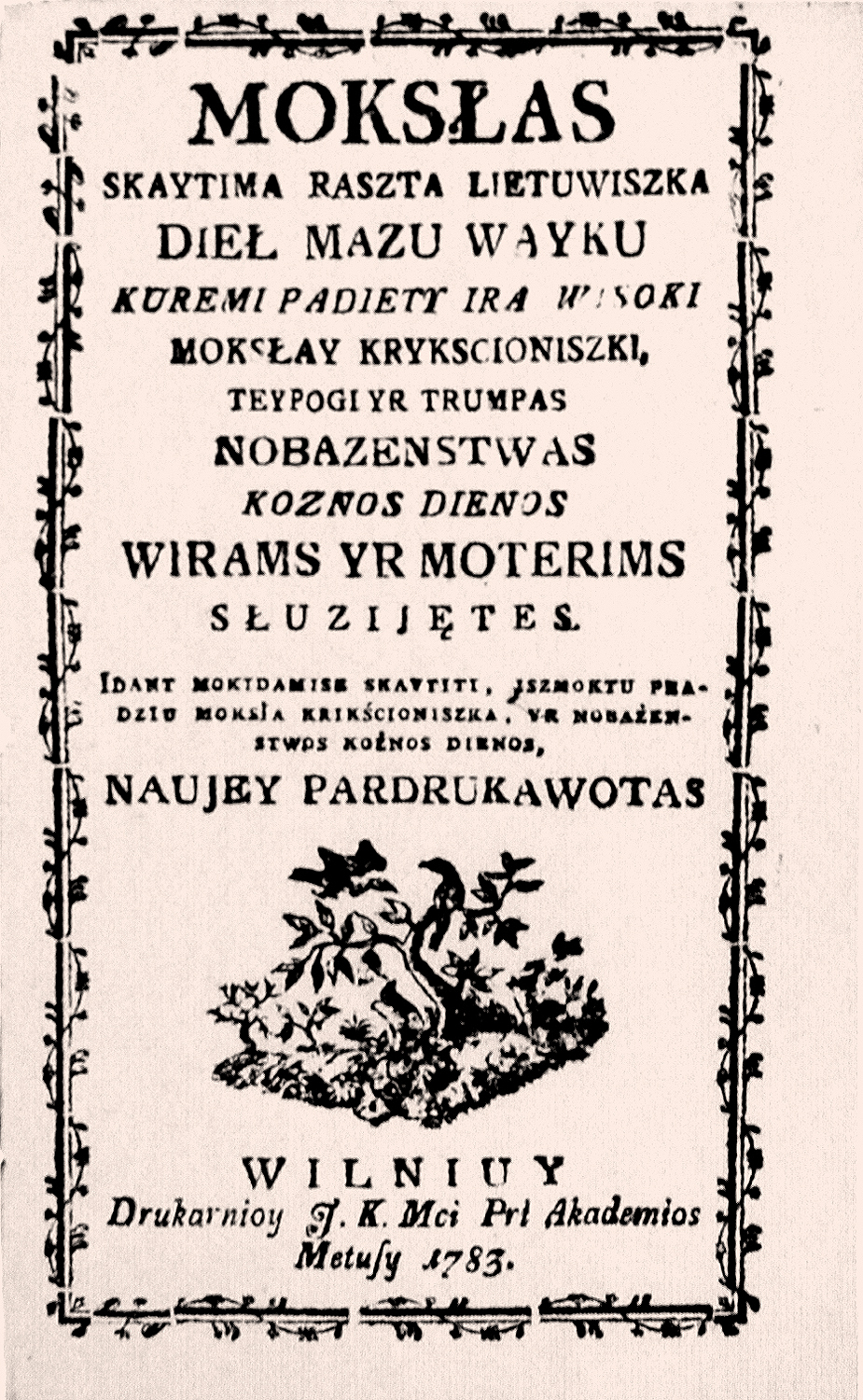
- Title page of the 1783 edition primer
- Author: Unknown
- Language: Lithuanian
- Subject: Primer
- Genre: Lithuanian language educational book
- Published: 1759–1864
- Publisher: Vilnius University Press, Józef Zawadzki Press
- Publication place: Lithuania

Mokslas skaitymo rašto lietuviško (Old Lithuanian: Moksłas skaityma raszta lietuwiszka, lit. 'The Science of Reading Lithuanian Writing') is the first Catholic primer of the Lithuanian language.

The first Lithuanian primer Mokslas skaitymo rašto lenkiško (Old Lithuanian: Moksłas skaytima raszto lękiszko, lit. 'The Science of Reading Polish Writing') was published in 1759–1761, however later it was published with a name Mokslas skaitymo rašto lietuviško (Moksłas skaityma raszta lietuwiszka, 'The Science of Reading Lithuanian Writing'). In 1776–1790, about 1,000 copies of the primer were issued annually, in total – over 15,000 copies.

This primer was published until 1864 and was the most important factor in educating the mass audience of readers of the Lithuanian literature.

== Gallery ==
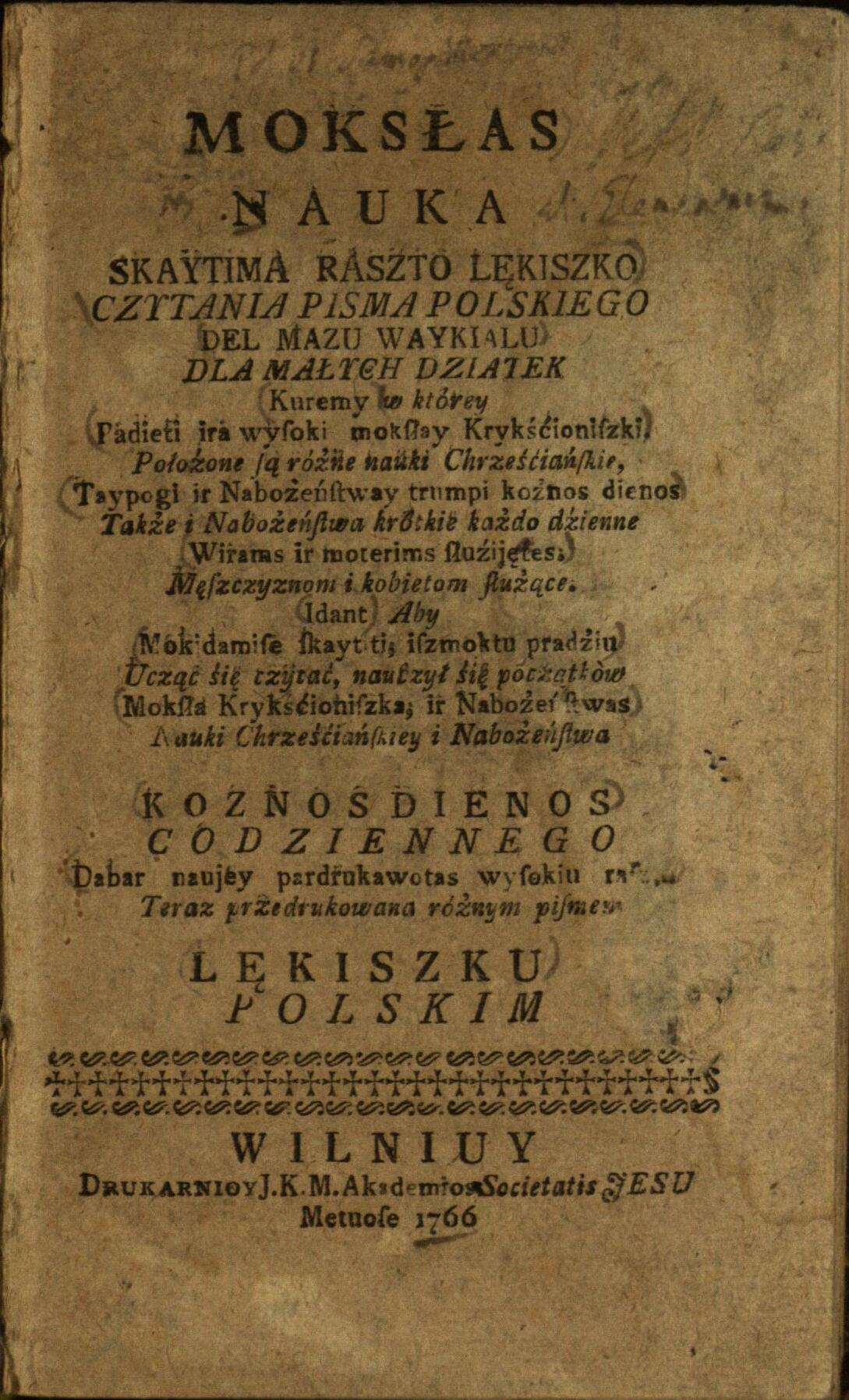
Mokslas skaitymo rašto lenkiško, 1766 edition

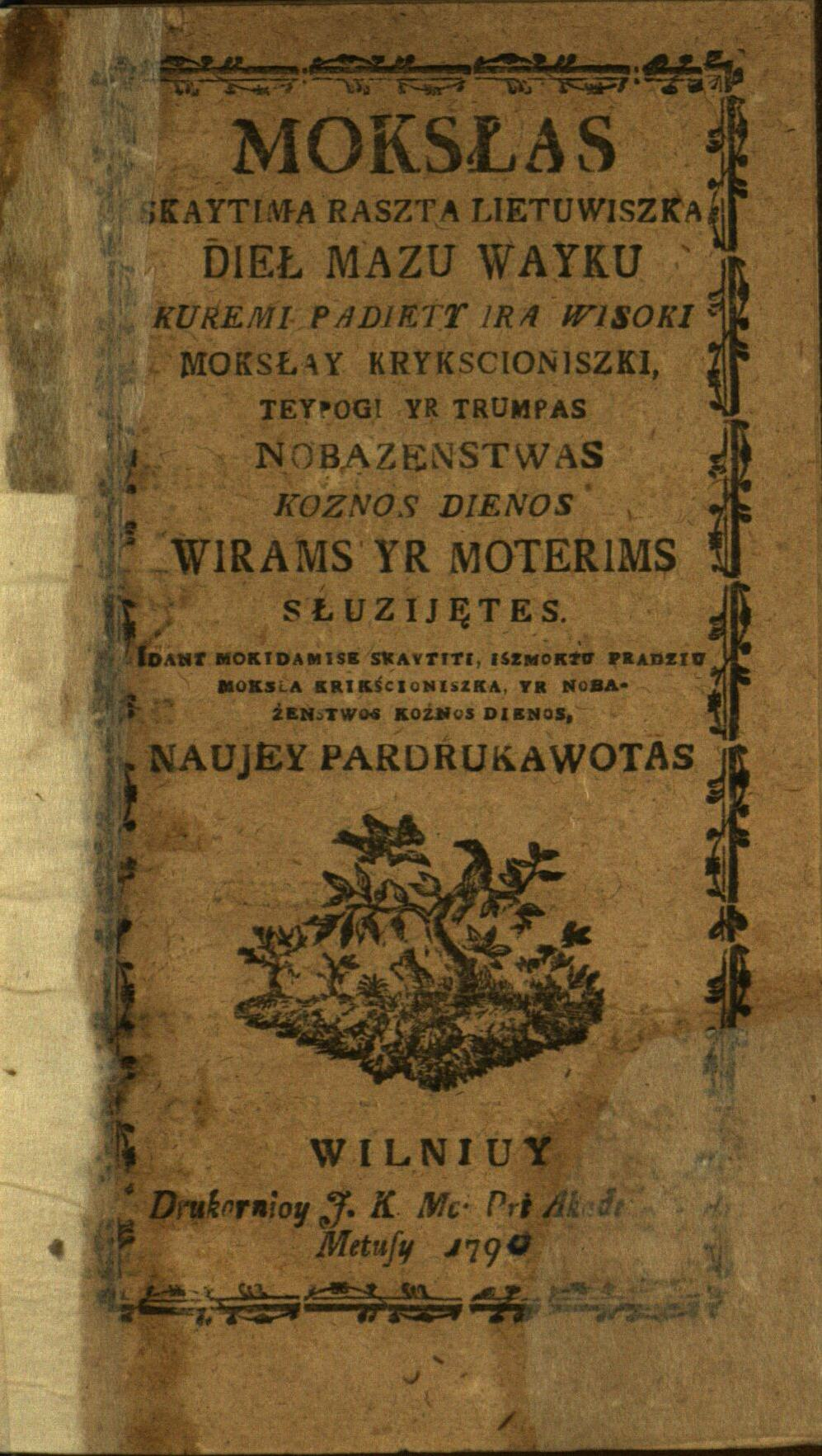
Mokslas skaitymo rašto lietuviško, 1790 edition

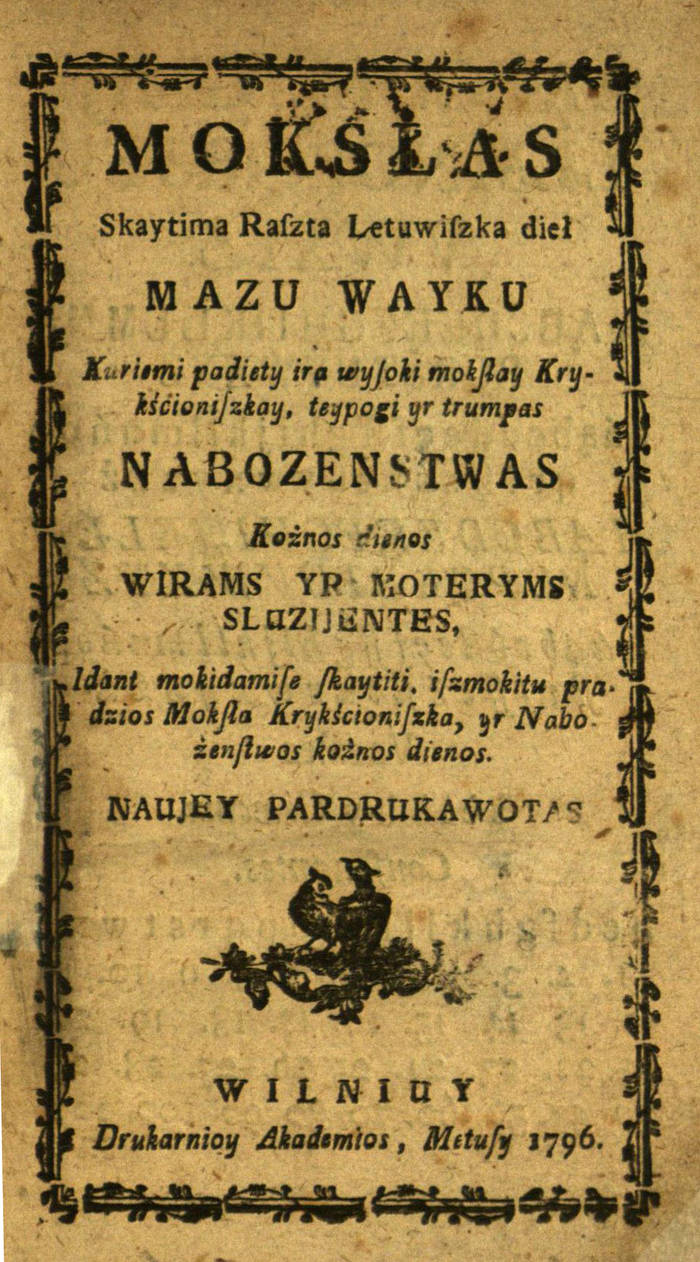
Mokslas skaitymo rašto lietuviško, 1796 edition

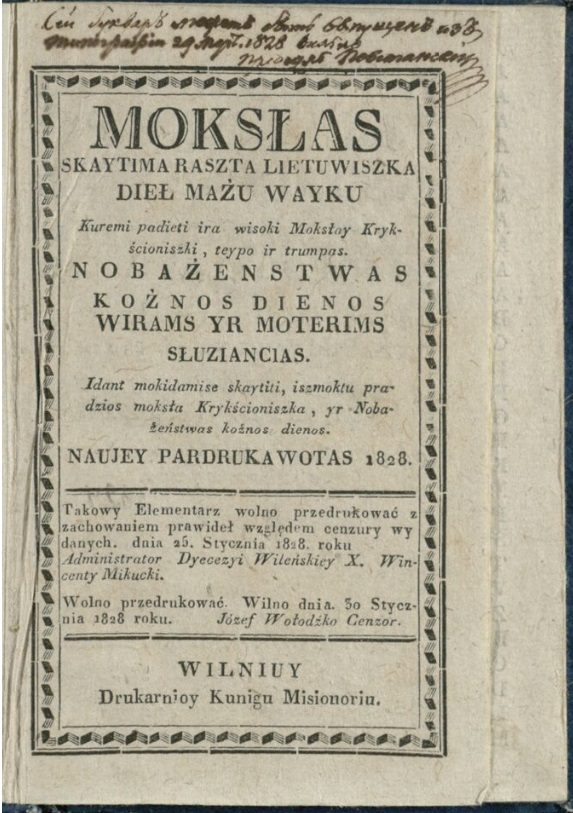
Mokslas skaitymo rašto lietuviško, 1828 edition

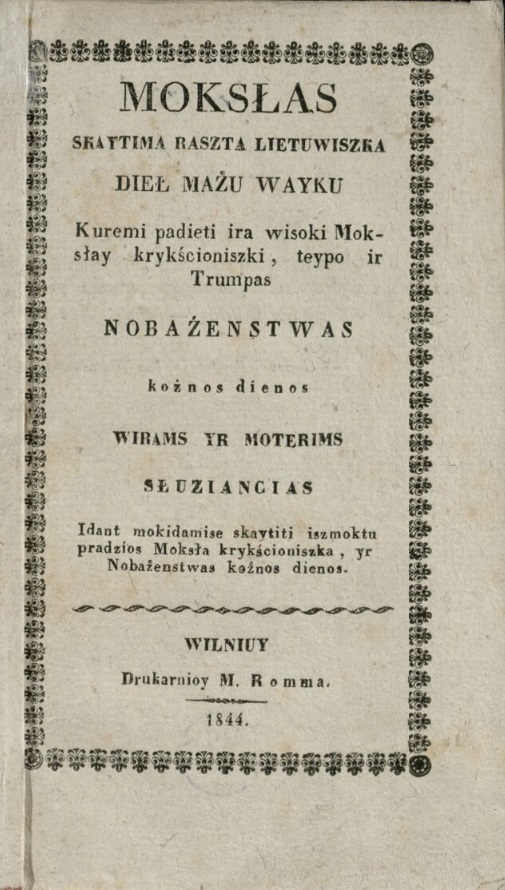
Mokslas skaitymo rašto lietuviško, 1844 edition

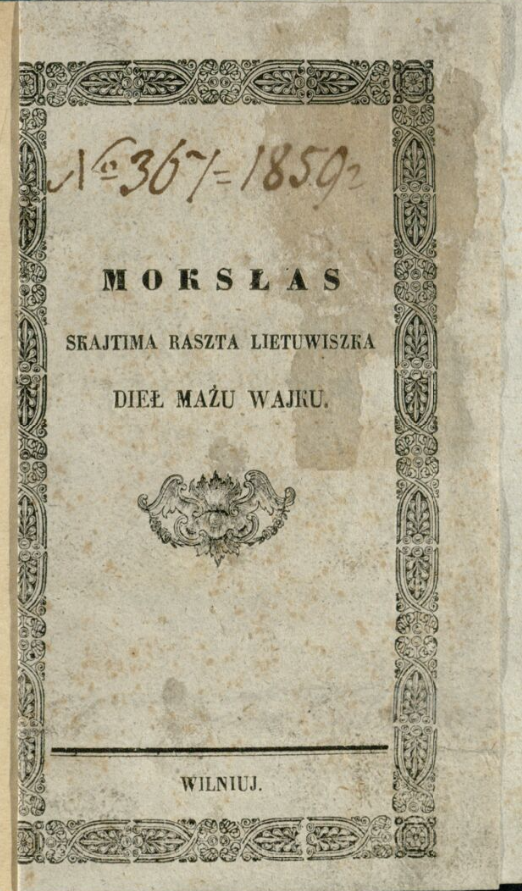
Mokslas skaitymo rašto lietuviško, 1859 edition

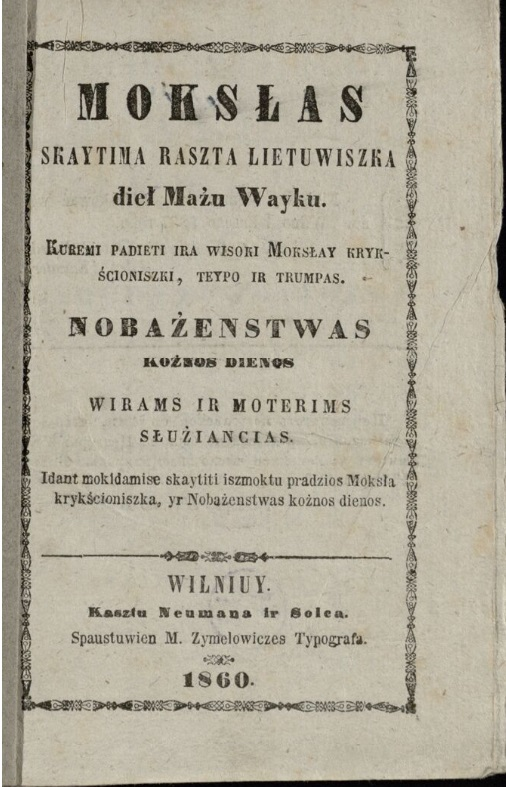
Mokslas skaitymo rašto lietuviško, 1860 edition

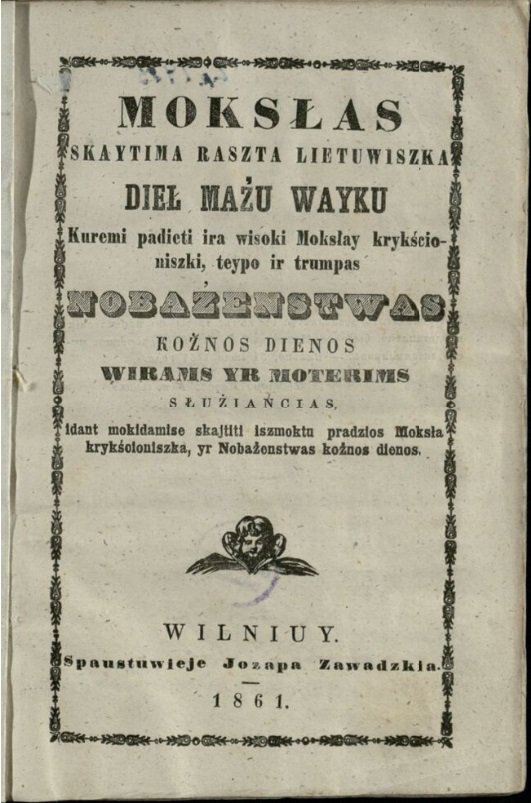
Mokslas skaitymo rašto lietuviško, 1861 edition

== See also ==
- Catechism of Martynas Mažvydas – the first printed book in the Lithuanian language, printed in 1547
- Postil of Jonas Bretkūnas – collection of sermons and Bible commentaries published in 1591
- Catechism of Mikalojus Daukša – the first Lithuanian Roman Catholic catechism published in 1595
- Catechism of Merkelis Petkevičius – the first Lithuanian Protestant (Calvinist) catechism published in the Grand Duchy of Lithuania in 1598
- Universitas lingvarum Litvaniae – the oldest surviving grammar of the Lithuanian language
- Grammatica Litvanica – the first printed grammar of the Lithuanian language
