= Daniel Klein (grammarian) =

German linguist (1609–1666)

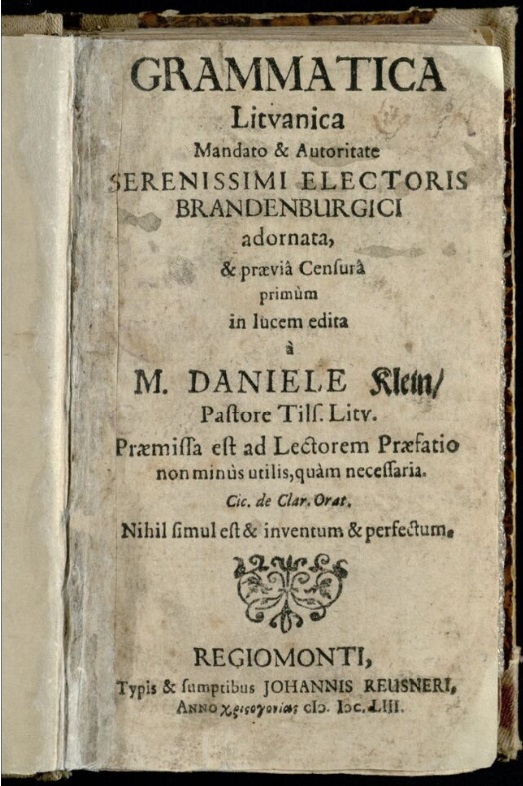
Title page of the Grammatica Litvanica, published in Königsberg in 1653

Daniel Klein (Lithuanian: Danielius Kleinas; 1609–1666) was a Lutheran pastor and scholar from Tilsit, Duchy of Prussia, who is best known for writing the first grammar book of the Lithuanian language.

== University education and start of career as a pastor ==
Klein studied philosophy, theology, Greek and Hebrew in the University of Königsberg. In 1637 he became a Lutheran pastor.

== Publication of Lithuanian grammar ==
In 1653 Klein published the first printed grammar book of the Lithuanian language – Grammatica Litvanica, written in Latin. Klein coined the distinctive Lithuanian letter Ė.

== Other works written in Lithuanian ==
He also wrote a Lithuanian dictionary, but it was left unpublished. Klein published collections of Lithuanian hymns (giesmės), some of which he wrote himself.

== Posthumous reputation in the 18th century ==
Another German, as well an Evangelical Lutheran priest, and an appreciator of the Lithuanian language, who wrote a grammar of the Lithuanian language in German language, Gottfried Ostermeyer, in the 1793 book described Daniel Klein as follows:

Educated, pious and very dedicated to the affairs of the Lithuanian parish, but a man who had seen much hardship throughout his life, whose diligence and honesty earned him ingratitude, who can hardly find his equal and will bring eternal shame to his envious and persecutors.
