= Jakob Ayrer =

German playwright and author (c. 1543–1625)

Jakob Ayrer (c. 1543 – March 26, 1605 or in 1625) was a German playwright and author of Fastnachtsspiele (Carnival plays).

== Life ==
Little is known of Ayrer's living circumstances. He lived as an ironmonger in Nuremberg, probably studying theology and law in Bamberg before returning in 1593 to Nuremberg, where he was Imperial notary and legal prosecutor.

Ayrer was the last significant composer of Fastnachtsspiele and a very prolific author: of his 106 plays, sixty-nine survive. He took his material from Greek mythology, Roman fables and German chapbooks and stories; he also translated plays of Shakespeare. Ayrer died in 1605 in his birth city of Nuremberg. Opus Theatricum, a six-volume selection of his plays, Fastnachtsspiele and farces, appeared in 1618.

As a dramatist, Ayrer is virtually the successor of Hans Sachs, but he came under the influence of the so-called Englische Komodianten, that is, troupes of English actors, who, at the close of the 16th century and during the 17th, repeatedly visited the Continent, bringing with them the repertory of the Elizabethan theatre. From those actors Ayrer learned how to enliven his dramas with sensational incidents and spectacular effects, and from them he borrowed the character of the clown. Influence may have operated in the other direction as well; Comedia von der schönen Sidea (ca. 1600; "Comedy of the Beautiful Sidea") is often cited as the plot model used by William Shakespeare in The Tempest. Ayrer's plays, however, are in spite of his foreign models, hardly more dramatic, in the true sense of the word, than those of Sachs.

== Works ==
- Von der Erbauung Roms ("The Building of Rome"), 1595
- Von der schönen Melusina ("Fair Melusina"), 1598
- Von dreien bösen Weibern ("Three Bad Wives"), 1598
- Von zweien Brüdern aus Syragusa ("Two Brothers from Syracuse", after Shakespeare)
- Opus Theatricum, 1618 (collection of thirty plays by Ayrer)
