= Disputatio nova contra mulieres =

Satirical misogynistic Latin treatise

Disputatio nova contra mulieres, qua probatur eas homines non esse (English translation: A new argument against women, in which it is demonstrated that they are not human beings) is a satirical misogynistic Latin-language treatise first published in 1595 and subsequently reprinted several times, particularly throughout the 17th and 18th centuries. Disputatio was written anonymously, although it has been attributed to Valens Acidalius, a 16th-century German critic.

Despite the fact that the treatise was meant to parody the Socinian Anabaptist belief that Jesus of Nazareth was not divine, it has also been "used as a serious text to pour ridicule on women". Disputatio proved to be unusually provocative in its time for a publication of its size, which eventually led to the Catholic Holy See listing the manuscript in its Index Librorum Prohibitorum (List of Prohibited Books) on multiple occasions.

== See also ==
- Valens Acidalius
