= Catechism of Martynas Mažvydas =

1547 book by Martynas Mažvydas

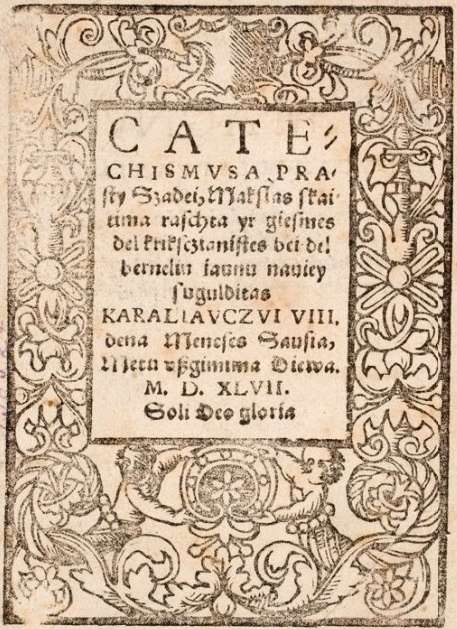
Title page of the Catechism

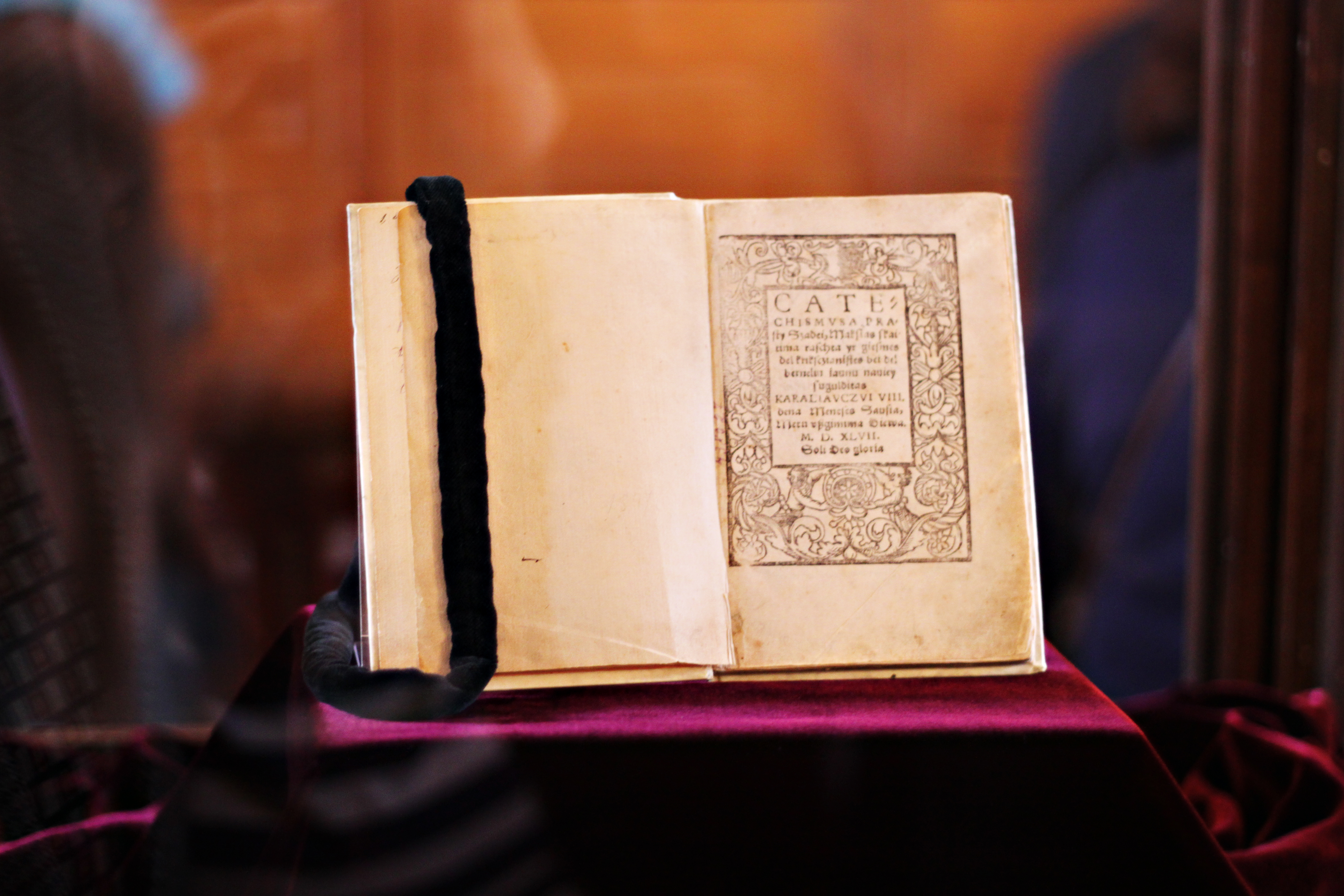
One of the two surviving copies of the Catechism

The Simple Words of Catechism (Lithuanian: Katekizmo paprasti žodžiai) by Martynas Mažvydas is the first printed book in the Lithuanian language. It was printed on 8 January 1547 by Hans Weinreich in Königsberg. The 79-page book followed the teachings of Martin Luther, but reflects both religious and secular needs. The book included the first Lithuanian-language poem, primer with alphabet, basic catechism, and 11 religious hymns with sheet music. The book was written in the Samogitian dialect and printed in Gothic (schwabacher) font; the Latin dedication and preface are printed in Latin font (antiqua).

== History ==
There is no direct evidence, but initiators of the book were most likely Abraomas Kulvietis and Stanislovas Rapalionis, professors of the Königsberg University, who witnessed the publications of the first Lutheran books in the Polish and Prussian languages. The cost of the publication was defrayed from the treasury of the grand Duke. The Catechism had a circulation of 200–300, but not all copies were actually used. This happened due to objective reasons. Firstly, there were few parishes, which means less demand; secondly, Luther's Small Catechism, which was translated into Lithuanian by Baltramiejus Vilentas and satisfied Church's needs better, came out shortly after. Only two copies of the Catechism survived: one is held by the Vilnius University Library, and the other by the Nicolaus Copernicus University Library in Toruń, Poland.

== Authorship ==
The book does not mention its author or editor. Still, the book was considered the work of Martynas Mažvydas since the 16th century, based on a mention by Baltramiejus Vilentas. Any doubts were dispelled when in 1938, Polish linguist Jan Safarewicz discovered an acrostic in the Lithuanian preface of the Catechism. When reading the initial letters of lines 3–19 of the preface, it spells out MARTJNVS MASVJDJVS, or the name Martynas Mažvydas in Latin. About two-thirds of the text in the book was written by Mažvydas. Other authors probably include Abraomas Kulvietis, Stanislovas Rapalionis, Jurgis Zablockis, and possibly rector Friedrich Staphylus.

Martynas Mažvydas followed examples set by other authors. Besides the catechisms of Germans Georg Sauermann (c. 1492–1527) and Jodocus Willich, and Polish Jan Malecki-Sandecki, the booklet was mainly written by referencing to the catechisms and hymnals of Jan Seklucjan, who at that time worked in Königsberg.

== Contents ==
The book content can be divided into eight parts:

1. Title page is decorated with a vignette in the Renaissance style, which encloses the title of the book. It is the only illustration in the book and, looking from the artistic point of view, the book is humble. The full title is as follows:
  - Original Lithuanian: Catechismvsa prasty Szadei, Makslas skaitima raschta yr giesmes del kriksczianistes bei del berneliu iaunu nauiey sugulditas Karaliavczvi VIII. dena Meneses Sausia, Metu vßgimima Diewa. M.D.XLVII. Soli Deo gloria
  - Modern literally Lithuanian: Katekizmo prasti [paprasti] žodžiai, mokslas skaitymo rašto ir giesmės, dėl krikščionystės bei dėl bernelių jaunų naujai suguldytos Karaliaučiuj VIII dieną mėnesies sausio metų užgimimo Dievo MDXLVII
  - English: The Simple Words of Catechism, Instruction in Reading and Writing, and Hymns for Christendom and for Young Children Newly Put Together In Königsberg on the Eight Day of the Month of January of the Year of the Birth of God 1547. Glory to God alone
2. Latin dedication is a Latin quatrain in elegiac couplet addressed and dedicated to the Grand Duchy of Lithuania. It expresses patriotism and loyalty to the Grand Dukes and emphasizes that the Lithuanian Reformation serves not only God, but the country as well. The dedication also reveals that the book was meant not for the Duchy of Prussia, to which Mažvydas arrived a year ago, but to his homeland Lithuania.
3. Latin preface, or Grace and Peace for the Pastors and Servants of the Lithuanian Churches, was likely written by Mažvydas and Friedrich Staphylus, the rector of the University of Königsberg. As he had lived in Lithuania, he knew the Lithuanian, Polish and Ruthenian languages. The preface presents the key idea of Lutheranism: the Bible and other religious literature should be available to everyone and not just the clergy. This is accomplished by publishing the religious books in national languages. The preface also bemoans that the Lithuanian nation is very poorly educated and continues to embrace pagan Lithuanian gods. It promises to publish a better, more comprehensive catechism.
4. Lithuanian preface, or The Booklet Speaks to Lietuvininkai and Samogitians, is the first poem in the Lithuanian language. Its 112 lines could be divided into three parts: personification (lines 1–62), peasant's speech (lines 63–78), and address to the nobility (lines 79–112). At first, the book addresses the reader and urges them to read and learn about the "true faith" (Brothers sisters, take me and read me). In the second part, the poem records a speech of a peasant. This poetic character appears to be very poorly educated: he has never heard of the Ten Commandments and would rather consult a witch than attend mass. In the last part, the author emotionally addresses the lords and the clergy, asking them to educate the people in the Christian way. An English translation was published in Lituanus.
5. Primer, or Cheap and Short Instruction in Reading and Writing, is a four-page introduction to learning to read. It presents the first Lithuanian alphabet: 23 uppercase letters in Latin font and 26 lowercase letters in Gothic font. It also included exercises in constructing syllables, i.e. taking all consonants and systematically pairing them with all vowels. The primer ends with two tips. First, the teachers are advised not to spend too much time on the exercises and actually teach children to learn. Second, the schoolboys were urged to learn and not to be lazy.
6. Catechism is the first religious text in the book. It included translations of the Ten Commandments, Apostles' Creed, Lord's Prayer, the Sacraments of Holy Baptism and Holy Communion, and short social and moral instructions. For example, readers were told to respect their parents and to protect love and harmony in families.
7. End-word is short but has two parts. The first part, once again, asks Lithuanians and Samogitians to learn about Jesus and to teach their families as well. The second part is a quatrain addressed to the reader. It proclaims that books are now being printed in the reader's native language and asks to correct any errors that might occurred.
8. Hymnal includes 11 hymns and 10 sheet music (two hymns used the same sheet). Neither authors nor translators of the hymns are indicated. The main source for these texts was a Polish hymnal by Jan Seklucjan.

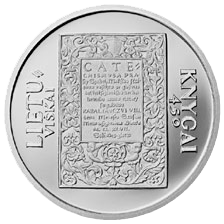
Lithuanian 50 litų coin commemorating the 450th anniversary of the Catechism, 1997.

== See also ==
- Postil of Jonas Bretkūnas – collection of sermons and Bible commentaries published in 1591
- Catechism of Mikalojus Daukša – the first Lithuanian Roman Catholic catechism published in 1595
- Catechism of Merkelis Petkevičius – the first Lithuanian Protestant (Calvinist) catechism published in the Grand Duchy of Lithuania in 1598
- Mokslas skaitymo rašto lietuviško – the first Catholic primer of the Lithuanian language
- Universitas lingvarum Litvaniae – the oldest surviving grammar of the Lithuanian language
- Grammatica Litvanica – the first printed grammar of the Lithuanian language
