= Vice (character) =

Stock character of the medieval morality plays

Vice is a stock character of the medieval morality plays. While the main character of these plays was representative of every human being (and usually named Mankind, Everyman, or some other generalizing of humanity at large), the other characters were representatives of (and usually named after) personified virtues or vices who sought to win control of man's soul. While the virtues in a morality play can be seen as messengers of God, the vices were viewed as messengers of the Devil.

Over time, the morality plays began to include many lesser vices on stage and one chief vice figure, a tempter above all the others, who was called simply the Vice. Originally, the Vice was a serious role, but over time his part became largely comical. Scholar F.P. Wilson notes, “Whatever else the Vice may be, he is always the chief comic character”; this comic portrayal is explained thus: "In theory there is no reason why vice should not be put upon the stage with the same seriousness and sobriety as virtue: in practice, however, dramatists, and many a preacher, knew that men and women will not listen for long to unrelieved gravity”. In his Declaration of Popish Impostures from 1603, Bishop Harsnet wrote that "It was a pretty part in the old church plays, when the nimble Vice would skip up nimbly like a Jacke-an-apes into the Devil's necke, and ride the devil a course, and belabour him with his wooden dagger, till he made him roar, whereat the people would laugh to see the Devil so Vice-haunted.”

== Characteristics ==
The Vice can be an allegoric representation of one of the Seven Vices or a more general portrayal of evil as the tempter of man. Vice often takes the audience into complicity by revealing its evil plans, often through soliloquies or monologues. Its enacting is frequently comic or absurd.

== Origins ==
The word "vice" is derived from Latin vitium "defect, offence, blemish, imperfection", in both physical and verbal senses. The character of the Vice developed from that of the domestic fool or jester some tincture in the later plays supplied from the mischief-making servants in Plautus and Terence.

Other ancestors of the vice are the devils and the vices in earlier moralities, from the comic characters in the folk play—the ancestors of the Morris fool, the fool of the Mummer's play, the clown of the Swordplay; from the medieval sermon, not merely from its 'characters' of the seven deadly sins and their representatives in contemporary life but from its jests and satirical bent; from the plotting servants of Terence and Plautus; from the creative zest of the actors speaking more than was set down for them.

== Later developments ==
The Vice character developed into the villain in Renaissance theatre. Richard III in William Shakespeare's drama of the same name links himself with the Vice when he declares:

"Thus like the formal Vice, Iniquity, / I moralize two meanings in one word" (III.i.82–83)

Other examples of the Vice in Renaissance theatre include Iago (who plays up the more villainous aspects of the Vice) from Othello and Sir John Falstaff (who plays up the more comic aspects of the vice) from Henry IV, Parts 1 and 2 and The Merry Wives of Windsor.
