= Postil of Jonas Bretkūnas =

1591 book by Jonas Bretkūnas

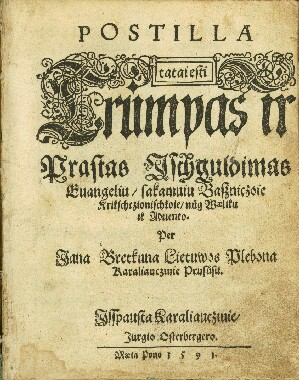
Cover page of Postilė by Jonas Bretkūnas

Postilė (full title: Postilla, tatai esti trumpas ir prastas ischguldimas euangeliu) is a 1000-page postil (collection of sermons and Bible commentaries) written in the Lithuanian language by Jonas Bretkūnas in 1591. It was designed for the purposes of Protestant priests serving Lithuanian communities in Lithuania Minor. The book was used until the 18th century. Postilė is one earliest works in Lithuanian that were not merely translations but also included original texts. It contains much ethnographic data about everyday life of the common people. About 30 copies of Postilė survive; 10 of them are kept in Lithuanian libraries and museums.

== See also ==
- Catechism of Martynas Mažvydas – the first printed book in the Lithuanian language, printed in 1547
- Catechism of Mikalojus Daukša – the first Lithuanian Roman Catholic catechism published in 1595
- Catechism of Merkelis Petkevičius – the first Lithuanian Protestant (Calvinist) catechism published in the Grand Duchy of Lithuania in 1598
- Mokslas skaitymo rašto lietuviško – the first Catholic primer of the Lithuanian language
- Universitas lingvarum Litvaniae – the oldest surviving grammar of the Lithuanian language
- Grammatica Litvanica – the first printed grammar of the Lithuanian language
