= Mikalojus Daukša =

Lithuanian cleric and writer (d. 1613)

- Administrator of the Diocese of Samogitia
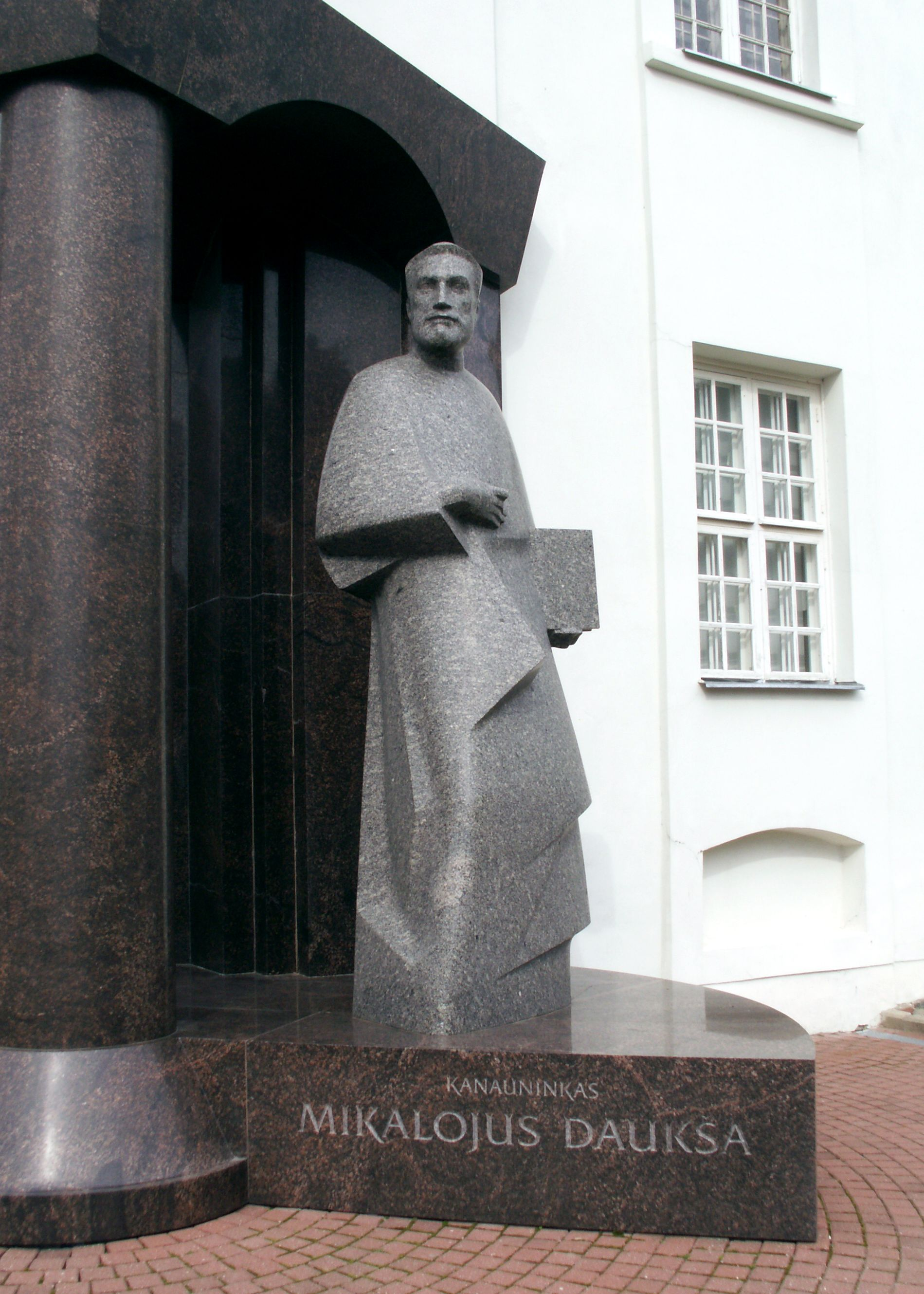
- Mikalojus Daukša in Varniai
- Church: Roman Catholic Church
- Diocese: Diocese of Samogitia
- Installed: 1570
- Term ended: 1610

Personal details
- Born: Between 1527 and 1538 Babėnai, Grand Duchy of Lithuania
- Died: January 1615 Varniai, Grand Duchy of Lithuania, Polish–Lithuanian Commonwealth
- Buried: Varniai, Grand Duchy of Lithuania, Polish–Lithuanian Commonwealth
- Denomination: Roman Catholic
- Occupation: Renaissance humanist, one of the creators of Lithuanian writing, Lithuanian Catholic Church official
- Education: It is assumed that he studied at one of the Western European universities

Mikalojus Daukša (other possible spellings include Mikalojus Daugsza, Polish: Mikołaj Dauksza and Mikolay Dowksza; after 1527 – 16 February 1613 in Medininkai) was a Lithuanian and Latin religious writer, translator and a Lithuanian Catholic Church official. He is best known as the first among Lithuania's humanists to underline the need to codify and promote the Lithuanian language over Chancery Ruthenian and Polish, which were in use in the Grand Duchy at the time. Furthermore, Daukša preached the ideas of Counter-Reformation and Renaissance humanism.

Daukša's Lithuanian translation of Jacob Ledesma's catechism (1595) became the first book in Lithuanian to be published in the Grand Duchy of Lithuania. In 2007, Daukša's translated catechism of Jacob Ledesma was included into the UNESCO's Lithuanian National Memory of the World Register and its copy is kept in the Vilnius University Library.

== Biography ==
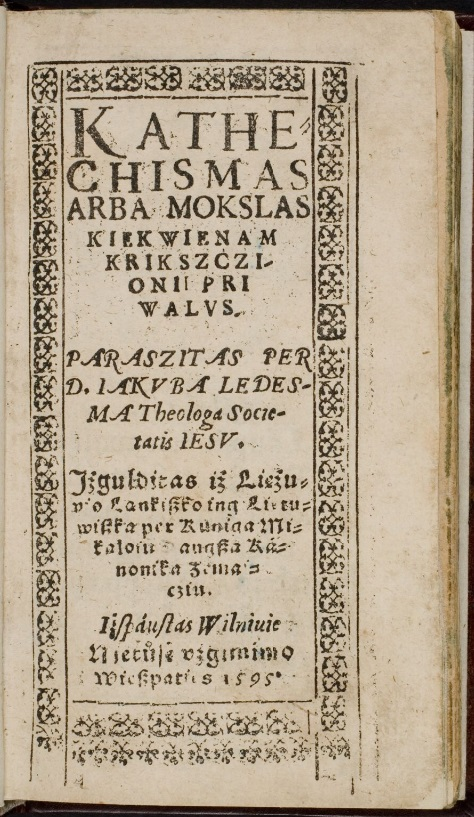
Catechism of Mikalojus Daukša (Vilnius, 1595)

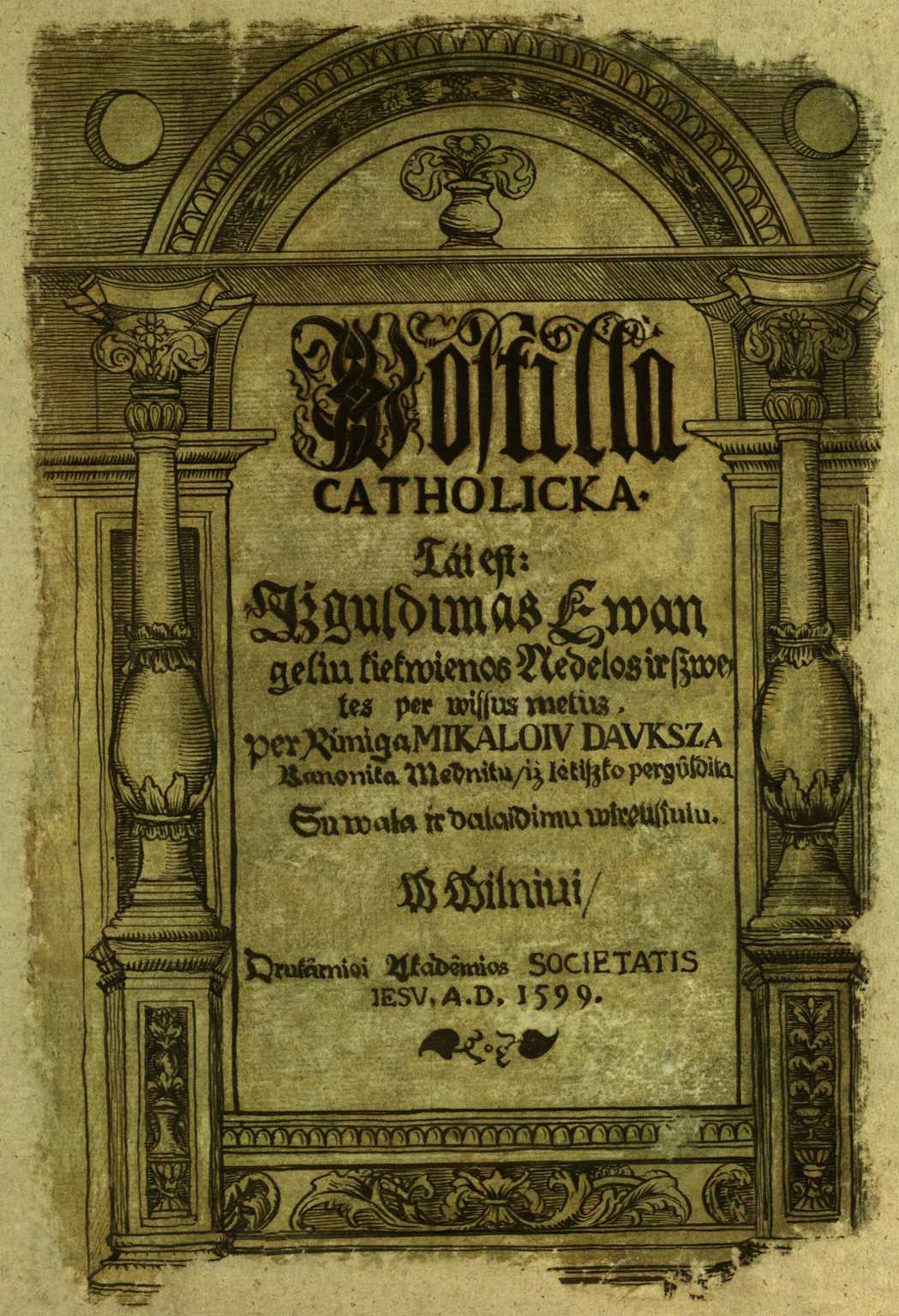
Postil of Mikalojus Daukša (Vilnius, 1599)

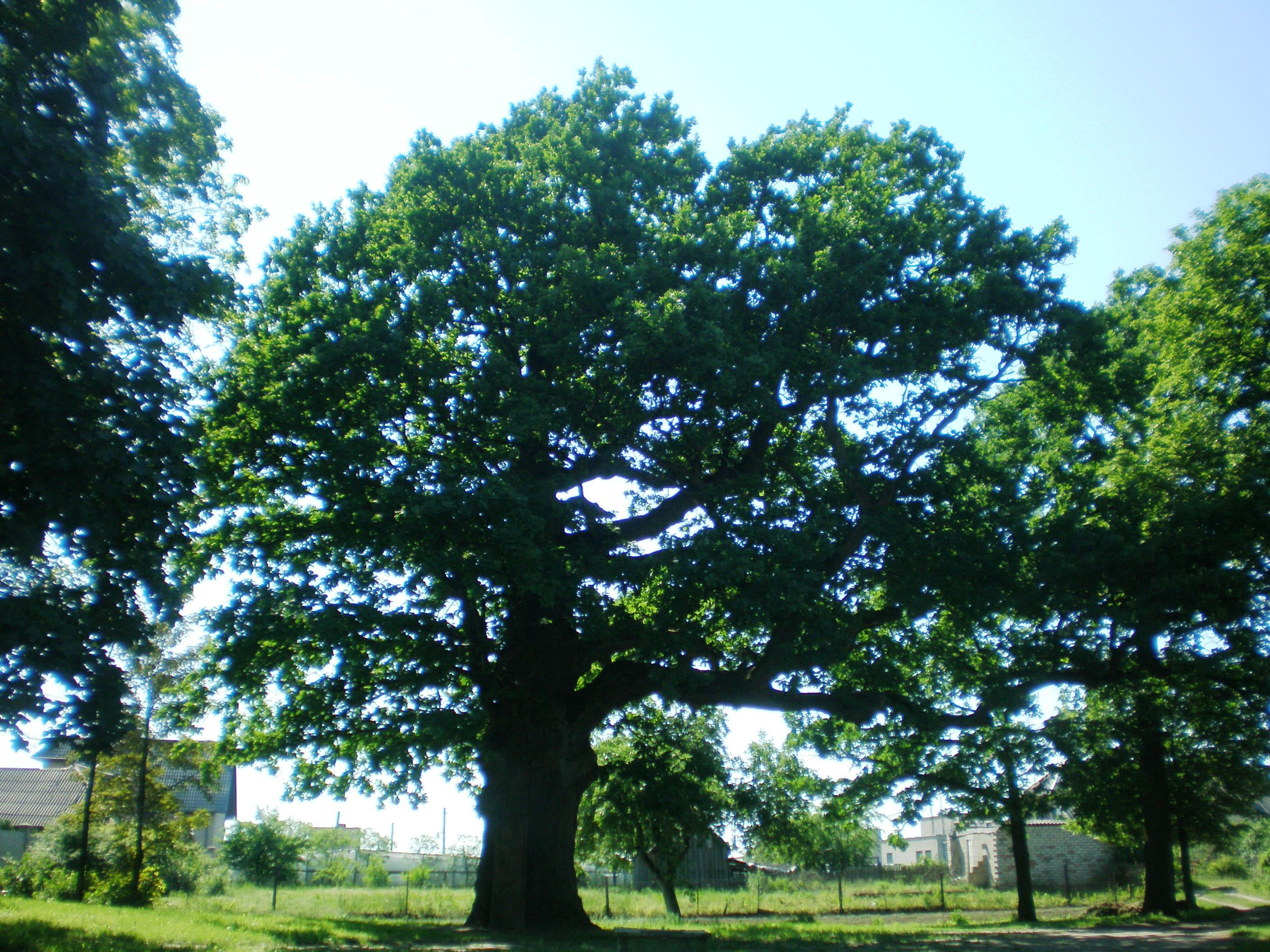
Daukša's Oak in Babėnai

Daukša was born between 1527 and 1538 in Babėnai (?), Grand Duchy of Lithuania. Daukša probably received his education in Vilnius and at one of the Western European Universities. He spoke several languages and had a personal library including books by Erasmus of Rotterdam and Philip Melanchthon.

Daukša was a canon of Medininkai (nowadays Varniai) and an official member of the Samogitia. Under the auspices of bishop Merkelis Giedraitis, he translated the catechism by the Spanish Jesuit theologist Jacobo Ledesma. The postil, translated from the Polish translation by Jakub Wujek, was published in 1595, and became one of the means to fight paganism. Paganism was at that time still practiced in Lithuania. The work also served to counter the growing threat posed to Catholicism by the Reformation, which was promoted in Lithuania by the mighty Radziwiłł family. It was also the first book in Lithuanian to be printed in the Grand Duchy of Lithuania.

In 1599 Daukša published another important work, the Lithuanian translation of the Polish language collection of sermons by Jakub Wujek, the Catholic Postil. There are two prefaces to this work, one in Latin and one in Polish. In the Polish preface, Daukša advocates the promotion of the Lithuanian language in the Grand Duchy and gave a brief definition of the Lithuanian nation and state. According to Daukša, a nation is a community which is united by territory, customs and the same language. In Polish language preface Daukša addressed compatriots who had not yet encountered the tradition of the written Lithuanian language and used other languages in their daily lives. He praised the proficiency in the Polish language, which, in his opinion, was very widespread in Lithuania and "through the pleasant union of the Grand Duchy with the renowned Polish Crown, is almost natural to us." Moreover, Daukša claimed that in order to main their state the Lithuanians must use the Lithuanian language as the main language of the state, create laws, write books, study in schools. Furthermore, Daukša in his 1599 Postil wrote that "Although, to be honest, there are few of us, especially the more noble ones, who do not know Polish and cannot read sermons written in Polish, in my opinion, there are mostly those who do not understand Polish or have only a poor knowledge of it." The book is regarded as more valuable and important than the Catechism, and constitutes one of the monuments of the Lithuanian language.

In his translations, Daukša used the central High Lithuanian dialect, influenced by both eastern High Lithuanian and Samogitian. As one of pioneers of written Lithuanian, he is credited with the introduction of several neologisms, among them mokytojas (teacher), valia (will), įkvėpimas (inspiration) and išmintis (wisdom). Of special importance for our knowledge of the Lithuanian language are the accent signs Daukša employs in the Postilla.

In 2024, the main-belt asteroid 633225 Dauksa was named after him.
