= Jonas Bretkūnas =

Prussian Lutheran pastor and writer (1536–1602)

Jonas Bretkūnas, Johann(es) Bretke, also known as Bretkus (born 1536 in Bammeln near Friedland – 1602 Königsberg was a Lutheran pastor and was one of the best known developers of the written Lithuanian language. He translated the Bible into Lithuanian, was the author of twelve Lithuanian books, and a historian as well.

== Biography ==
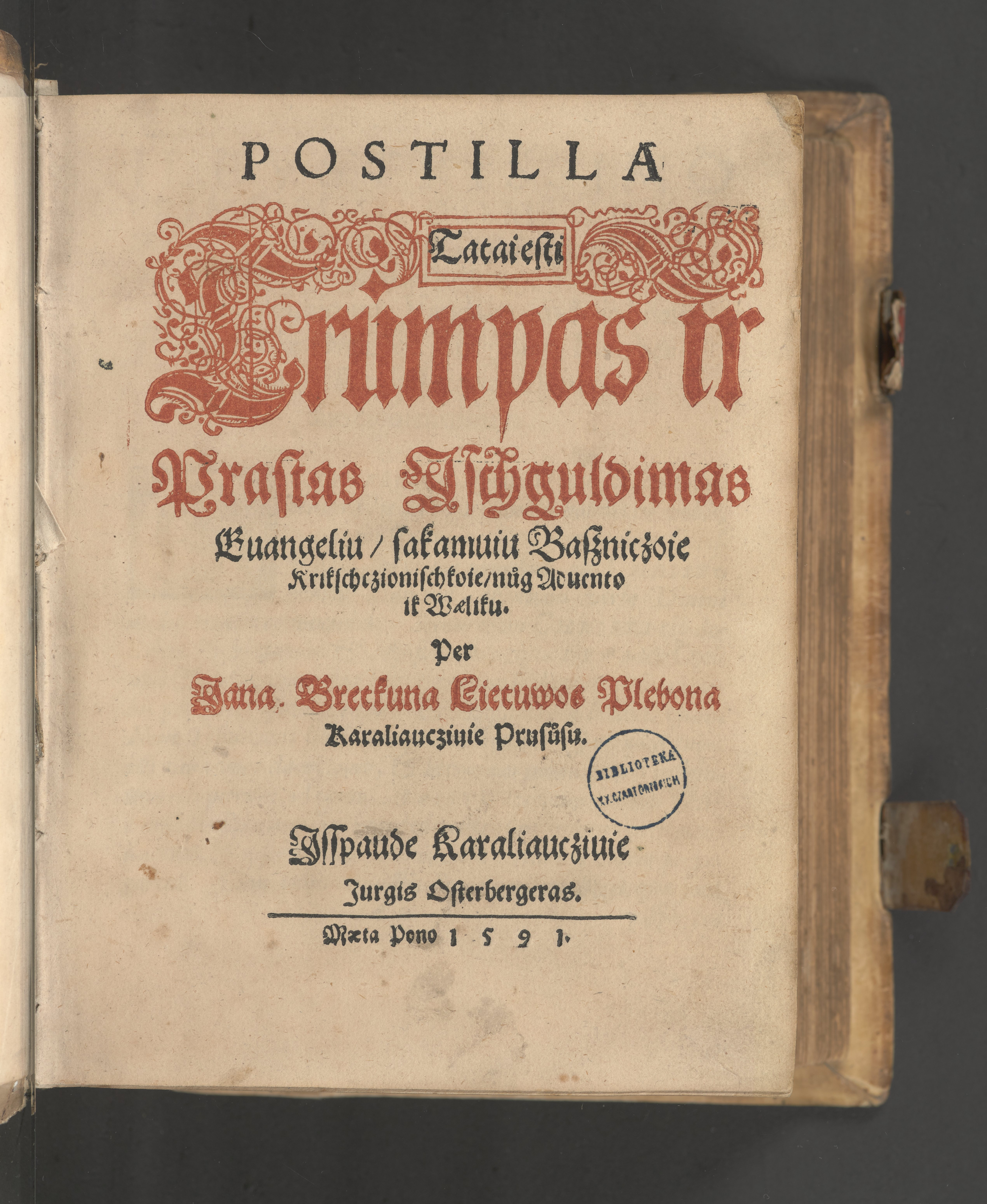
Postilla, signed "per Jana Bretkuna Lietuwos Plebona Karaliaucziuie Prusůsu"

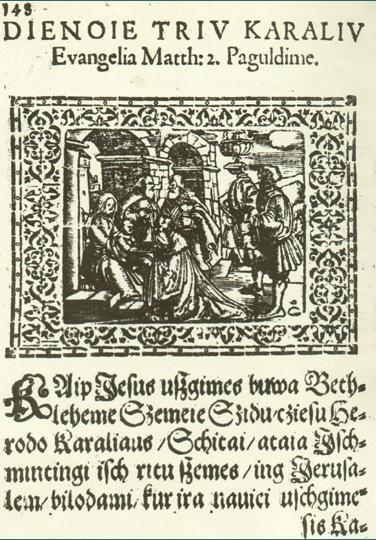
Another page of Postilė

Jonas Bretkūnas, Johann(es) Bretke was born in Bammeln (now in Pravdinsky District) in the Duchy of Prussia (a fief of Poland) in 1536. His father was German (according to Gerullis) or Germanized Prussian, and his mother from a native Prussian family. The language spoken in the area was primarily German, while Jonas Bretkūnas' mother tongues were Old Prussian and Lithuanian. Lithuanian language was also used in state chancellery as well. Different people, who had come to Lutheran Prussia did at the time, because the Lutherans had promised to preach in languages people understood rather than Latin. The Duke of Prussia therefore arranged for the education and studies of languages for pastors. In 1544, Duke Albrecht, had founded the Albertina University in Königsberg (Karaliaučius) and the area became one of the centers of learning for the neighboring peoples of Lithuania, Latvia and Poland, none of them had bibles in their language up to that time. As the Duke of Ducal Prussia, the first Lutheran state, Albrecht supported the translations of the Bible into these languages.

In 1555, when Bretkūnas was nineteen years of age, he began studying theology at the university of Königsberg. In 1556, he transferred to Wittenberg University. During his studies, in 1562, he was appointed a Lutheran pastor at Labiau (Labguva) (now Polessk) by Duke Albert. He was the first pastor at Labiau who could give sermons in Prussian and the Lithuanian language. Before that pastors often employed Tolken, who translated the sermons directly to the congregation. In 1563, Bretke married Frl. von Werthern. It was a rural, poor parish and pastors were expected to make their own living by receiving some farm land. Bretkūnas was not at all inclined to farming and wanted to spend all his time on language studies and translations. In 1579, he started translating the handwritten Bible from German using Martin Luther's analog, and the translation took more than ten years to complete, with tens of thousands of correction notes. Between 1578 and 1579, he wrote the Chronicles of Prussian Lands (Chronicon des Landes Preussen) in German.

After living twenty-five meager years in Labiau, Bretke (Jonas Bretkūnas) applied for a position as pastor at another Prussian town, but was in 1587 transferred to a Lithuanian language parish in Königsberg as pastor. He continued with his translation of the Bible and other scholarly works. In 1589, he published several new works, in particular "Giesmes duchaunos" (Spiritual Hymns), based on Martynas Mažvydas' works, as well as a small collection of hymns called "Kancionalas netukriu giesmiu", and a prayer book translation from German into Lithuanian "Kollectas", all printed by Georg Osterberg of Königsberg.

On November 29, 1590, Bretke-Bretkūnas finally completed his translation of the Bible (Old and New Testaments). It is the first surviving translation of the Bible into the Lithuanian language. The matter of publishing this Bible was discussed by the Lutheran college, but he failed to receive permission to publish it. Later the manuscripts of the Bretkūnas Bible were purchased by Duke Georg Friedrich. In 1591, he finished the Postilla (Postilė), one of his best known works, consisting of two parts. In his final years Bretkūnas continued to unsuccessfully lobby for the publication of his Bible, but in 1602 he died.

== Notable works of Johannes Bretke/Jonas Bretkūnas ==
- Chronicon des Landes Preussen, 1578–1579
- Giesmės duchaunas, 1589
- Kollectas, alba Paspalitas Maldas, 1589
- Kancionalas nekurių giesmių, 1589
- Biblia, 1590
- Postilla, tatai esti trumpas ir prastas išguldimas evangeliu, 1591

Examples of surviving manuscripts or books can be found in Germany, Lithuania and Sweden. His Postilla work is kept at Vilnius University, Lithuania. The only one surviving example of "Kancionalas netukriu giesmiu" is at Uppsala University, Sweden. Bretkūnas' Bible is kept in Prussian Privy State Archive, Berlin, Germany. In 2002, in order to commemorate his translation, the original manuscripts of his Bible was brought to Lithuania from Germany, insured for more than 2,3 million euro.
