= Valens Acidalius =

German critic and poet (1567-1595)

Valens Acidalius (1567 – 25 May 1595), also known as Valtin Havekenthal, was a German critic and poet writing in the Latin language.

== Life ==
Acidalius was born in Wittstock, the son of a Lutheran pastor. He studied at the universities of Rostock, Greifswald and Helmstedt. Even in his early youth, his Latin poems caused a stir. In 1590 he accompanied his friend Daniel Bucretius (Daniel Rindfleisch) to Italy where he published his first literary work, an edition of Velleius Paterculus. Acidalius studied philosophy and medicine in Bologna and was awarded a doctorate degree in both disciplines.

He was however not attracted by the practical work as a medic and therefore concentrated on the criticism of classic works. He returned to Germany in 1593 after several fever attacks, moving to Breslau, the home town of his friend Bucretius. In 1595 Acidalius became a Catholic and in spring of the same year, he accepted an invitation of his friend and supporter, the episcopal chancellor Wacker von Wackenfels to Neisse. He died there of a fever at the age of 28.

== Publications ==
- Velleius Paterculus, 1590, Padua
- Animadversiones in Curtium, 1594, Frankfurt

Posthumously:

- a collection of poems, elegies, odes and epigrams, 1603, Liegnitz
- Centuria prima epistolarum, 1606, Hanau
- Divinationes et interpretationes in comoedias Plauti, 1607, Frankfurt, 566 pages
- Notae in Taciti opera, 1607, Hannover
- Notae in Panegyrici veteres, 1607, Heidelberg

Disputed:

- Disputatio nova contra mulieres, qua probatur eas homines non esse, 1595, probably printed in Zerbst, 11 sheets 4°. A tract which caused much annoyance among the theologians of the time because of its blasphemic precepts. His attackers overlooked the fact that the tract was intended as a parody on the Socinian methods of refuting the divine nature of Christ. During his lifetime, Acidalius denied having written these papers. It is believed that while Acidalius did not actually write the tract, he was nevertheless instrumental in its creation. Thus, the actual author remains anonymous.
  - Czapla, Ralf G. [Ed.]; Burkard, Georg [Ed.]; Burkard, Georg [Trans.]: Disputatio nova contra mulieres, qua probatur eas homines non esse / Acidalius, Valens. (Neue Disputation gegen die Frauen zum Erweis, dass sie keine Menschen sind). Heidelberg 2006. ISBN 3-934877-51-6

== Sources ==
- Allgemeine Deutsche Biographie—online version at German Wikisource
