= Merkelis Petkevičius =

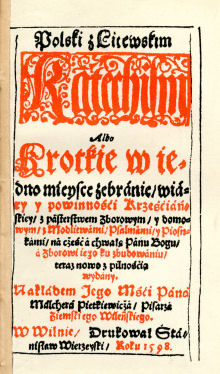
Title page of the catechism (1598)

Merkelis Petkevičius (Polish: Melchior Pietkiewicz; c. 1550–1608) was a Reformation (Calvinist) activist in the Grand Duchy of Lithuania. He was a nobleman who worked as a court scribe in Vilnius for almost thirty years. In 1598, he published the first Lithuanian-language Protestant book printed in the Grand Duchy of Lithuania (the first Lithuanian Protestant book was printed in Konigsberg in 1547 by Martynas Mažvydas). This book, a bilingual catechism in Polish and Lithuanian, was published in response to the publication of the Roman Catholic catechism of Mikalojus Daukša. However, book's heavy, artificial language with numerous loanwords make it linguistically inferior to Daukša's work.

== Biography ==
Petkevičius was born to a wealthy family of Lithuanian nobles around 1550. According to the military census of 1528, his grandfather Grigas Petkevičius had to send four men to the army in case of war. Petkevičius' father Jonas had manors near Maišiagala and Salakas. Orphaned as a teen, he was raised by his uncle Motiejus, cup-bearer of Lithuania, who had a manor in Panevėžiukas. Based on analysis of Petkevičius language, linguist Zigmas Zinkevičius determined that he grew up in that area.

Petkevičius knew several languages (Lithuanian, Latin, Polish, Chancery Slavonic) and held various offices: tax collector (1580), scribe of Vilnius Court (1581–1608), starosta of Raseiniai (before 1586–1599), secretary of the Lithuanian Tribunal when it met in Vilnius. He owned a house in Vilnius as well as several manors around Maišiagala, Giedraičiai, Salakas. He sponsored the construction of a Protestant church in Glitiškės. He was married twice. Three sons from the first marriage became students of the Protestant University of Königsberg in 1596. His second wife was widowed Darata Jokūbaitė Giedraitytė, cousin of Bishop Merkelis Giedraitis.

In 1598, Petkevičius established his own press in Vilnius specifically for the purpose of printing Protestant books. First he published a Polish book by Gregory of Żarnowiec on teachings of Paul the Apostle (a copy is kept by the National Library of Poland), and then he published bilingual catechism in Polish and Lithuanian. The press was very expensive to maintain and it is believed that Petkevičius sold it to brothers Sultzeris. Petkevičius was a member of the laity and he published religious texts on his own initiative. The first Lithuanian Protestant books published in the Grand Duchy of Lithuania, unlike the Lithuanian Protestant books published in the Duchy of Prussia almost fifty years earlier, were a result of individual efforts of nobles and not of the clergymen or the synod.

Petkevičius died in Vilnius in early 1608 when the Lithuanian Tribunal was in session.

== Catechism ==
=== Publication history ===
The catechism is titled in Polish (Polski z litewskim katechism) and is a truncated version of the Polish catechism most likely prepared by Stanisław Sudrowski and printed in Vilnius in 1595 (its title page is missing which makes it hard to determine its author or date of publication). In turn, Sudrowski's work drew from the Polish catechism sponsored by Mikołaj "the Black" Radziwiłł and printed in Nesvizh in 1563. Petkevičius' catechism was expanded and republished as Kniga Nobaznistes (1653).

The catechism was found and published by Aleksander Brückner in Archiv für slavische Philologie in 1891. A photocopied edition was prepared and published by Juozas Balčikonis in 1939. The copy was kept at a city library in Gdańsk, but it disappeared during World War II. After the war, a new copy was found in Gotha and is currently kept at the Gotha Research Library (German: Forschungsbibliothek Gotha). In 1970, linguist Jonas Kruopas published a dictionary of all words used in the catechism.

=== Content ===
The catechism of Petkevičius is printed in Polish on the left and in Lithuanian on the right. Such format was likely intended to assist the clergymen, who were often Polish and knew little Lithuanian, in learning the Lithuanian language. The text also includes an 8-line poem urging the children to learn. As such, the book was likely intended for both audiences – the clergy and the students. Each language contains 252 pages. The book starts with a Polish foreword which emphasizes the need of catechisms in local languages to reach the faithful but, unlike Mikalojus Daukša, does not advocate switching back from Polish to Lithuanian. In addition to basic catechism, the book includes prayers, 93 hymns, 40 psalms (one psalm translated twice), and Agenda. The hymns and psalms were taken from various previous publications. Five of the hymns were taken from the Catechism of Martynas Mažvydas (1547). 27 of the psalms were taken from the Nesvizh catechism of 1563; two of them were translated to Polish by Mikołaj Rej. Six other psalms were translated by Jan Kochanowski. The Lithuanian translation of the psalms attempted to keep the same number of syllables so that they could be sung to the same music.

The Lithuanian translation is consistent and reflects the same Aukštaitian dialect as Daukša's work. However, the word-by-word translation from Polish led to stilled and artificial language full of loanwords (almost a quarter of vocabulary is loanwords). As such, it is of much lower linguistic quality and importance than works by Daukša. However, the prayers were not translated by Petkevičius but taken from already existing translations. Thus their language is much more archaic and with much less loanwords. Linguist Zigmas Zinkevičius determined that these translations date back to the 13th century when King Mindaugas converted to Christianity.
