= Aukštaitian dialect =

Lithuanian dialect

Aukštaitian
- aukštaičių tarmė
- Native to: Lithuania
- Region: Aukštaitija, Dzūkija and Suvalkija
- Language family: Indo-European: Balto-Slavic; Baltic; East Baltic; Lithuanian; Aukštaitian

Language codes
- ISO 639-3: –
- Glottolog: auks1239

Aukštaitian (Lithuanian: aukštaičių tarmė) is one of the dialects of the Lithuanian language, spoken in the ethnographic regions of Aukštaitija, Dzūkija and Suvalkija. It became the basis for the standard Lithuanian language.

== Classification ==
Map of the sub-dialects of the Aukštaitian dialect (Zinkevičius and Girdenis, 1965). Western Aukštaitian Sub-dialect of Šiauliai Sub-dialect of Kaunas Sub-dialect of Klaipėda Region Eastern Aukštaitian Sub-dialect of Panevėžys Sub-dialect of Širvintos Sub-dialect of Anykščiai Sub-dialect of Kupiškis Sub-dialect of Utena Sub-dialect of Vilnius Southern Aukštaitian Southern Aukštaitian or Dzūkian sub-dialect

Revised classification of the dialects, proposed in 1965 by linguists Zigmas Zinkevičius and Aleksas Girdenis, divides the Aukštaitian dialect into three sub-dialects based on pronunciation of the mixed diphthongs an, am, en, em and the ogonek vowels ą and ę:

Western Aukštaitian – most similar to standard Lithuanian – preserves both the diphthongs and the vowels. It is further subdivided into two sub-dialects:

- The Kaunas sub-dialect is spoken mostly in Suvalkija. This sub-dialect separates long and short vowels pretty well and properly stresses word endings.
- The Šiauliai sub-dialect is spoken in a strip between Samogitia and Aukštaitija. This sub-dialect almost always shortens unaccented long vowels (dumẽlis instead of dūmelis 'little smoke', vãgis instead of vagys 'thieves', lãpu instead of lapų 'leaves') and moves the accent mark from the end of the word (ràsa instead of rasà 'dew', tỹliu instead of tyliù 'I am silent', žmònos instead of žmonõs 'wives').

Southern Aukštaitian preserves the diphthong, but replaces ą and ę with ų and į (žųsis instead of žąsis 'goose', skįsta instead of skęsta 'drowns'). It is spoken mostly in Dzūkija and therefore is known as the Dzūkian dialect.

Eastern Aukštaitian replaces the diphthongs with either un, um, in, im or on, om, ėn, ėm (pasumda instead of pasamdo 'hiring', romstis instead of ramstis 'support'). The ogonek vowels are replaced with either ų, į or o, ę/ė (grųštas or groštas instead of grąžtas 'drill', grįšt instead of gręžti 'to drill'). It is mostly spoken in Aukštaitija. It is further subdivided into six sub-dialects.

== Language contact in border regions ==
In the southeastern borderland of Lithuania (Šalčininkai District) and the northwestern borderland of Belarus (Voranava District), the Southern Aukštaitian subdialect has undergone significant morphological changes due to prolonged contact with the local Belarusian vernacular (often referred to as po prostu). According to sociolinguistic research conducted between 1964 and 2017, the Lithuanian dialect in these areas is experiencing a "language death" process, where it is gradually being replaced by the Slavic vernacular, especially among the middle and younger generations.

The structural decay of the dialect in this contact zone is characterized by:

- Gender instability: Bilingual speakers often assign grammatical gender to Lithuanian nouns based on the gender of the corresponding word in the local Belarusian dialect. For instance, abstract nouns that are traditionally feminine in Lithuanian may be treated as masculine if the Belarusian equivalent is masculine (e.g., using masculine endings for abstract concepts).
- Morphological interference in verbs: The reflexive particle, which typically acts as an infix in standard Lithuanian or prefixed verbs, is frequently moved to the end of the word (e.g., nepjaunasi instead of nesipjauna), mirroring the structure of Slavic reflexive verbs. Additionally, the frequent past tense is often expressed using the particle būdavo (similar to the Belarusian byvalo) as an interjection rather than through standard morphological conjugation.

== Sources ==
- Jašinskienė, Janina, ed. (2005). Tradicijos. Iliustruota Lietuvos enciklopedija (in Lithuanian). Kaunas: Šviesa. p. 55. ISBN 5-430-04158-0.
