= St. John's Street, Vilnius =

Street in Vilnius, Lithuania

St. John's Street
- Interactive map of St. John's Street
- Native name: Švento Jono gatvė (Lithuanian)
- Former names: S. Johangasse, Ivanovskaya (Russian: Ивановская), Świętojańska, Balio Sruogos
- Length: 190 m (620 ft)
- Location: Vilnius, Lithuania
- Postal code: LT-01123

St. John's Street (Lithuanian: Švento Jono gatvė) is one of the oldest streets in the Vilnius Old Town, named after Church of St. Johns, which connects Pilies Street with the intersection of Universiteto, Gaono and Dominikonų streets and Konstantinas Sirvydas Square.

== History ==
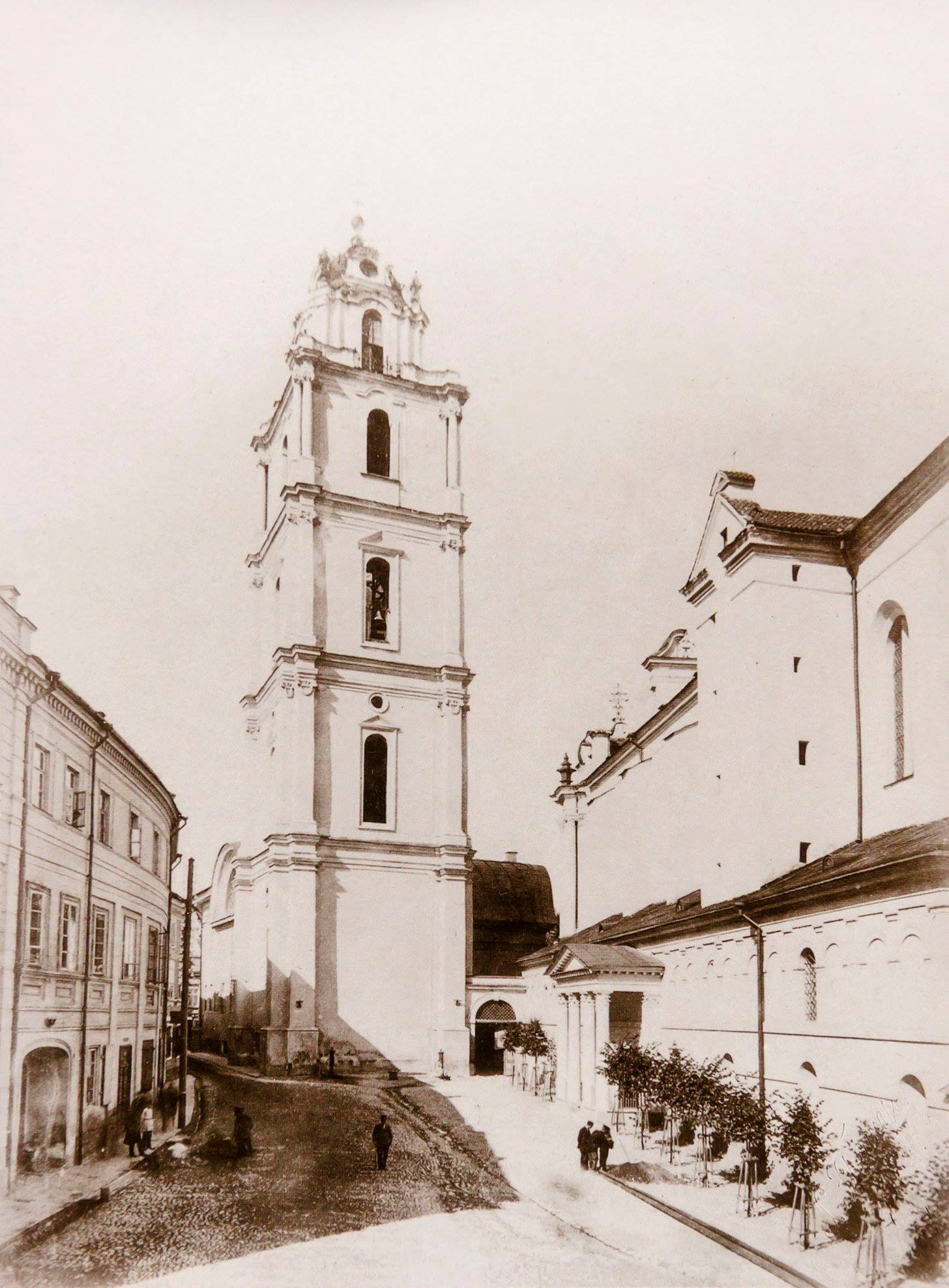
The street in 1896

The street in 1900

St. John's Street took shape in the 16th century, following the development of buildings in the site of Vilnius's first market square. Many houses on this street belonged to the Vilnius Cathedral Chapter, the bishops of Vilnius, or Vilnius University.

Turning from Pilies Street onto St. John's Street, one sees a concrete building from the late 20th century on the left. It stands on the site of the former Kardynalia Palace, which was severely damaged during World War II and in 1956 was demolished by Soviet authorities. From the mid-16th century, the palace belonged to the Lithuanian Grand Marshal Mikołaj Radziwiłł the Black. It was subsequently inherited by his son Jerzy Radziwiłł, the future Bishop of Vilnius and the first Lithuanian cardinal. From his time onwards, the palace was known as the "Cardinal's Palace" (Lithuanian: kardinalija). In the 19th century, the palace passed into the hands of the Russian Empire's postal service. The historic palace's Gothic basements partly survived.

The building at 11 St. John's Street is known as the Ruseckas House. It consisted of three wings surrounding an enclosed courtyard.

The house at 9 St. John's Street was granted by the Jesuits in the 17th century to Jerzy Ertli, a Vilnius's master mason. The Jesuits gifted the house in recognition of his work rebuilding St. John's Church, which had been damaged during the war with Russia. Later, the house passed to Vilnius University. Between 1807 and 1812, the Bishop of Vilnius, Hieronim Stroynowski, resided there. Subsequently, the building was leased to the editorial offices of newspapers Kurier Wileński and Dziennik Wileński. Ertli also purchased the house at 7 St. John's Street, he restored the building and sold it. Since then, the house has changed owners, and the building has burned down more than once.

In 1629, a residence for pious widows and unmarried women was established in the building at 5 St. John's Street. Later, the building was acquired by the pharmacist Schulz. During the war with Russia, the house was destroyed, and its owner was killed.

The street in 1937

The Vilnius Academy printing house was established in the building at 4 St. John's Street. It had been gifted to the Jesuits by Mikołaj Krzysztof Radziwiłł the Orphan. The printing house printed multiple languages books, including the Lithuanian language books. Following the suppression of the Jesuit Order, the printing house passed to the Main School of Lithuania and later to Vilnius University. In 1805, publisher Józef Zawadzki purchased the printing house from Vilnius University.

The building at 3 St. John's Street belonged to the Lithuanian noble Wołłowicz family. In the 17th century, it was purchased by Lithuanian Grand Treasurer Stefan Pac, a patron who supported the establishment of the Discalced Carmelites in Vilnius. The Sapieha family acquired the building in the 18th century, subsequently remodeling and embellishing it. Originally a two-story Baroque building was later expanded with a third story – the palace featured an ornate façade adorned with stepped pilasters and decorative moldings. Following the November Uprising against Russia, the palace was confiscated from Franciszek Sapieha, an anti-Russian participant in the uprising, and transferred to various institutions of Russian Empire. The building housed a printing press where the Tsar's manifesto abolishing serfdom was printed in 1863. During the 19th century, the Office of the Civil Governor of Vilna Governorate was located there. In the interwar period, starting in 1918, the Lithuanian Rūta Society operated in the building for a time, as well as the Lithuanian Švyturys bookstore was also established there and operated until 1923 when it was relocated to the Lithuanian temporary capital Kaunas. During the Soviet occupation of Lithuania period, the building served as the Palace of Culture for Postal Workers and it underwent reconstruction in 1986. Later the Embassy of Poland in Lithuania purchased the palace from Lietuvos paštas and continues to operate there to this day.

In the Soviet period the street was named after the Lithuanian writer Balys Sruoga.

A Jesuit pharmacy operated at 2 St. John's Street from the 17th century. The Lithuanian architect Laurynas Gucevičius since 1782 had lived in the last house on St. John's Street, situated on the corner of Gaono Street, however in 1944 it burned down and trees were planted on the site of the ruins.

== Current state ==
The street at night in 2006

The street is short, approximately 190 metres length, rising up a small hill and then descending slightly at the intersection with three other Vilnius streets. The street surface is paved with blocks, and the current house number is 13.

Located on St. John's Street are the Communications Workers' Cultural Centre, Lithuanian Post (No. 3), the European Business Information Centre Vilnius (No. 3), the Vilnius Bookbinders' Guild (No. 4), the Lithuanian Institute (No. 5), the Secretariat of the Lithuanian National Commission for UNESCO (No. 11), the St. John's Street Gallery (No. 11), the Vilnius University Science Museum (No. 12), and the Church of St. Johns (No. 12).

In a small area created opposite the street-level gallery, a sculpture by Vytautas Nalivaika depicting a human surging upwards stands atop a post.

Several memorial plaques are displayed on the street. A plaque dedicated to the Vilnius's printer Józef Zawadzki hangs on the building No. 4, it also notes that Adam Mickiewicz's first book of poetry, Ballads and Romances, was printed there in 1822. Additionally, there is a plaque commemorating the 400th anniversary of the Vilnius University Library.

== See also ==
- St John's Street (disambiguation)
