= Kardynalia Palace =

Kardynalia (Radziwiłł) Palace
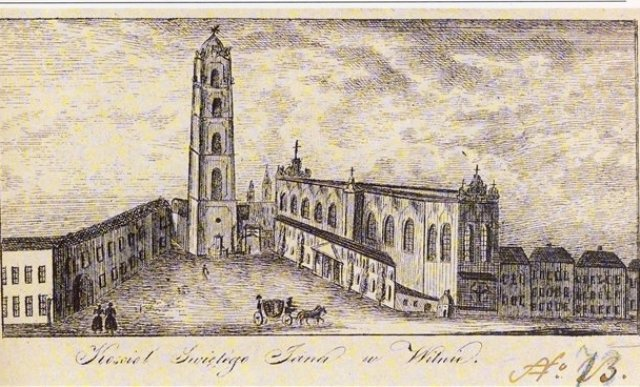
- Kardynalia Palace (on the left), next to the St. Johns' Church
- Interactive map of the Kardynalia (Radziwiłł) Palace area

General information
- Location: Vilnius, Vilnius, Lithuania
- Coordinates: 54.68202°N 25.288287°E
- Year built: 1541-1609
- Destroyed: 1944/1956

Kardynalia Palace is a no-longer-existing palace in Vilnius, located at the corner of Pilies and St. John's Streets, right next to the university Church of St. Johns. The palace was constructed between the 16th and 17th centuries for the Radziwiłł family. One of its owners at the time was Cardinal and Bishop of Vilnius Jerzy Radziwiłł, from whom the palace derived its name.

The palace remained in the possession of the Radziwiłłs for about 300 years, and in the 19th century, it became a government building. Damaged in 1944, it was not rebuilt after World War II, and in 1956, the palace's remnants were demolished to make way for residential buildings.

== History ==
From 1540, Mikołaj Radziwiłł the Black rented a complex of buildings at the Castle and St. John's Streets from the Vilnius canons, previously occupied by the Bishop of Kyiv Jan Filipowicz. In 1542, by right of escheat, he took possession of the adjacent Goštautai tenement house, though the buildings were not merged at that time. A Calvinist congregation was established in the tenement. After his death, the part formerly owned by Filipowicz was inherited by Mikołaj Krzysztof Radziwiłł, while the Gasztołd portion went to the future cardinal Jerzy Radziwiłł. After converting to Catholicism, Jerzy dissolved the congregation and turned the tenement into a Jesuit-managed seminary.

In 1586, the cardinal became the owner of both parts, and in 1593, he transferred them to his two-year-old nephew Albrecht Radziwiłł. Around 1600, the entire complex was renovated, likely at the initiative of Albrecht’s mother, Anna née Kettler. The Gasztołd part became the Radziwiłł family residence, while the Filipowicz part was rented out. The palace section was an impressive two-story representative structure with a gateway on St. John's Street and a façade topped with an attic. The courtyard featured a garden, brick kitchen and stable buildings, and wooden galleries. The rental section was much simpler, made of wood or a mix of brick and wood.

The palace was damaged in the great Vilnius fire of 1610 and during the Muscovite occupation. In 1677, it passed to the Nesvizh branch of the Radziwiłł family. Katarzyna née Sobieska, widow of Michał Kazimierz, oversaw its renovation and repairs after 1687. Soon after, the palace ceased to be the primary residence of the Radziwiłłs, who mainly resided in the Voivode’s Palace on Troki Street. Additionally, the palace suffered from fires in 1737 and 1748, requiring repairs each time. In 1777, Teofilia Konstancja Morawska, daughter of Michał Kazimierz "Rybeńko", moved into the palace. She refurbished it according to the "latest trends" and housed a collection of art and natural history specimens gathered from her travels across Europe. Subsequent residents included her brother Karol Stanisław "Panie Kochanku" Radziwiłł and his son Dominik Hieronim Radziwiłł.

After Dominik, the palace was inherited by his daughter Stefania, wife of Ludwig von Wittgenstein. It was primarily used for rental purposes, with tenants including writers Jan Czeczot and Tomasz Zan. In 1850, the Russian government purchased the palace for use as a post and telegraph office. This led to a complete renovation, including the addition of a third floor and a redesign of the façade facing Castle Street.

The palace was destroyed in 1944 during German-Soviet fighting for the city. In 1956, its remains were demolished, leaving only the single-tract eastern wing and cellars. In 1979, a residential and commercial building designed by Aleksandras Lukšas was erected on the site.

== Bibliography ==
- Czyż, Anna Sylwia (2021). Palaces of Vilnius in the 17th–18th Centuries. Warsaw: National Institute of Polish Cultural Heritage Abroad POLONIKA.
