= Świętojańska Street =

Świętojańska, literally, "St. John's" may refer to the following streets:

- Świętojańska Street, Białystok, Poland
- Świętojańska Street in Bydgoszcz, Poland
- Świętojańska Street in Warsaw, Poland
- Świętojańska Street in Gdańsk, Poland
- Świętojańska Street in Gdynia, Poland
- Ulica Świętojańska is the Polish name of the Švento Jono Street, Vilnius, Lithuania
