= Church of St. Johns, Vilnius =

Coordinates: 54°40′57″N 25°17′18″E

Church of St. Johns
- Church of St. Johns, St. John the Baptist and St. John the Apostle and Evangelist
- Lithuanian: Šv. Jono Krikštytojo ir Šv. Jono apaštalo ir evangelisto bažnyčia
- Main façade at Vilnius University Great Courtyard
- Click on the map for a fullscreen view
- Location: Vilnius
- Country: Lithuania
- Denomination: Catholic
- Tradition: Latin Church
- Religious order: Society of Jesus
- Website: www.jonai.lt

History
- Founder: Grand Duke Jogaila
- Dedication: John the Baptist and John the Apostle
- Consecrated: 1427

Architecture
- Functional status: Active
- Heritage designation: Part of the Vilnius Historic Centre (World Heritage Site, 1994)
- Architect(s): Johann Christoph Glaubitz, Karol Podczaszyński
- Architectural type: Church
- Style: Gothic, Baroque, Renaissance
- Years built: Original: 1388–1426; Current: 1738–1748

Specifications
- Materials: Plastered masonry, limestone, iron, copper, marble, granite

Administration
- Archdiocese: Roman Catholic Archdiocese of Vilnius

The Church of St. Johns (Lithuanian: Šv. Jonų bažnyčia), (Note: in other languages also known as: Latin: Ecclesia Sancti Ioannis, Ukrainian: Церква Святого Іоанна, Polish: Kościół Świętego Jana, Belarusian: Касцёл Святых Янаў, Russian: Костёл Святых Иоаннов.) officially named St. John the Baptist and St. John the Apostle and Evangelist (Lithuanian: Vilniaus Šv. Jono Krikštytojo ir Šv. Jono apaštalo ir evangelisto bažnyčia), is located at the Old Town of Vilnius, Lithuania and dominates the university (Vilnius University) ensemble. The church is dedicated to both John the Baptist and John the Evangelist. The church and its bell tower are prominent examples of the Vilnian Baroque, while its Baroque appearance was designed by architect Johann Christoph Glaubitz. The bell tower of the church with a height of 69-metre (226 ft) is the tallest building of the Vilnius Old Town.

Since the times of the Jesuit Academy professors and students used to pray here, and Vilnius theologians gave sermons. It was a place for performances and disputes, where thesis were defended and monarchs greeted. Since the 16th century it serves as a venue for the Vilnius University diploma awarding ceremonies upon students graduation. The church services in the church are held only in Lithuanian language. The church is also used for concerts.

== History ==
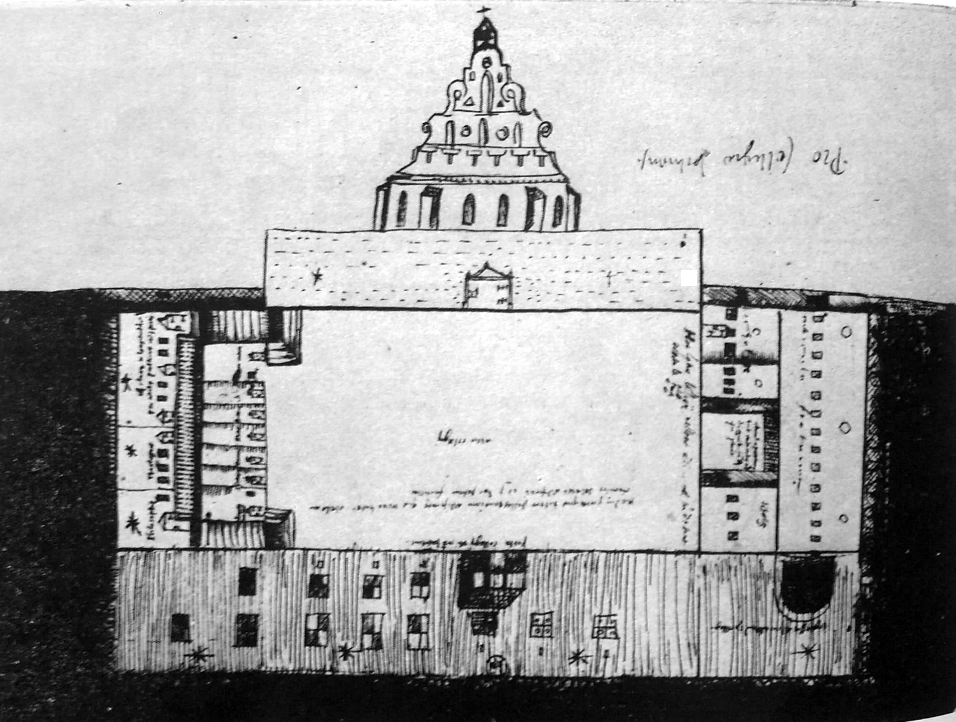
Gothic style Church of St. Johns in 1582

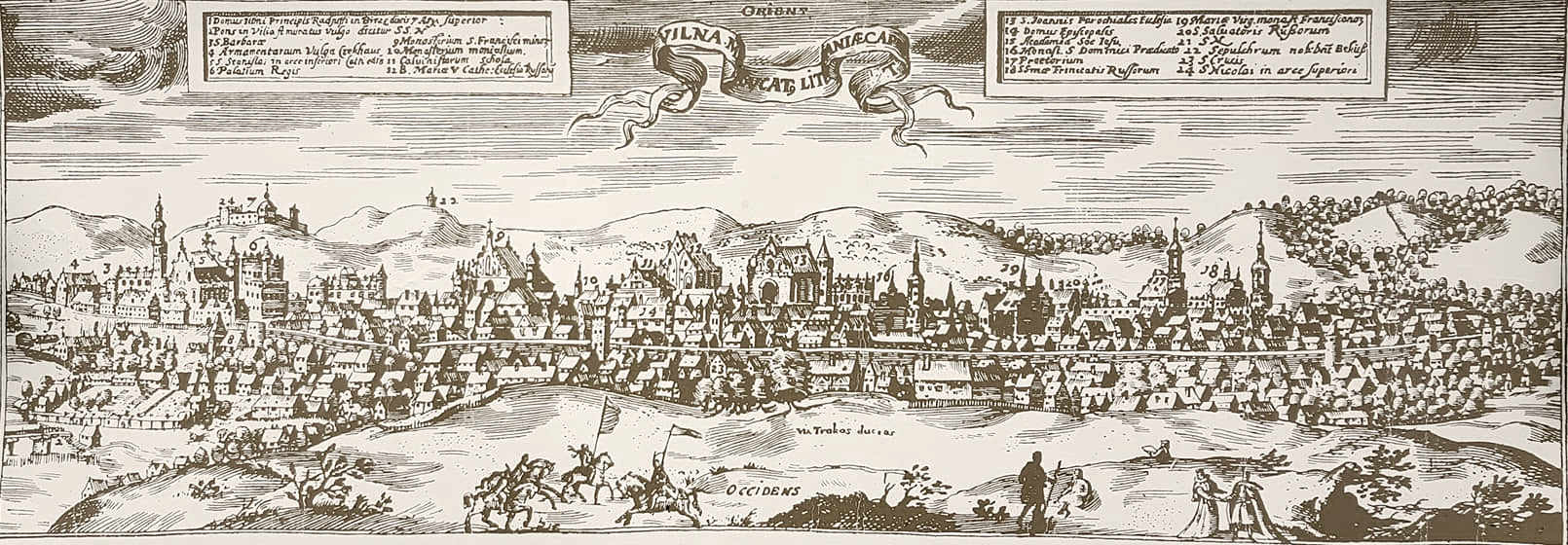
Panorama of Vilnius in 1600 with the Church of St. Johns marked as #13

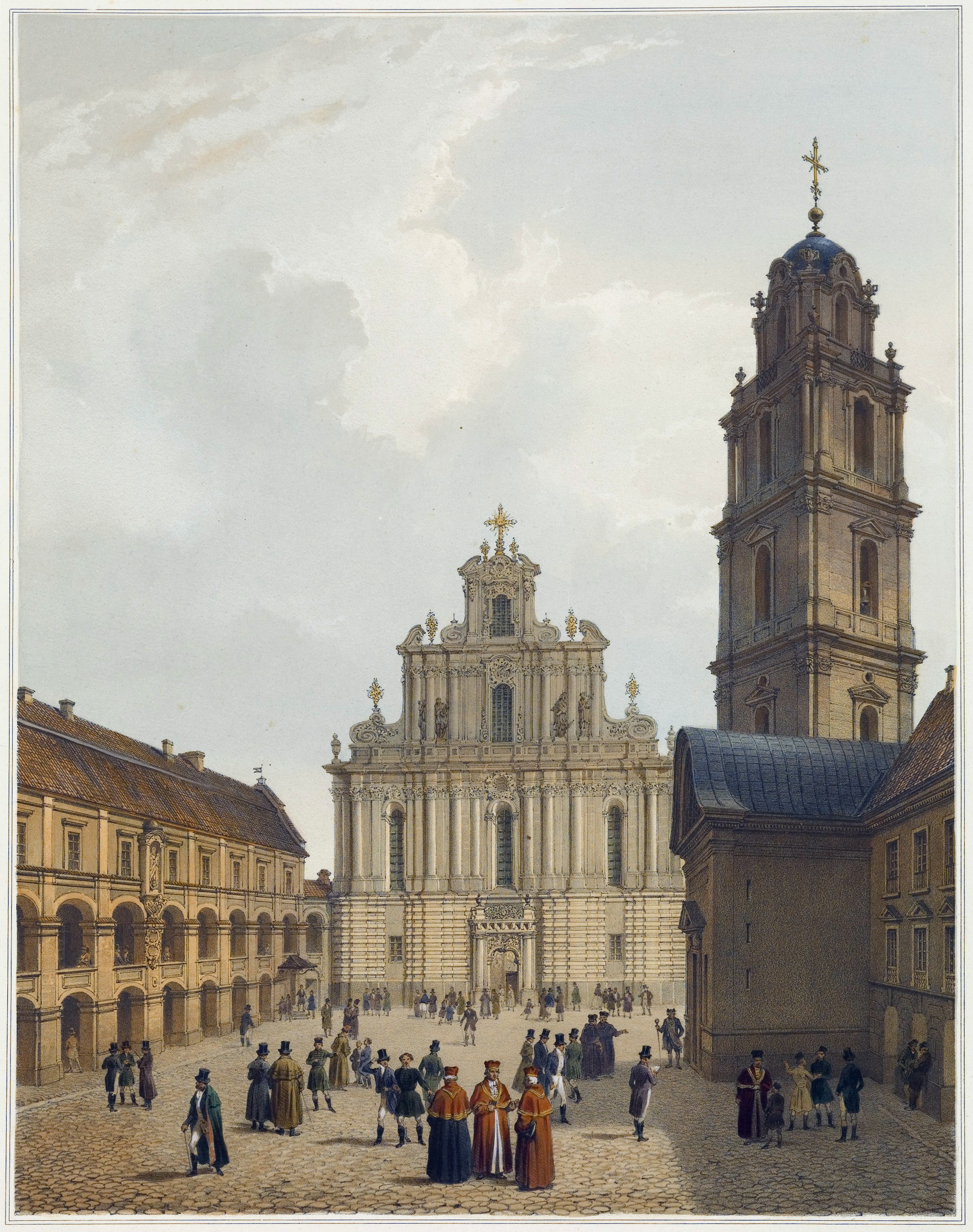
The Great Courtyard of Vilnius University with Baroque façades of the Church of St. Johns and its bell tower, painted in c. 1850

The beginning of the construction of the Church of St. Johns is associated with the Christianization of Lithuania. The first parish church – a Gothic masonry structure – was built between 1387 and 1426 at the intersection of the main streets of the Vilnius Old Town. Its construction was initiated by Lithuanian monarch Jogaila in 1386, however it was finished in 1426 under the rule of Lithuanian Grand Duke Vytautas the Great and was consecrated in 1427. Since its completion in the 15th century it served as the first parish church in Vilnius for townspeople and until the 19th century it remained the only parish church of Vilnius, excluding the city's suburbs that were springing up beyond the Wall of Vilnius. At the time the Vilnius Cathedral in the Vilnius Castle Complex was mostly dedicated to the Lithuanian monarchs and their courts. The church has basement crypts where people were buried in its walls since the early years of the church's establishment. In 1430, the first brotherhood operating in the church was mentioned in a written source whose members wanted to practice the spiritual life more actively and interact with one another. Towards the end of the 15th century, other early profession guilds (e.g. goldsmiths, barbers, and tailors) also established themselves in the church and they built their own chapels with dedicated altars where they gathered regularly for worship, which were conducted by specific priests assigned to these separate chapels. The church burned down in the 15th century and again in 1530. It was rebuilt after each fire, eventually becoming a key epicenter of the struggles between the Reformation and the Counter-Reformation in the mid-16th century, during the tenure of the prominent jurist Petras Rozijus.

Walerian Protasewicz, Bishop of Vilnius, invited the Jesuits to Vilnius where they arrived in 1569 and established a college. In 1571, the Church of St. Johns was transferred by Sigismund II Augustus, King of Poland and Grand Duke of Lithuania, to the Jesuits College, which later in 1579 was transformed into a Jesuits Academy of Vilnius (currently Vilnius University). Moreover, in 1571 a clay-rich plot near Riešė was allocated to the Jesuits for the establishment of a brickyard to supply the church reconstruction project. Although the building's fundamental Gothic architecture was preserved during the rebuilding, its overall volume changed significantly as the church was extended towards what is now St. John's Street. To adapt the space for the Jesuit Order's solemn academic and religious ceremonies, a new, wide presbytery featuring an ambulatory (a passageway circling the high altar) and a three-sided apse was constructed. After the reconstruction the church was continued to be used for religious purposes as prominent Jesuits: Piotr Skarga, Žygimantas Liauksminas, Maciej Kazimierz Sarbiewski, Albert Wijuk Kojałowicz, Konstantinas Sirvydas, Antanas Skorulskis preached sermons there. However, since 1579 the church was also used by academics as in it were held students debates, thesis defense, diploma awarding ceremonies, and theatrical performances were staged. In 1583, the first doctoral titles of the Vilnius Academy were awarded in a ceremonial event to Spaniards G. Alabian and A. Arias. In 1584, the first academic degrees (bachelor) in philosophy of the Vilnius Academy were awarded to six graduates. The Church of St. Johns was visited by monarchs of Lithuania and Poland (e.g. Stephen Báthory, Sigismund III Vasa, while Władysław IV Vasa and his sister Anna in July 1636 attended the awarding ceremony of doctoral title to Maciej Kazimierz Sarbiewski and during it Vasa himself awarded the doctoral ring to Sarbiewski).

In 1600–1610, a bell tower was constructed nearby the church and with a height of 69-metre (226 ft) it is the tallest building in the Vilnius Old Town.

The Church of St. Johns suffered damage in 1655 during the war with Muscovy, when its vaults collapsed, but the building was soon repaired. In 1700, the organ loft was reconstructed and a new organ was acquired. In 1702, the Swedish Imperial Army stole silver liturgical vessels from the church.

In the Church of St. Johns the Lithuanian language sermons were delivered until the 1730s. In 1737, the Church of St. Johns burned down and its bells melted. During the reconstruction, the façade and pediment gained Late Baroque architecture forms. The bell tower was raised in height following the 1737 fire. Fires in the city of Vilnius prompted the architect Johann Christoph Glaubitz to create a major reconstruction project for the sanctuary, which fundamentally altered the building's original Gothic silhouette. Thanks to Glaubitz, the church's façade and pediment acquired the fluid, undulating forms that became the hallmark of the Vilnian Baroque. Together with the significantly heightened bell tower, the ensemble became a majestic vertical landmark of the Vilnius Old Town, symbolizing the triumph of scholarship and faith risen from the ashes within the university grounds.

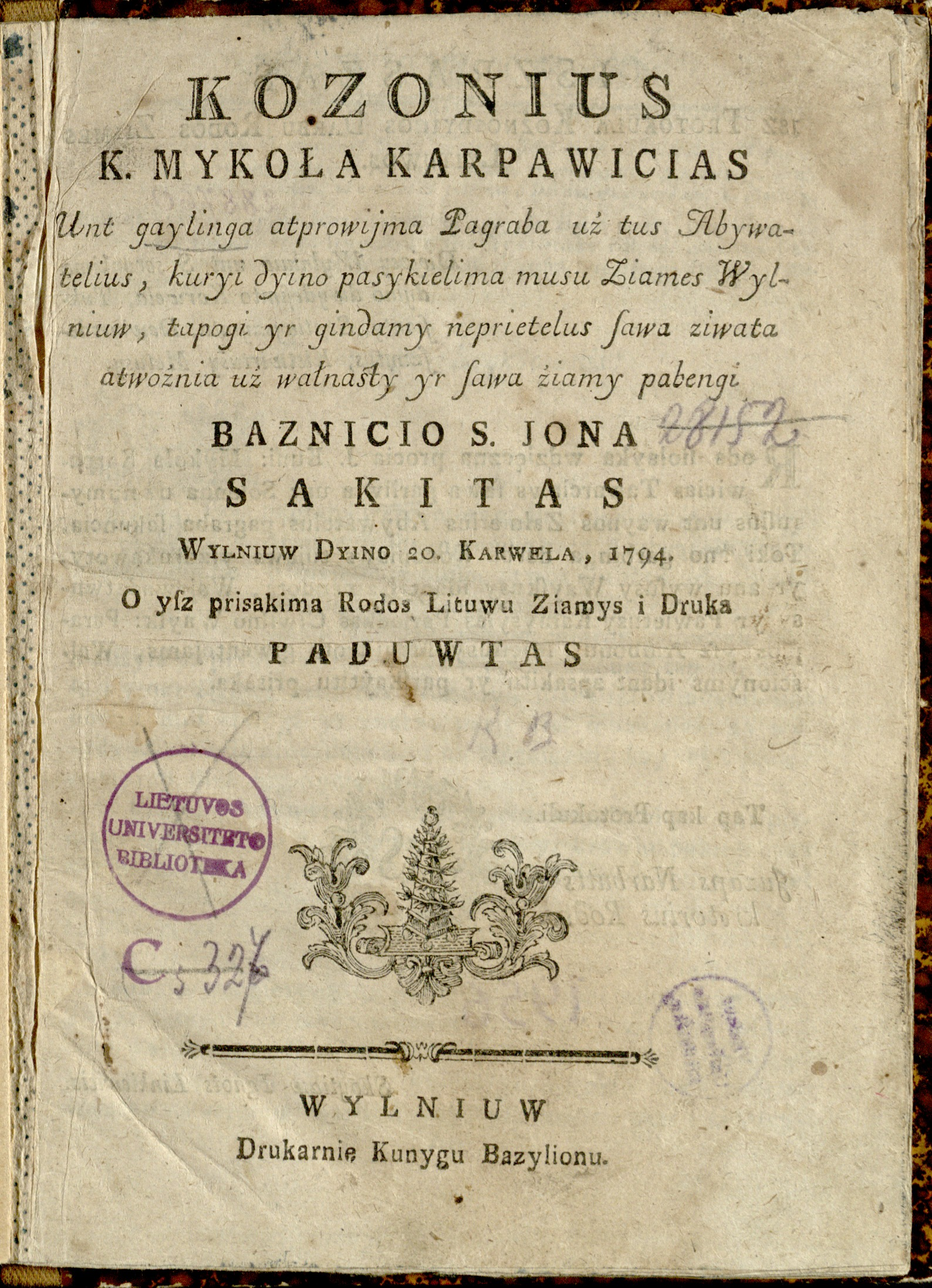
Sermon in Lithuanian language, dedicated to the 1794 Vilnius Uprising, which was delivered in the Church of St. Johns in Vilnius in 1794

Between 1743 and 1754, the artist Jonas Salmanas adorned the church's vaults and walls with monumental frescoes, creating a cohesive Baroque theatrum sacrum (sacred theater) effect that complemented the altar ensemble designed by Glaubitz. The church's reconstruction and decoration in 1756–1758 were overseen by the renowned Lithuanian Jesuit astronomer and architect Thomas Zebrowski, whose intellectual influence helped finalize the layout of the sanctuary's spaces. The church was decorated by brothers Jonas Hėdelis and Juozas Hėdelis; Jesuit sculptors M. Schick, J. Grym, and J. Kierner; painters J. Sahlman and F. Obst; and the carpenter I. Bartsch. Following the 1773 reforms by the Commission of National Education and the suppression of the Jesuit Order, the church officially became the property of the Vilnius University, firmly establishing its role as an academic and ceremonial space within the Vilnius Old Town.

The Church of St. Johns was used by the Lithuanian insurgents during the Vilnius Uprising of 1794 and Bishop of Wigry, Vilnius University professor Michał Franciszek Karpowicz delivered in the Lithuanian language a sermon devoted to the uprising there.

Interior of the Church of St. Johns in the mid-19th century

In 1827–1828, Polish–Lithuanian architect Karol Podczaszyński replaced the Gothic portal of the southern façade with a Classicist one. At that time, the high masonry wall separating the church and the bell tower from the street was demolished. During these renovations, the Baroque interior was altered, many frescoes were plastered over, and the altars situated by the columns were removed. Nearly 3,000 carts with splinters of altars, sculptures and stucco works were taken to a dump. Chapels suffered the least from Podczaszyński's renovations. In 1835, the Vilnian Saint Raphael Kalinowski was baptized in the church. In 1842, St. Johns Church again became a parish church. Following the closure of certain Vilnius churches by order of the Tsarist authorities, some of their paintings, sculptures, and other furnishings were transferred to St. Johns Church. Notably, in 1864, the altar of St. Victor was moved from the Church of the Assumption of the Blessed Virgin Mary to the Chapel of St. Anne within St. Johns Church. The composer Stanisław Moniuszko served as the organist at the church from 1840 to 1842. Repairs to the church were carried out in 1888–1889, and the bell tower underwent repairs in 1903. In the 19th century the church was visited by Simonas Daukantas, Adam Mickiewicz, Juliusz Słowacki. During most of the 19th century the church services in the church were held in Polish language. In 1913, it was also permitted to hold church services in the church in the Lithuanian language, however during the Lithuanian church services Polish nationalists performed attacks (such attacks were condemned by parson T. Makarewicz).

Church of St. Johns and its bell tower within the Vilnius Old Town skyline in 1918

During the World War I the church again suffered damage as three bells were removed from the church and taken further to the Russian Empire in 1915. In 1917, Imperial German Army soldiers looted the metal parts of the church's organ. Between 1940 and 1942, the church became renowned among Lithuanians for the patriotic sermons of Lithuanian priest Alfonsas Lipniūnas, however in 1943 the Nazis deported him to the Stutthof concentration camp.

The Church of St. Johns was closed in the summer of 1948. In 1949, over 5,000 books found in the church were transferred to the Books Palace, while its furnishings and art treasures were distributed among various organizations and the editorial office of the Soviet propaganda daily newspaper Tiesa. Some pieces of the church's furniture and paintings ended up in the Museum of History and Ethnography. A portion of the church's furnishings and other valuables was stolen; the organ was damaged, and the altars were defaced. A paper warehouse of the editorial office of the daily newspaper Tiesa was set up inside the church. Nevertheless, some of the church's valuables (e.g. sculptures) were moved to the church's basements and preserved there, which allowed their later restorations. In 1965, the church was officially transferred to the Vilnius University. Between 1964 and 1979 the church underwent restoration based on a design by Romanas Jaloveckas, during which the chapels and altars were refurbished, and wall painting compositions were uncovered in the central nave, the Chapel of St. Stanislaus Kostka, other chapels, and the Old Sacristy. In 1979, a Museum of Science with a dedicated exposition was established within the church and it was again opened to the public for visits.

Church of St. Johns and its bell tower within the Vilnius Old Town skyline in 2023

In 1989, the frescoes in the Chapels of St. Anne and Mary, Mother of Consolation, were restored in 1989. In 1990, the church was returned to the faithful, and the parish was re-established. The church was consecrated on 11 October 1991. Priests from the Jesuit Order also returned to the church. On his visit to Lithuania in 1993, Pope John Paul II held a meeting with intellectuals in the church. The installation and consecration of the grand organ were completed in 2000. After the church was returned to the faithful, its first prefect was Jonas Algimantas Boruta, who subsequently became Bishop of Samogitia. Boruta was soon succeeded by priest Eitvydas Merkys, followed by Antanas Saulaitis, and subsequently by Leo Leise, Algis Baniulis, and Stasys Kazėnas. Since 2014, the church prefect and Vilnius University chaplain has been Vidmantas Šimkūnas. Almost since the church's reconsecration, the priests have been assisted in their pastoral work by the Sisters of the Eucharist and the long-serving sacristan Saulius Slankauskas. In the bell tower of the church a foucault pendulum was installed, proving that the Earth rotates on its axis.

In 2023, during the 2023 Vilnius NATO summit the American President Joe Biden delivered a twenty-minutes speech to the Lithuanians in front of the Church of St. Johns in the Grand Courtyard of Vilnius University.

The church is used as a venue for the Vilnius University diploma awarding ceremonies upon students graduation and for concerts. After the restoration of its status as church and resumption of its usage for religious purposes in the late 20th century, the church services in the Church of St. Johns are held only in Lithuanian language.

== Architecture ==
=== Exterior ===
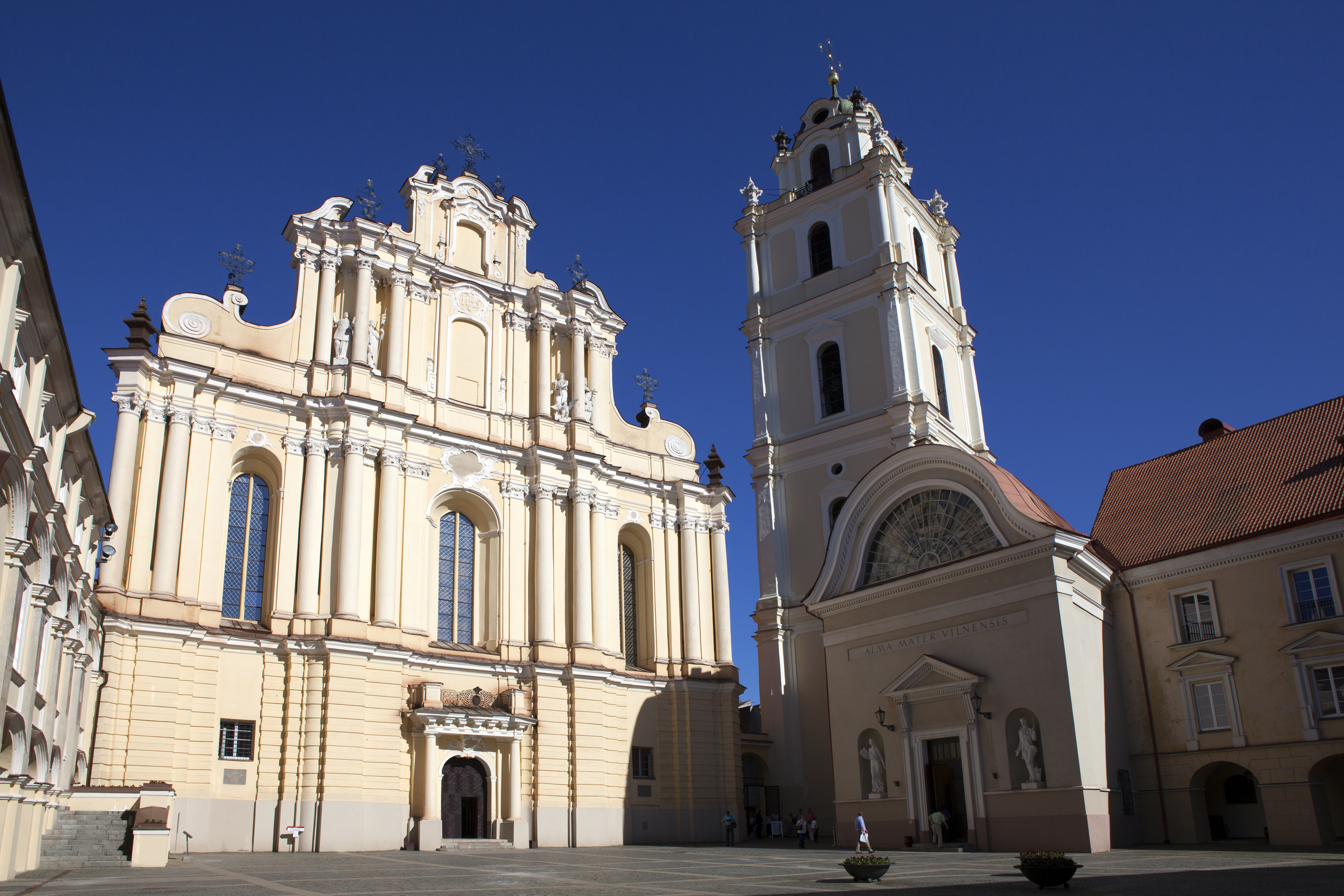
The main façade of the church and its bell tower, viewed from the Grand Courtyard of Vilnius University

The presbytery and the southern side façade of the church facing Pilies Street with surviving Gothic style windows, viewed from the direction of St. John's Street

The layout of the Church of St. Johns still reflects its original Gothic structure. It is a 28-by-69-metre (92 ft × 226 ft) hall church with three naves and seven asymmetrical chapels.

Following the devastating fire of Vilnius of 1737, the reconstruction of the Church of St. Johns was led by architect Johann Christoph Glaubitz, who designed a main façade characterized by fluid, undulating forms – a design that became the benchmark of the Vilnian Baroque.

The church's architectural composition is distinguished by a complex yet harmonious structure: it is a rectangular, three-nave hall church terminating in a presbytery with a three-sided apse. The main volume is complemented by functional and aesthetic details: spacious vestibules are situated on the western and southern sides, and the southern façade is adorned with an ornate portal, beside which rises an authentic stair tower. Six masterfully integrated chapels, along with various ancillary spaces and the sacristy, frame the perimeter of the sanctuary, lending the building a sense of volumetric unity. This entire architectural ensemble also has cellars of varying sizes and heights located beneath the church foundations, forming an extensive underground network.

The four-tiered main façade of St. Johns Church, facing the Grand Courtyard of Vilnius University, is characterized by a rhythmic sequence of arcades and pilasters that masterfully unites the soaring volume of the sanctuary with the lower galleries into a cohesive architectural ensemble. The artistic program conceived by architect Johann Christoph Glaubitz serves as a visual sermon: the third tier features four expressive stucco sculptures arranged in niches between the columns. The outer niches house the founders of the Jesuit Order – saints Ignatius of Loyola and Francis Xavier, while the inner pair depicts the church's patron saints – John the Baptist and John the Evangelist. At the center of this tier stands the emblem of the Society of Jesus – the Christogram IHS. Although the main façade of the church is a masterpiece of Late Baroque architecture, three surviving tall, narrow windows demonstrate its Gothic origins. Commemorative plaques set into the lower section of the church honor prominent Jesuit thinkers: Piotr Skarga (the first rector of the Vilnius Academy, now Vilnius University) and Jakub Wujek.

Figure of the crucified Jesus and Epitaph of the Chreptavičiai family on the church's outer wall facing Pilies Street in 1914

On the southern side of the church, facing St. John's Street, there is a monumental Neoclassical-style entrance featuring a portico supported by rows of Corinthian columns. This later addition creates a stylistic contrast with the ornate Baroque façade. An elaborate masonry gateway connects the church to the bell tower, consisting of five gradually decreasing portions, which stands slightly apart and is the tallest structure in the Vilnius Old Town skyline (69 metres (226 ft), thereby completing the unified composition of the religious complex.

On the eastern side of the church, facing Pilies Street, a large Christian cross bearing figure of the crucified Jesus hangs on the wall of the presbytery. During the Soviet occupation of Lithuania period the authentic figure of the crucified Jesus was stripped off from the church's outer wall under the direction of an influential communist Genrikas Zimanas and its further fate is unknown, however the sculpture was later restored. Beneath it, a memorial plaque – an epitaph for the Chreptavičiai family – was installed in 1759, funded by Jonas Liutauras Chreptavičius. It records that three women of the family (Ona Krišpinienė-Chreptavičienė, Ona Chreptavičienė, Marija Chreptavičienė) rest in the Chapel of Our Lady of Loreto, located on the other side of the wall. The plaque, crafted from limestone, iron, and copper, is framed in the Late Baroque style and decorated with cartouche-like ornamentation and the family coat of arms. Above the epitaph, there is a decorative small balcony featuring an openwork metal railing and a canopy. The eastern façade near the top is also adorned with two sitting black angels (darkened due to the passage of time).

The eastern side wall of the church also preserves a unique 18th-century fresco, currently painted over, depicting death and the horrors of the plague epidemic. The work was created as a votive offering in gratitude for deliverance from the Great Northern War plague outbreak, which in 1710 claimed the lives of the majority of Vilnius's inhabitants. This fragment of monumental painting serves as a rare and historically invaluable testament to the calamities of that era in Vilnius.

The Church of St. Johns is covered by an exceptionally high, steep roof that retains its Gothic proportions. During the building's restoration, the roofing was recreated using authentic dark slate tiles.

Traces of different eras are clearly visible in the church's exterior: beneath the Neoclassical southern portico, designed in 1827 by architect Karol Podczaszyński, an authentic Gothic side portal has been preserved. This element marks one of the sanctuary's oldest entrances and bears witness to the building's origins, which date back to the 15th century. The structure's Gothic nature is further confirmed on the side façades by massive buttresses reinforcing the masonry and by tall, pointed-arch windows that have survived despite later Baroque reconstructions of the church.

=== Interior ===
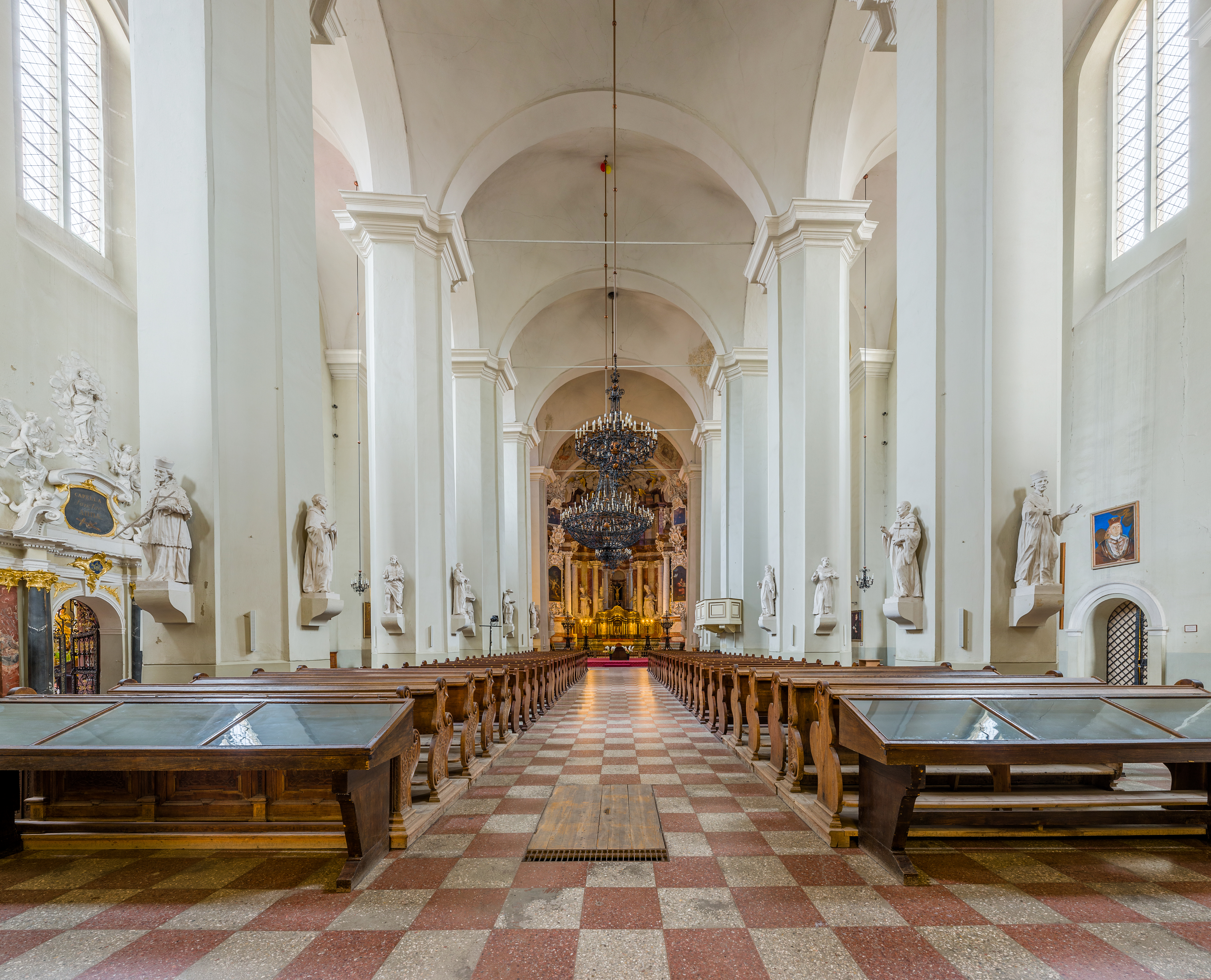
Central nave, viewing to the High Altar

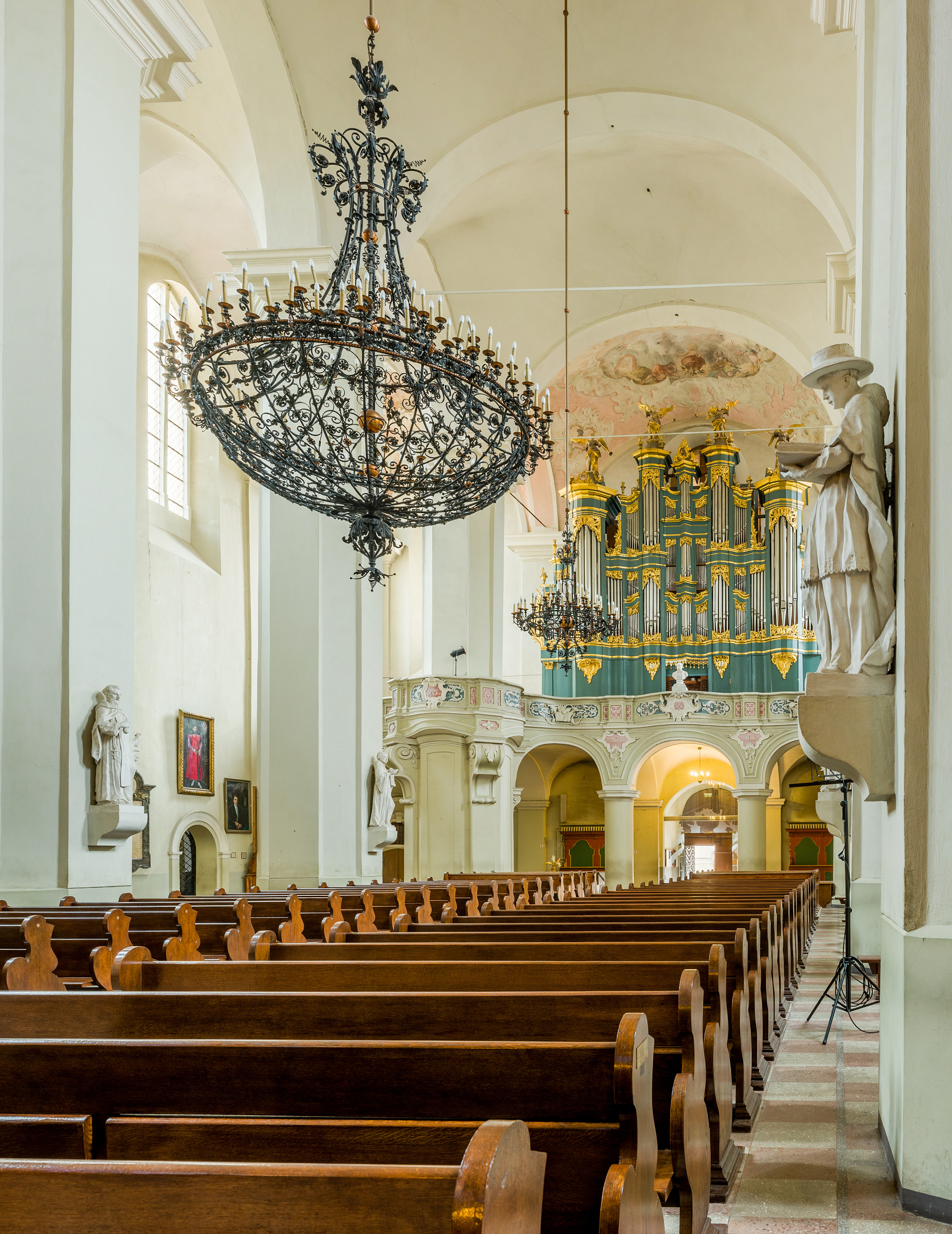
Central nave, viewing to the organ

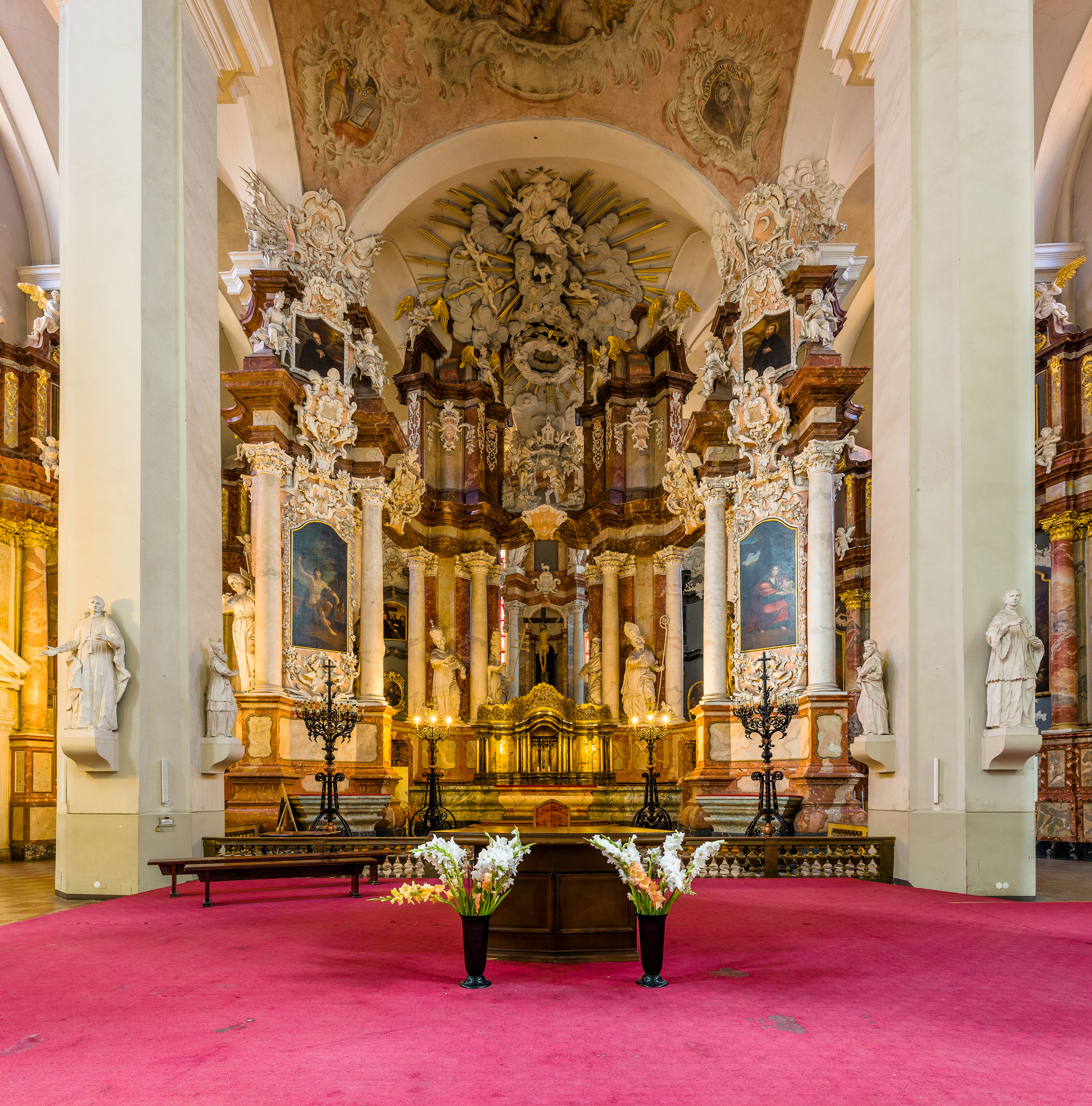
The High Altar of the church

The High Altar ensemble of the church. The photograph shows the tiered structure of the altars, which creates a theatrum sacrum (sacred theater) effect.

Decorative confessional in the church

The Church of St. Johns features a Gothic structure and Baroque forms; it is a hall church with stellar and rib vaults. It consists of three naves (a central one and two side aisles) separated by massive piers. The central nave is significantly higher than the side aisles – a characteristic feature of Late Baroque architecture intended to create an interplay of space and light.

The current interior appearance of the St. Johns Church took its final form after the fire of 1737, when the architect Johann Christoph Glaubitz led the Baroque reconstruction efforts. A key feature of the interior is a unique ensemble of ten altars – unparalleled in Lithuania – designed as a unified Late Baroque scenographic composition. The High Altar serves as the ensemble's central axis, it is distinguished by a complex, dynamic structure of ten freestanding columns, with a gilded tabernacle taking pride of place at its center. This composition follows a strict visual axis: the High Altar aligns with the Altar of Our Lady of Loreto at the far end of the church, creating a deep sense of perspective. The High Altar is organically linked to the side altars of St. Ignatius of Loyola and St. Francis Xavier, together forming a three-altar group within the presbytery. The entire altars ensemble is notable not only for its architectural complexity but also for its rich sculptural decoration and the creation of illusory space – typical characteristics of the Vilnian Baroque.

In the mid-18th century, during the church's Baroque reconstruction led by architect Glaubitz a monumental vaults painting program was created, featuring figural frescos compositions that depicted scenes from the lives of saints John the Baptist and John the Evangelist. These frescos were painted over during a 19th-century reconstruction of the church led by architect Karol Podczaszyński. In the 20th century, Vladas Drėma studied the artwork of the vaults, and several frescos scenes above the organ and in the presbytery were uncovered. Following polychrome studies conducted in early 2026, during which a team of restorers examined 17 vaults and performed 352 test probes across an area exceeding 2,300 square meters, it was discovered that the authentic 18th-century frescos had survived on all the examined vaults. According to the Rector of Vilnius University Rimvydas Petrauskas, it is planned to continue the church's vaults frescos restoration works and uncover the entire vaults painting, a process that could take approximately 10-12 years.

A monumental cross featuring the figure of the Crucified Jesus dominates the center of the High Altar, while a rich iconographic program enhances the entire composition. Four statues of saints named John are arranged in the lower tier: John the Merciful (the former Patriarch of Alexandria), Pope John I, John of Nepomuk, and John the Wonderworker (the former bishop of the Russian Orthodox Church Outside of Russia). The second tier incorporates the sculptural group The Baptism of Jesus, depicting a pivotal biblical event. The altar is crowned by a relief Glory – a composition illuminated by rays, featuring high-relief figures of God the Father, the Holy Spirit (depicted as a dove), and cherubs. This sculptural program, executed in stucco with great plasticity, lends dynamism to the altar and underscores its significance as the church's primary sacred focal point.

The side altars of the presbytery, organically integrated with the High Altar, are distinguished by a complex iconographic program and rich ornamentation. The Altar of St. Ignatius of Loyola (on the southern side) features two paintings, four sculptures, a relief composition, and a sarcophagus-reliquary. The painting St. John the Baptist hangs in the first tier, complemented by sculptures of Jesuit saints: John of Gothia and John Cantius. The painting St. Ignatius of Loyola (or St. Francis Xavier) is set into the second tier, framed by sculptures representing India and Africa – personifications of the exotic lands where Jesuit missions took place. The Altar of St. Francis Xavier (in the northern section) follows a similar structure, adorned with two paintings, three sculptures, and a sarcophagus-reliquary. The painting St. John the Evangelist and a sculpture of St. Francis Xavier himself are positioned in the centre of the first tier. The second tier displays the painting St. Francis Xavier (also known as The Monk in Ecstasy), flanked by sculptures of Arabia and China, which symbolize the geography of Jesuit missions.

The other altars in the church are arranged so that, when viewed from the main entrance, they create a stepped perspective leading into the depth of the church. Located in the side aisles – starting from the left and moving clockwise – are the altars of Saint Joseph, Saint Casimir, the Crucified Jesus, and Our Lady of Loreto. Lined up on the right side (viewed from the High Altar) are the altars of Our Lady of Sorrows, Saint Michael the Archangel, and the Holy Apostles Peter and Paul.

The St. Joseph Altar features the paintings Saints Peter and Paul and, positioned above it, St. Teresa of Ávila; the composition is complemented by four angels sculptures and a relief composition. The St. Casimir Altar shares a similar structure: the painting St. John of Nepomuk is set in the first tier, while painting St. Jude Thaddaeus occupies the second; four angel figures are also present here. The Altar of the Crucified Jesus displays the painting St. Andrew Bobola and sculptures of unidentified saints in its first tier, with the work Three Jesuit Martyrs in the second. One of the most ornate in the ensemble is the Altar of Our Lady of Loreto, which features seven sculptures: the figures of Our Lady of Loreto, John the Evangelist, and Luke the Evangelist stand in the lower tier, while sculptures of Matthew the Apostle and Mark the Evangelist are in the upper tier. This altar is crowned by a relief cartouche featuring a small Agnus Dei sculpture and a relief composition depicting the Holy House of Loreto.

In the central nave near pillars stands an ensemble of 18 sculptures, created in the mid-18th century (c. 1748–1751). The Austrian sculptor Johann Hedel is considered the principal creator of these Late Baroque sculptures. Although the architect Karol Podczaszyński removed some Baroque interior details in the first half of the 19th century in pursuit of Neoclassical architecture purity, this monumental cycle of 18 sculptures was preserved. A significant number of the sculptures depict saints named John who distinguished themselves in the history of Christianity. In addition to Saint John the Baptist and Saint John the Evangelist, the church features saints John of Damascus and John Chrysostom, as well as the monastic saints John Gualbert, John of Sahagún, and John of Choziba, the patriarch saint John the Merciful, and the uncanonized John Sarkander. Furthermore, the Church of St. Johns featured (or was intended to feature) the following saints: the Franciscan Bonaventure, the Evangelist John Mark, the Jesuit John Raulin, John of Dukla, the hermit John Climacus, the Carmelite John of the Cross, John of God (the founder of the Brothers Hospitallers of Saint John of God), John of Matha (the founder of the Trinitarian Order), and the Bernardine John of Capistrano. The remaining figures depict other prominent religious figures, whose selection symbolizes the unity of science and faith – an idea of great significance to the Vilnius University's intellectual and spiritual life.

In the vestibule of the southern entrance stands a sculpture of St. Ignatius of Loyola (artist unknown), created in the second half of the 18th century. This work is a masterful copy of a composition by the Italian sculptor Giuseppe Rusconi located in St. Peter's Basilica in the Vatican City. The presence of this St. Ignatius of Loyola's sculpture here underscores the strong historical ties between the Vilnius Jesuit community and Rome, while also testifying to the high level of craftsmanship in copying during the Baroque era and the desire to replicate the Christendom's most significant artistic masterpieces within Vilnius's sanctuaries.

The church's vaults are a legacy of the Late Gothic period, featuring intricate net and star vaulting that has successfully survived numerous fires and reconstructions. These structures are adorned with a mid-18th-century fresco cycle characterized by dynamic compositions and rich religious symbolism. The principal frescoes depict scenes from the lives of the titular saints: St. John the Baptist and St. John the Evangelist, as well as the celestial hierarchy. This monumental painting creates the "open sky" illusion typical of the Baroque era, visually expanding the church's space and uniting architectural forms with the spiritual narrative. The fresco cycle organically complements the Late Baroque interior ensemble created by the architect Johann Christoph Glaubitz.

The church's windows are tall and gracefully proportioned. Their shape and placement were designed so that the natural light streaming inside would accentuate the sculptural forms of the altar and the stucco moldings. The church houses confessionals and pews dating back to the 18th century. The windows of the presbytery and side aisles are adorned with nine colorful stained-glass windows created during 20th-century restorations and most of them feature predominantly floral motifs and incorporate images of saints. The current church's floor is paved with dark and light stone (marble and granite) tiles arranged in a geometric pattern characteristic of the Late Baroque and Classicist eras. Beneath the floor lie extensive underground chambers and crypts where prominent citizens, Vilnius University professors, and church benefactors were buried for centuries. Old tombstones that were originally part of the flooring were moved to the walls or into chapels during the 19th-century renovations in order to create a more uniform interior space.

Over the centuries, the interior of St. Johns Church has evolved into pantheon for Vilnius University, featuring numerous memorials to distinguished figures in science and culture. Artistic epitaphs and busts installed in the church's central nave and chapels bear witness to the sanctuary's close ties with the academic community. In 1827, a memorial monument to Hieronim Stroynowski, the former Rector of Vilnius University and Bishop of Vilnius, was installed in the northern nave, based on a design by architect Karol Podczaszyński. The upper section of this Neoclassical monument features a bust of the Stroynowski created by the Polish–Lithuanian sculptor Kazimierz Jelski, while the composition is complemented by the coat of arms of the Stroynowski family and an inscribed memorial plaque. The memorial monument of Hieronim Stroynowski was funded by donations, and the monument, noted for its excellent proportions, was ceremoniously unveiled on December 30, 1829.

Monuments of Hieronim Stroynowski (on the left, 1827) and Adam Mickiewicz (on the right, 1899)

In the memorial space of St. Johns Church, special prominence is also given to the poet Adam Mickiewicz, an alumnus of Vilnius University. In 1899, to mark the centenary of the Mickiewicz's birth, a monumental memorial was installed in the church's southern nave, which consists of a bronze bust of Mickiewicz created by sculptor Marceli Marek Guyski and an encompassing plaster composition. The monument was designed by architect Jonas Vasiliauskas and features elements of the Historicist style. At monument's base are incorporated attributes symbolizing the Mickiewicz's work – a lyre and a laurel wreath. This memorial became a significant cultural focal point, around which a veritable pantheon of notable figures subsequently took shape. Commemorative plaques and bas-reliefs installed near the Mickiewicz's bust recall his connection to the Philomaths and Philarets movements in the Vilnius University and the ideals of freedom Mickiewicz cherished during his studies at Vilnius University. For a long time, the Mickiewicz's monument in the church served not only as an artistic feature but also as a symbol of quiet resistance and national identity.

The entrance to the Old Sacristy of the church, located in the northern part of the nave, right next to the presbytery. The walls are covered with luxurious brownish polychrome stucco, resembling marble.

In the southern nave of the church, alongside other prominent figures, Simonas Daukantas, a Vilnius University alumnus and the first Lithuanian historian to write in the Lithuanian language, is honored. In 1924, a memorial monument dedicated to Daukantas was unveiled here, which consists of a bronze bust created by the Lithuanian sculptor Juozas Zikaras, set within a Neoclassical-style aedicula. This monument symbolically embodies Daukantas's contribution to the Lithuanian historiography and the Lithuanian National Revival, while highlighting his years of study at Vilnius University. The church's memorial space also features a monument to the Lithuanian Jesuit professor Konstantinas Sirvydas, a pioneer of Lithuanian writing. In 1989, to mark the Vilnius University's anniversary, a monument created by Lithuanian sculptor Juozas Kėdainis was installed in the northern nave of the church. The monument of Sirvydas depicts the contemplative scholar holding his major work – the first dictionary of the Lithuanian language in his hands. This feature serves as a reminder of the spiritual and Lithuanian cultural legacy of Sirvydas, one of the most distinguished preachers and lecturers of the Vilnius University.

One of the church's two old benches bearing the Jesuit Christogram IHS, this one stand near the entrance to the Old Sacristy

In addition to the historic figures already mentioned, the church interior also commemorates other prominent Lithuanian and Polish cultural and scientific figures, creating a cohesive space of historical memory. Memorials to the poet Władysław Syrokomla and the composer Stanisław Moniuszko are mounted on the pillars and walls, the latter's bust (sculpted by the Lithuanian sculptor Boleslovas Balzukevičius) symbolically adorns the base of the organ loft, serving as a reminder that the composer served as the church's organist for a decade. A plaque embedded in the northern nave honors Jakub Jasiński, a leader of the 1794 Vilnius Uprising and a defender of Lithuania's capital city Vilnius. Of particular artistic merit is the Late Renaissance and Mannerist styles funerary monument to the noble Ogiński family, located in the chapel bearing their name. It is one of the oldest and most masterful monuments of its kind in Lithuania, distinguished by its complex sculptural composition and the Ogiński family's heraldry. Nearby stands a monument, featuring Late Baroque characteristics, dedicated to Ignacy Jakub Massalski, the former Bishop of Vilnius and Chairman of the Commission of National Education, which embodies the ideals of the Age of Enlightenment and the Massalski's contribution to educational reform in the Polish–Lithuanian Commonwealth.

The pantheon of St. Johns Church is complemented by an extensive gallery of portraits and memorial plaques dedicated to figures who shaped the intellectual character of Vilnius. Portraits of proponent of the Lithuanian National Revival Jonas Basanavičius, astronomer Marcin Odlanicki Poczobutt, Samogitian Bishop Motiejus Valančius, Polish–Lithuanian monarch Stephen Báthory, historian Teodor Narbutt, medical professors Jędrzej Śniadecki and Juozapas Adomas Valavičius, the Jesuit poet Maciej Kazimierz Sarbiewski, jurist and astronomer Jan Śniadecki, and other prominent individuals adorn the church's walls and pillars. Monuments to the Vilnius University curators and patrons further enrich the memorial ensemble. A place of distinction among them is held by the memorial plaque to Adam Jerzy Czartoryski, a curator of the Vilnius Educational District under whose leadership the Vilnius University experienced its golden age. The interior also features epitaphs and commemorative markers dedicated to the writer Antoni Edward Odyniec, as well as the 1794 Kościuszko Uprising leader Tadeusz Kościuszko, and other figures who represented the cultural and political thought of the 19th-century Vilnius.

A part of the church's Baroque furniture from the 18th century was preserved, which was possibly manufactured by the Jesuit craftsmen themselves. Fine examples of such historic furniture are two benches adorned in intarsia style with different types of woods and bearing the Jesuit Christogram IHS.

Church's organ, the largest in Lithuania

Historical sources attest that the organ within these vaults resounded during all the major ceremonies of Vilnius University. As a result of a complex historical evolution, the organ in the church have been replaced or rebuilt at least six times. In 1948, the church's organ was severely damaged by the Soviet government, which closed down the church. In the late 20th century (1983–2000), the organ of the church underwent a major restoration and expansion by the German company Alexander Schuke Potsdam Orgelbau and Lithuanian company Vilnius Organ Workshop (UAB Vilniaus vargonų dirbtuvė) during which the historical façade of the organ was preserved, but a modern mechanical action was installed. The current church's organ installed above the main entrance of the church comprises 3,625 (or, according to other sources, 3,925) wooden and metal pipes arranged in three tiers within an ornate Baroque case. The organ's specification was reconstructed based on the historical traditions of Adam Gottlob Casparini and the later work of Juozapas Radavičius. Although the church's organ is best suited for performing the music of German composers from the 18th and the first half of the 19th centuries, its versatile specification also allows for the successful interpretation of works by composers from other eras and countries, particularly French composers. It is the largest organ in Lithuania, featuring 64 stops, three manuals, and a pedal keyboard.

Along the perimeter of the church a number of chapels are situated, however their number in cited sources varies due to differing functional assessments of the spaces. The church's official website identifies six main chapels. The chapels are arranged asymmetrically around the main building: viewed from the organ side, the left nave contains the Chapel of St. Anne (formerly St. Michael's), the Ogiński Chapel (formerly the Chapel of the Corpus Christi Congregation), the Chapel of Mary, Comforter of the Afflicted, and the Chapel of Good Hope (formerly the Chapel of the Immaculate Conception), which currently houses the sacristy, while the right nave contains the Chapel of St. Barbara and the Chapel of Saints Cosmas and Damian (also known as the Piasecki Chapel).

==== Old Sacristy ====
The Old Sacristy of the church

A spacious and ornate sacristy is situated in the northern nave of the church, behind the Ogiński Chapel. It was created in 1761 through the complete reconstruction of the residential buildings that had previously stood on the site. During the renovation, the room's ceiling was raised, and Late Baroque-style vaults were constructed – features that have survived to the present day.

Set into the centre of the vault is a ceiling painting with a complex outline, depicting a narrative scene: the offering made in the temple by Zechariah – the High Priest of the Jews and father of John the Baptist. This monumental fresco is believed to have been painted in the second half of the 18th century and organically complements the sanctuary's overall artistic program dedicated to the church's patron saints.

The Vilnius University Museum exhibition Science and Life at the Jesuit University is currently housed in the church's Old Sacristy. The exhibition is designed to present key themes in the Vilnius University's history, the space, featuring an authentic Late Baroque setting and preserved 18th-century wall paintings, provides a unique context for showcasing academic heritage. Moreover, on display in the Old Sacristy is a decorative panel by the Lithuanian artist Adomas Smetona titled Stephen Báthory Founds Vilnius University. The work was painted by Smetona in 1939 specifically for the Lithuanian pavilion at the 1939 New York World's Fair. It depicts the historical scene in which Stephen Báthory, King of Poland and Grand Duke of Lithuania, presents the charter establishing the university in Vilnius. The painting returned to Lithuania after a long odyssey, as the outbreak of World War II prevented the repatriation of the New York exhibition's artifacts for an extended period of time.

==== Chapel of St. Anne ====
Interior of the St. Anne's Chapel with an authentic mid-18th century Altar of Saint Victor of Marseilles

Small organ of the St. Anne's Chapel

Entrance to the St. Anne's Chapel with an ornate portal

The Chapel of Saint Anne (also referred to in historical sources as the Chapel of St. Michael, the Immaculate Conception of the Blessed Virgin Mary, the Guardian Angels, or the Small Chapel of the Student Congregation) is located in the left nave of the church near the organ and was built at the turn of the 17th-18th centuries. The chapel's interior consists of two lintels of unequal size featuring sail vaults. Its architectural structure is articulated on the southern side by an authentic Gothic buttress, mirrored on the northern wall by a pilaster of equal width.

The chapel is illuminated by five windows on the north wall, balanced on the south side by five painted illusionistic windows and two Baroque style portals.

The western portal adorns the doorway leading into the church interior. Its splays are decorated with five panoplies of stylized plant branches, incorporating the letters "A" and "C" (Angeli Custodes – Guardian Angels), as well as the monograms "PC" and "M". A Baroque cartouche featuring a pear-shaped shield is sculpted onto the pediment, topped by two figures of guardian angels created by the Austrian sculptor Johann Hedel. The eastern portal leads to a small sacristy. This portal, designed in the Corinthian order, is more modest and it is decorated with four panoplies and topped by a Rococo vase flanked by two additional angel sculptures by Johann Hedel. An organ loft, supported by two tapering pillars, is situated against the western wall. A staircase is built into the southern end of the loft, with a bas-relief depiction of King David visible above it. The vaults are adorned with frescoes illustrating the biblical story of Esther and Ahasuerus.

The chapel's greatest artistic treasure is the richly carved wooden altar of Saint Victor of Marseilles, dating from the 17th century and acquired from the Franciscan monastery in 1864, which represents the transitional period between Baroque and Rococo and is interpreted as a complex sculptural theological treatise. Rising at its centre is a symbolic Tree of life – a cross formed from a massive grapevine trunk, complete with lush foliage and clusters of grapes, embodying the mystery of the Eucharist and the transformation of wine into the Blood of Christ. This grapevine grows directly from the sarcophagus of the 3rd-century martyr and Roman officer Saint Victor, whose relics are visible through special openings, while four statues of martyrs stand guard around it: the soldiers Saint George and Saint Florian, as well as the priests Saint Stephen and Saint Lawrence. The altar's composition is crowned by figures of God the Father and the Four Evangelists, symbolizing the apotheosis of Jesus's teaching, along with a silver-plated dove representing the Holy Spirit, positioned beneath the clouds.

The entrance to the chapel from the northern nave is adorned by a portal designed in 1748 by architect Johann Christoph Glaubitz. Its composition is dedicated to the Apotheosis of the Immaculate Conception of the Mother of God. Massive Baroque forms and black columns at the base give way to a light pediment in the upper section, depicting Mary, mother of Jesus, ascending amidst the clouds. She is accompanied by guardian angels bearing the souls of children, while small angels seated on the acroteria at the bottom of the composition symbolically strike down devils.

==== Chapel of Corpus Christi (Ogiński) ====
Altar of the Corpus Christi (Ogiński) Chapel

Small organ of the Corpus Christi (Ogiński) Chapel

Entrance to the Corpus Christi (Ogiński) Chapel with an ornate portal and gilded gates

The Chapel of Corpus Christi (also known as the Chapel of Ogiński) is located in the left nave of the church near the organ and was built in the second half of the 16th century (around 1573), and originally belonged to the Confraternity of Corpus Christi. Following a tragic fire in 1737 that destroyed the entire interior, the chapel was rebuilt by the architect A. Viurcneris, though it was subsequently abandoned. The chapel entered a new phase of its existence thanks to the Ogiński family when Tomasz Ogiński, Voivode of Trakai, took it under his patronage and transformed it into the Ogiński family mausoleum. Currently, the Blessed Sacrament is housed within the chapel.

The reconstruction of the chapel in the mid-18th century was carried out based on the design of the Jesuit architect G. Lekevičius (a student of Thomas Zebrowski). The old masonry walls were demolished down to the foundations, and the new interior acquired a monumental Neoclassical character: the walls were articulated with paired Corinthian order pilasters and the entablature and cornice were emphasized. A niche was created in place of the altar to house the miraculous 16th-century wooden sculpture of the Crucified Jesus, which had been saved from a fire of 1737. Moreover, in the church's basement under the chapel there is a crypt where members of the Ogiński family were buried.

From an artistic standpoint, the most valuable element in the chapel is an 18th-century fresco composition by an unknown painter that conveys the mystery of the Eucharist through three interconnected scenes. The first motif is notable for its realistic depiction of everyday life, showing the Jewish people being fed heavenly manna in the wilderness. In the fresco thirty-one figures are shown catching the manna in various vessels and even sheets, while Moses and the High Priest Aaron, astonished by the miracle, are depicted on the southern wall. In the centre of the vault, the composition continues with a large angel displaying an open book bearing a Latin text from the Gospel of John the Apostle regarding the "true bread from heaven", while the work concludes at the eastern altar end with the Ark of the Covenant surrounded by angels. Above it, emerging from the clouds, is a golden chalice containing a Host – a symbol of the mystery of the Mass and the Divine Incarnation.

In the mid-19th century, Irenėjus Kleopas Oginskis initiated the renovation of the chapel. The semi-ornamental stained glass windows for the chapel were produced by the Parisian company Loran et Gazel, based on a design by Jan Kazimierz Wilczyński and cartoons by J. V. Puzinas. They featured the most renowned sacred images from the churches of Vilnius and the coats of arms of Ogiński family. Although the stained glass windows were manufactured in 1861, they were not installed in the chapel until 1890 due to prohibitions imposed by the Tsarist administration following the January Uprising. The authentic stained glass windows of the chapel were destroyed during World War II, however in 1980 restorer A. Grabauskas reconstructed their ornamental design by using the remaining fragments of stained glass.

==== Chapel of the Blessed Virgin Mary of Consolation ====
Interior of the Chapel of the Blessed Virgin Mary of Consolation

The Chapel of the Blessed Virgin Mary of Consolation (also known as the Chapel of St. Stanislaus Kostka or the Chapel of the Middle Congregation) is located in the left nave of the church and is the first chapel encountered when moving from the organ. The chapel was built in the first half of the 17th century within the small garden that once occupied the northern churchyard. Its exterior is characterized by the restraint and concise forms typical of early Vilnian Baroque, while a dome topped with a roof lantern rises above the altar. In the 17th-18th centuries this space was directly connected to the central building of Vilnius University.

According to a description from 1774, the chapel walls were decorated with faux marble and black marble, and the dome was adorned with frescoes. Lighting for the chapel is provided by four stained glass windows, mirrored by four corresponding windows on the opposite wall. A focal point of the interior is the altar, featuring a painting of the Blessed Virgin Mary with the Child, which is completed with a metal overlay and a decorative gilded frame.

During the 1969 restoration fragments of portrait paintings were discovered on the chapel's dome vaults and by 1981 almost all the wall paintings covering the upper sections of the walls, the western vaults, the vestibule in the eastern section, the dome, and the roof lantern had been restored.

The artistic renovation of the chapel is linked to the canonization of the Jesuit alumni Stanislaus Kostka and Aloysius Gonzaga, which took place at the Vatican City on June 19, 1726, under the pontificate of Pope Benedict XIII. To mark the occasion, the Chapel of the Blessed Virgin Mary of Consolation was dedicated to St. Stanislaus Kostka and newly decorated with scenes depicting his life, miracles, and apotheosis. Although the artist of the 18th-century frescoes remains unknown, it is believed to have been a young Italian working under the guidance of Jesuit professors.

The painted composition of the dome is divided into two main zones: the earthly realm, featuring participants of the canonization ceremony of St. Stanislaus Kostka, and the heavenly realm. Pope Benedict XIII is depicted in the northern section of the dome, accompanied by a group of eight Jesuits that includes Vladislovas Daukša, at the time of the chapel's renovation the Rector of Vilnius University (1727–31 and 1741–44), clad in a red toga, while hovering above him is a genius of glory holding the sceptre of the Rector of Vilnius University. Moreover, two Polish nobles are depicted on the southwest side, while a delegation of eleven Lithuanian nobles, bearing the two-colored flag of the Grand Duchy of Lithuania and individualized portraits, likely copied from engravings, is lined up in the southern section. A monumental figure of St. Stanislaus Kostka, wearing a black cloak, rises to the full height of the eastern wall, while the adjacent walls depict his baptism and the miraculous saving of the city of Lviv from fire. Finally, the heavenly zone, which is located on the barrel vaults above the western architrave, depicts the St. Stanislaus Kostka's apotheosis in heaven, where he is surrounded by the Holy Trinity, Mary, mother of Jesus, and angels.

==== Chapel of Piasecki ====
Altar of the Chapel of Piasecki

The Chapel of Piasecki is located behind the Chapel of Saint Barbara, to the right of the organ loft. This space was established and previously historically maintained by the Guild of Doctors and Barbers of Vilnius. Consequently, the chapel's main altar composition features images of the patron saints of medical doctors profession – Cosmas and Damian. The first tier of the altar also depicts Saint Casimir and Saint Wenceslaus (or Saint Ladislaus), while Saint Catherine of Alexandria is featured at the very top of the altar.

The chapel's altar is made of wood and is richly decorated with stucco moldings, figures of angels, and relief carvings of angels' heads. The chapel's artistic program is complemented by paintings depicting Saint Hilary of Poitiers, Pope Gregory XIII, and an unidentified pope. This chapel's ensemble reflects the traditions of profession guilds and their contribution to the church's memorial and sacred space.

==== Chapel of St. Barbara ====
The Chapel of Saint Barbara is the first chapel located to the right of the organ loft. It was fitted out and patronized at the expense of the Guild of Goldsmiths of Vilnius, thereby highlighting the contribution of profession guilds to the ornamentation of the church.

The focal point of the chapel is the Late Baroque style Altar of Saint Barbara, distinguished by its sculptural forms and lavish ornamentation. This two-tiered, polychromed, and gilded wooden structure stands out for its undulating plinths and contrasting color scheme: architectural elements are painted in blackish tones and a pink hue imitating marble. The altar's artistic program comprises two paintings, six sculptures, and a relief Gloria. The titular painting Saint Barbara is set within the first tier, flanked by monumental sculptures of the Apostles Saint Peter and Saint Paul. The second tier features the painting Saint Nicholas (also identified as Bishop Giving Alms), while the composition is crowned by a relief Gloria depicting God the Father, surrounded by graceful sculptures of cherubs. This altar's ensemble brings a harmonious conclusion to the chapel's interior, imbuing the space with the solemnity and spiritual dynamism characteristics of the Late Baroque style.

=== Bell tower ===
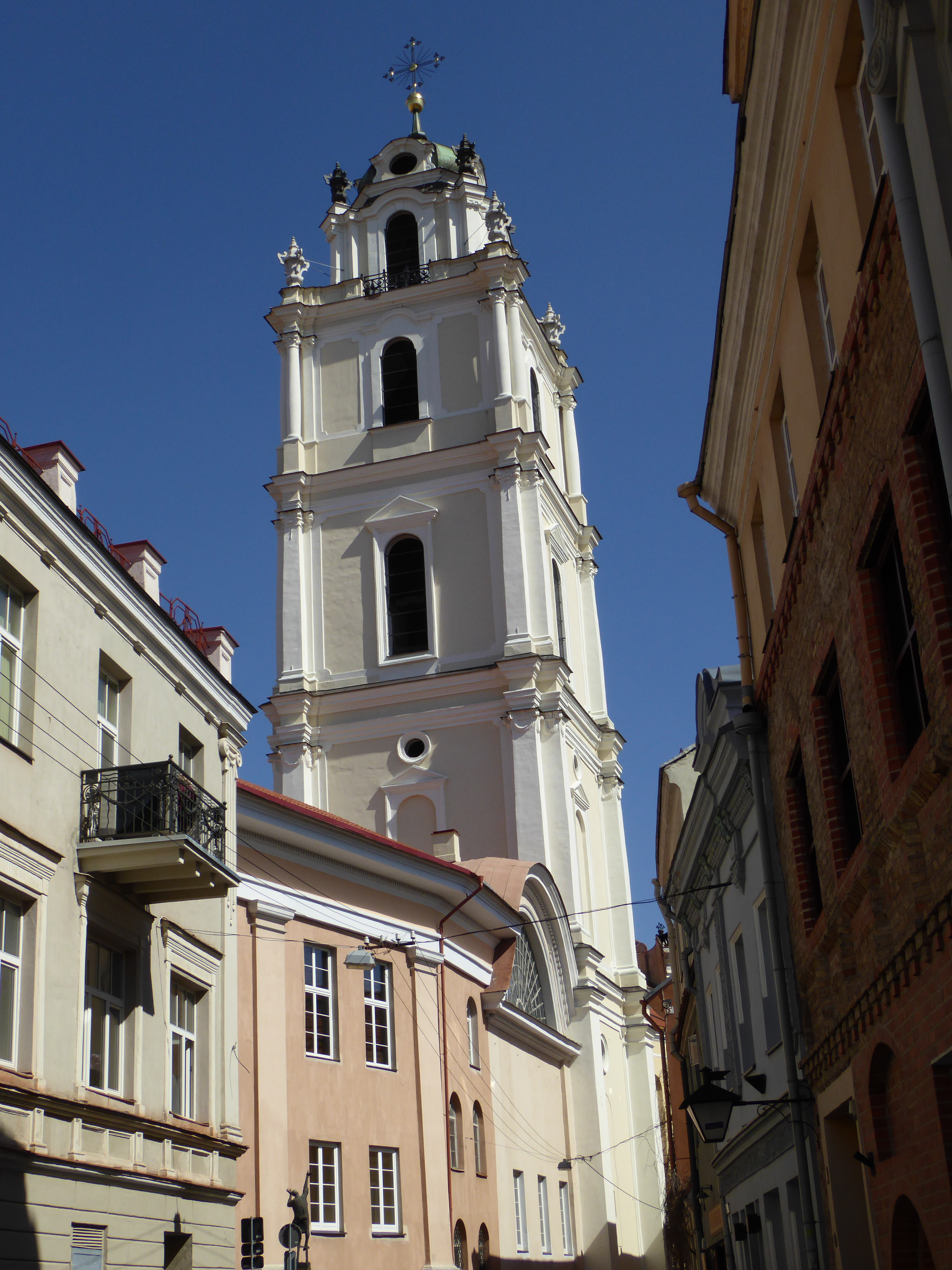
Bell tower of the church, viewed from St. John's Street

Standing next to the church is a bell tower of 69-metre (226 ft), which is the tallest building in the Vilnius Old Town. The bell tower was built, presumably on the former defensive building, separately from the main church building and it is a significant part of the architectural ensemble of Vilnius University. The bell tower features a five-tiered structure. The three massive lower levels retain the restrained composition and clear geometric forms characteristic of Renaissance architecture. The two upper tiers of the bell tower are adorned with more elaborate architectural elements, reflecting the Late Baroque architecture style. The bell tower is crowned by a graceful, helmet-shaped roof with decorative details, lending the entire composition a sense of verticality and lightness. The current appearance of the bell tower match the inventory description of Vilnius University dating to 1774. The bell tower was opened to the public in 2011 and its observation desk is accessible via an elevator or by climbing the authentic wooden 193 steps. Offering a wide panorama of the Vilnius Old Town from its observation deck, the bell tower stands out as one of the most prominent architectural landmarks of Vilnius Old Town.

In the early 21st century the Foucault pendulum was installed inside the bell tower and is one of the attractions within the central ensemble of Vilnius University. It is a scientific instrument designed to demonstrate the Earth's rotation on its axis. Beyond its scientific significance, it serves as an educational tool, allowing visitors to explore principles of physics and astronomical phenomena. The Foucault pendulum also complements the bell tower's role as an observation and educational space. The long suspension cable, combined with the bell tower's great height, makes changes in the oscillation clearly visible. Moreover, the bell tower's Foucault pendulum is the only such device in Baltic states.

== Social and cultural activities ==
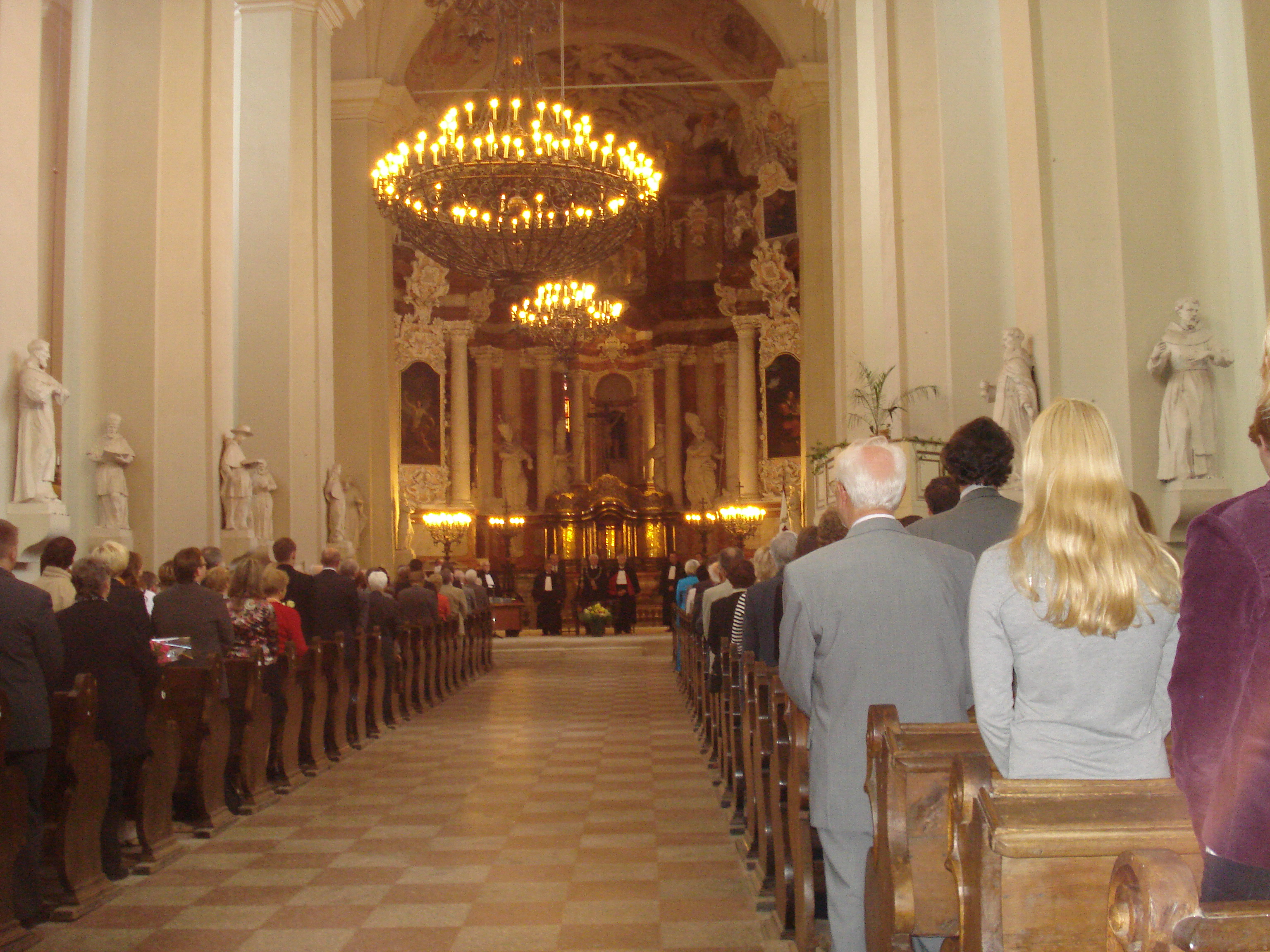
Vilnius University's End of Academic Year Celebration Finis Anni Academici in the church in 2007

Wake ceremony of the state funeral of Adolfas Ramanauskas in the church in 2018

Over the course of several centuries, the Church of St. Johns has become a significant venue for cultural life in Vilnius. Since the 16th century, when the church became linked to Vilnius University, it has hosted not only church services but also various academic and cultural activities. This tradition continues to this day, making the church one of the most important centers of the Vilnius University's cultural life. Historically, the church hosted Vilnius University's ceremonies, services for the academic community, formal commemorations, and religious processions. During the Jesuit era, the church was closely linked to academic education: it was the site of sermons, theological disputations, and ceremonial celebrations marking significant religious and academic events. This practice reflected the Jesuit educational tradition, in which religion, art, and scholarship were viewed as closely interconnected fields.

In the second half of the 20th century, following its restoration, the church began to be used more actively for cultural events. Thanks to its excellent acoustics, it became one of the most important venues in Vilnius for choral and organ) music concerts. Sacred music concerts, festivals, and academic ceremonies are regularly held there. University choirs and musical ensembles perform at the venue, including the Vilnius University Academic Choir Gaudeamus, the Vilnius University Choir Pro Musica, and the Vilnius University Girls' Choir Virgo. In addition to concerts, the church hosts various cultural events, such as lectures, exhibitions, literary evenings, and Vilnius University's celebrations. Such events often coincide with the start or end of the academic year, Vilnius University's anniversaries, and other significant dates.

An important historical event in the life of the church took place on September 5, 1993, when it was visited by Pope John Paul II during his 1993 tour of Lithuania, Latvia, and Estonia. During the visit, the pope met with the local academic community and prayed in the church, highlighting its historical connection to Vilnius University.

The church services in the church are held only in Lithuanian language. The graduation ceremonies of Vilnius University held in the church are mostly conducted in Lithuanian language, however for students (mostly international) who studied English language programs the graduation ceremonies are conducted by providing simultaneous interpretation from Lithuanian to English.

On rare occasions the church is also used for the wake ceremonies of deceased people who have made outstanding contributions to the Lithuanian science, culture, academic community or defense of Lithuania's statehood (e.g. the former Lithuanian partisans leader Adolfas Ramanauskas, the former Lithuanian Prime Minister Kazimira Prunskienė, poet Violeta Palčinskaitė, etc.).

Nowadays, the church remains a vibrant space for the cultural and academic community. It hosts religious services, concerts, and public events that bridge religious tradition with the university's cultural life. For this reason, the church is regarded not only as a significant monument of sacred architecture but also as a vital part of cultural identity of Vilnius.

== See also ==
- List of Jesuit sites
- List of churches in Vilnius
- Catholic Church in Lithuania
