= St John Street =

St John Street may refer to:

- St John Street, Launceston, Australia
- St John Street, London, England
- St John Street, Oxford, England
- St. John Street, Portland, Maine, United States

== See also ==
- St John's Street (disambiguation)
