= St John's Street =

St John's Street may refer to:

- St John's Street, Cambridge, England
- St. John's Street Railway Company. St. John's, Newfoundland
- St. John's Street, Vilnius, Lithuania

== See also ==
- St John Street (disambiguation)
- St John Baptist's Street, former name of Merton Street, Oxford, England
