= Konstantinas Sirvydas =

Lithuanian lexicographer (d. 1631)

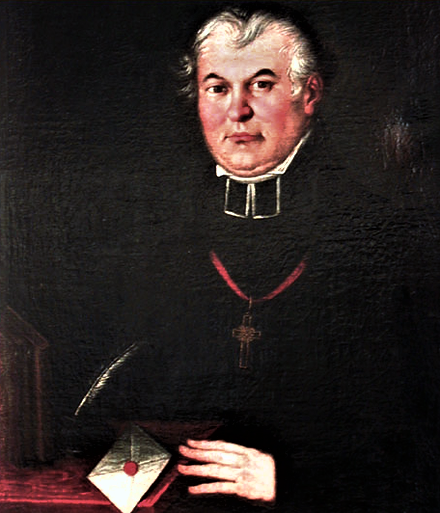
- Born: c. 1579; Sirvydai
- Died: August 23, 1631; Vilnius
- Occupations: Religious preacher, lexicographer, professor
- Notable work: Dictionarium Trium Lingvarum in usum Studiosæ Iuventutis, the first dictionary of the Lithuanian language

Konstantinas Sirvydas (rarely referred as Konstantinas Širvydas; Latin: Constantinus Szyrwid; Polish: Konstanty Szyrwid; c. 1579 – August 23, 1631) was a Lithuanian religious preacher, lexicographer, and one of the pioneers of Lithuanian literature from the Grand Duchy of Lithuania, at the time a confederal part of the Polish-Lithuanian Commonwealth. He was a Jesuit priest, a professor at the Academia Vilnensis, and the author of, among other works, the first grammar of the Lithuanian language and the first trilingual dictionary in Lithuanian, Latin, and Polish (1619). Famous for his eloquence, Sirvydas spent 10 years of his life preaching sermons at St. Johns' Church in Vilnius (twice a day – once in Lithuanian and once in Polish).

== Biography ==
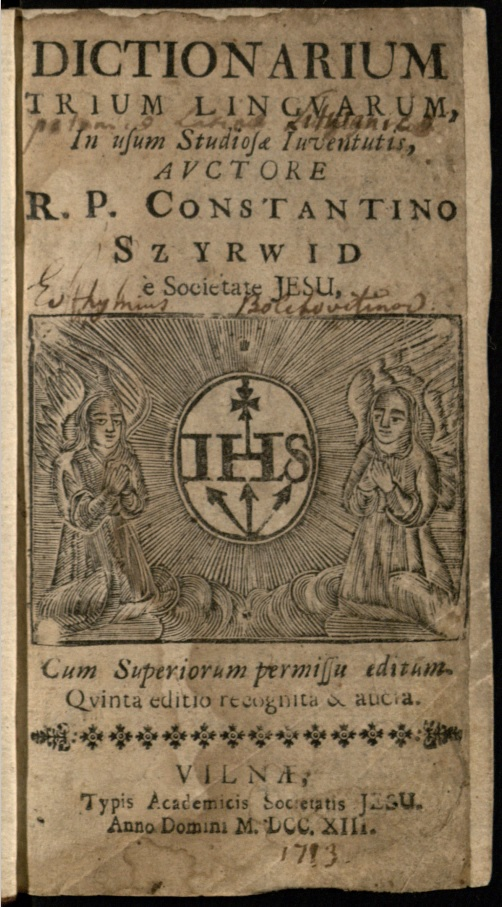
Title page of the last (1713) edition of Dictionarium Trium Lingvarum in usum Studiosæ Iuventutis

He was born in Lithuania some time between 1578 and 1581, in the village of Sirvydai near Anykščiai. In 1612, he became a professor of theology at the Academia Vilnensis, the predecessor of Vilnius University. Between 1623 and 1624 he also briefly served as the deputy rector of his alma mater, after which he continued as a professor in theology, liberal arts, and philosophy.

== Works ==
At the same time, he began his career as a preacher, writer, and scientist. He published his trilingual Polish-Lithuanian-Latin dictionary Dictionarium Trium Lingvarum in usum Studiosæ Iuventutis, one of the first such books in Lithuanian literary history some time before 1620. It was later printed in at least five editions, the fifth and last edition being printed in 1713. Until the 19th century, it was the only Lithuanian dictionary printed in Lithuania. Sirvydas' lexicon is often mentioned as a milestone in the standardisation and codification of the Lithuanian language. The first edition contained approximately 6000 words, the second was expanded to include almost 11,000 words. It also included a lot of newly created Lithuanian words, including for example mokytojas (teacher), taisyklė (rule), and kokybė (quality).

A decade later, in 1629, he published the first volume of a collection of his sermons entitled Punktai sakymų, and later translated them into the Polish language as Punkty kazań. The Lithuanian version of this work was often used as a primer to teach the Lithuanian language. However, it was not until 1644 that the second volume was finally published. Around 1630, he compiled the first book of grammar of the Lithuanian language (Lietuvių kalbos raktas – 'Key to the Lithuanian Language'), which did not, however, survive to our times. He died of tuberculosis on August 23, 1631 in Vilnius.

== Other works ==
- Explanationes in Cantica Canticorum Salomonis et in epistolam D. Pavli ad Ephesios
