= Rimvydas Petrauskas =

Lithuanian historian, academic

- Born: Rimvydas Petrauskas; 21 October 1972 (age 53); Vilnius, Lithuania

Academic background
- Education: Vilnius University

Academic work
- Discipline: History
- Institutions: Vilnius University

Rimvydas Petrauskas (October 21, 1972 in Vilnius) is a Lithuanian historian, and the current Rector of the Vilnius University since 2020. For his outstanding scientific research, he received a variety of awards, including the Knight's Cross of the Order of the Lithuanian Grand Duke Gediminas (in 2018), Knight's Cross of the Order of Merit of the Republic of Poland (in 2019), Lithuanian Science Prize (in 2019).
