= Jerzy Radziwiłł (1556–1600) =

Polish–Lithuanian magnate

His Eminence Jerzy Radziwiłł
- Cardinal, Bishop of Vilnius
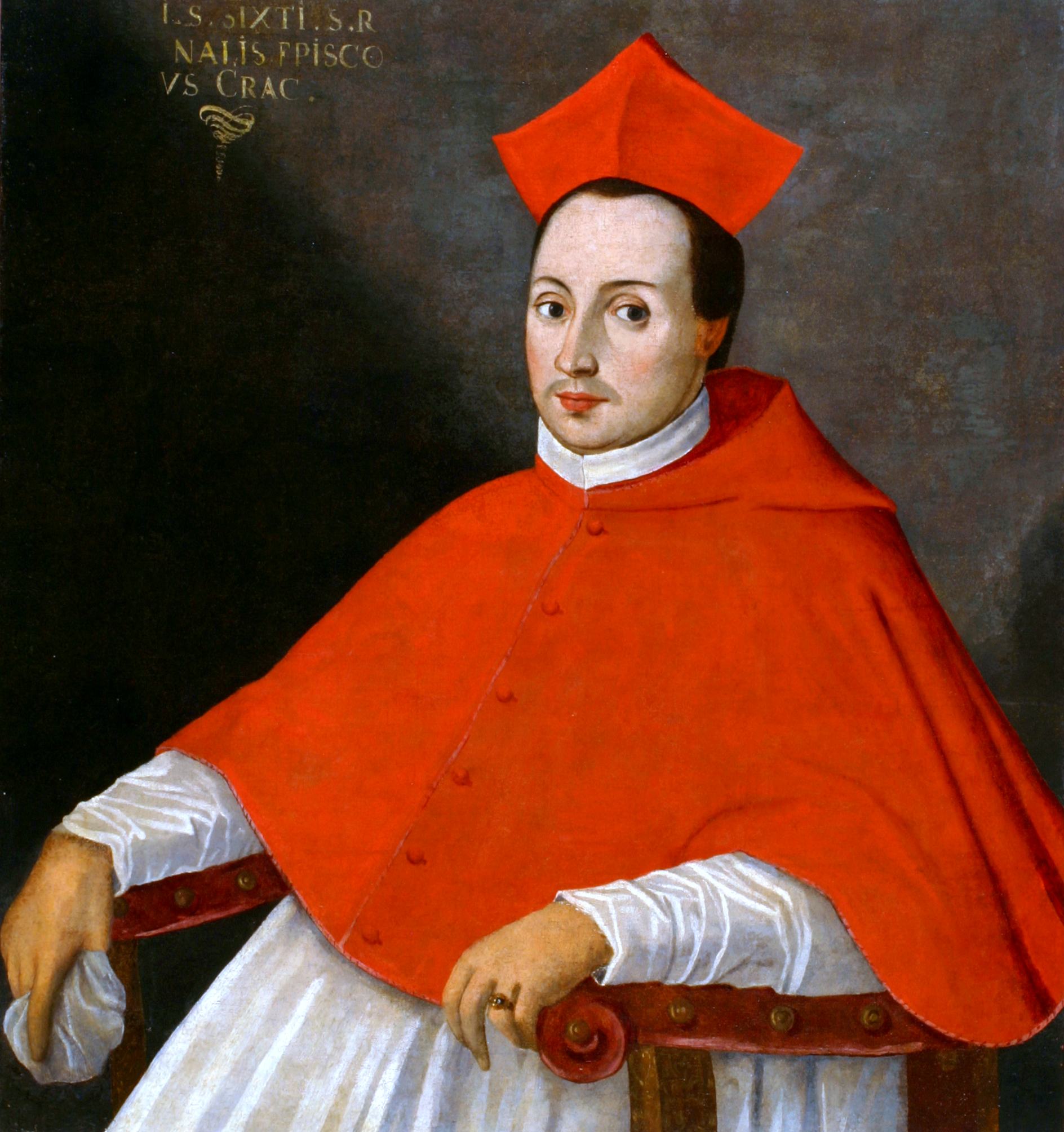
- Church: Roman Catholic Church
- Diocese: Vilnius
- In office: 1579–1600
- Other posts: Bishop of Kraków (1591–1600); Cardinal-Priest of San Sisto (1586–1600)

Orders
- Ordination: 10 April 1583 by Cyprian Wiliński
- Consecration: 26 December 1583 by Alberto Bolognetti
- Created cardinal: 12 December 1583 by Pope Gregory XIII
- Rank: Cardinal-Priest

Personal details
- Born: 31 May 1556 Vilnius, Grand Duchy of Lithuania
- Died: 21 January 1600 (aged 43) Rome, Papal States

Prince Jerzy Radziwiłł (Lithuanian: Jurgis Radvila; 31 May 1556 – 21 January 1600) was a Polish–Lithuanian magnate and Imperial Reichsfürst from the Radziwiłł family. He was ordained a Catholic priest and later rose through the ranks as Bishop of Vilnius eventually becoming a cardinal. He was a close friend and adviser of King Sigismund III and represented his interests in front of the Pope.

Raised a Calvinist, Radziwiłł was educated at the University of Leipzig. In 1572 he converted to Catholicism and became associated with the Jesuits. He continued to study at Jesuit colleges in Poznań, Vilnius, and Rome. Radziwiłł began his duties as Bishop of Vilnius in 1579. He established Vilnius Seminary in the family palace (called Kardynalia Palace after him) and helped to obtain university status for the Jesuit Academy in Vilnius. He was ordained to the priesthood (10 April 1583) and was not consecrated bishop until 26 December 1583. He was elevated to the cardinalate by Pope Gregory XIII only on 12 December 1583 and was assigned the titulus of S. Sisto on 14 July 1586. He did not participate in the 1585 papal conclave, which elected Pope Sixtus V; or the September 1590 papal conclave, which elected Pope Urban VII; or the October–December 1590 papal conclave, which elected Pope Gregory XIV. In 1591, he became Bishop of Kraków. He did participate in the 1591 papal conclave, which elected Pope Innocent IX; and in the 1592 papal conclave, which elected Pope Clement VIII.

Radziwiłł was also involved in political life. He served as deputy administrator (namiestnik) of Polish Livonia (Inflanty) from 1582 until 1585. He participated in the 1587 election of King Sigismund III Vasa and became his trusted adviser. Radziwiłł supported the Third Statute of Lithuania (1588) and the Union of Brest (1596).

He came to Rome to participate in the Jubilee of 1600, but died in Rome on 21 January and was buried in the Church of the Gesu.

== Works ==
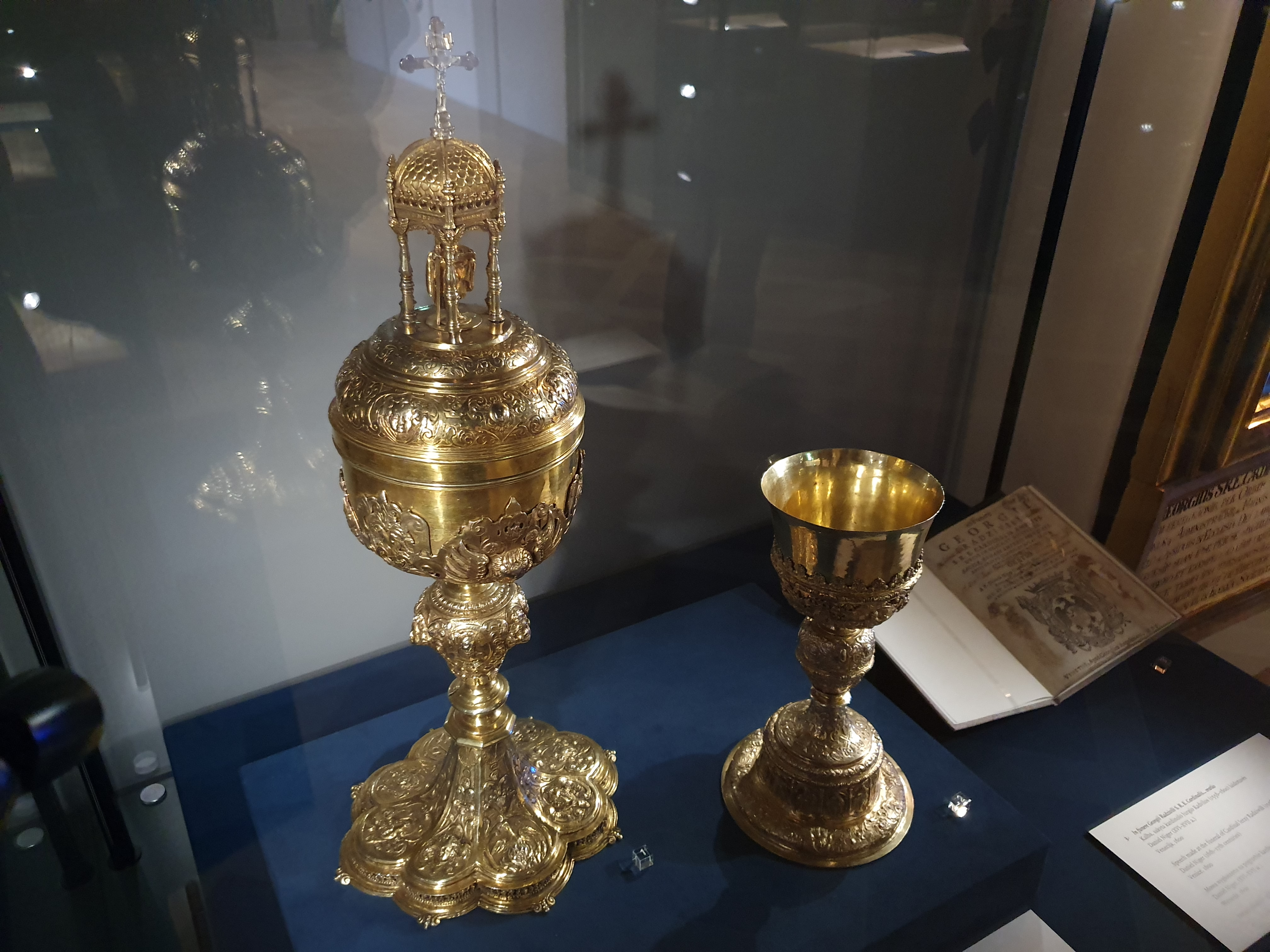
Jerzy Radziwiłł ordered ciborium and gifted chalice, 16th century

- "Diary of a trip to Italy in 1575." Wierzbowski diary published in Latin in 1899.
- The Notebook ... from 1556 to 1575, ed. T. Wierzbowski, Warsaw 1899, Library of Forgotten Polish poets and prose writers of the sixteenth and eighteenth centuries, Volume 12 (description in English. Livonia to join Latin Polish)
- Official trip to Italy ... in 1575 (in Polish. Latin), ed. H. Barycz Historical Quarterly 1935-copy manuscript: Czartoryski Library No. 2242, pp. 369–379.
- Letters to the pope, the Nuncio (Possewina?) And the Secretariat of State in the years 1575–1591, manuscripts Archives Vatican (news reported P. Savio "De actis Nuntiaturae Poloniae quae partem Archivi Secretariatus constituunt status", the Vatican in 1947, Theological Studies XIII, page 104 -106, 121.
- Individual letters from the years 1582–1583 to A. Bolognettiego and A. Possewina, ed. E. Kuntze and C. Nanke, Poloniae Monumenta Vaticana, Volume 5 (1923/1933), E. Kuntze Poloniae Monumenta Vaticana, Vol 6 (1938)
- The S. Sokolowski, dates. 2 August 1583 in Riga, ed. F. Bracha "Science S. Sokolowski has the characteristics of the true church," Our past 1947, vol 2, p 133.
- Letters from the years 1587–1597 to the Duke of Mantua, manuscripts Archivio di Stato in Mantua (news reported E. Czapski "Documents anglais dans les archives des Gonzagues à Mantoue", Antemurale (Rome), Vol 3 (1956).
- Single list of the years 1578, 1581 to 1583 from: Stefan Batory, A. Bolognettiego, Gregory XIII, ed. L. Boratyński Poloniae Monumenta Vaticana, Volume 4 (1915), E. Kuntze and C. Nanke, Monumenta Vaticana Poloniae, Vol 5 (1923/1933), E. Kuntze Poloniae Monumenta Vaticana, Vol 6 (1938).
- More than a dozen letters from the years 1578–1585 by J. Zamoyski, Ref.No. W. Nehring "Letters to the Radziwill Jan Zamoyski of the 1574–1602" Historical Quarterly 1890.
- From P. Complaints dates. 13 January 1588 in Kraków, ed. WA Maciejowski Polish Literature, Vol 3 extra, Warszawa 1852, pp. 181–183.
- From Sigismund III, dates. 18 July in Kraków, 14 December 1588 from genista, ed. JU Niemcewicz Collection of historical memoirs of former Polszcze, Volume 2, Warsaw 1822, pp. 466–469.
- From Sigismund III, dates. 11 March 1592 in Kraków, ed. T. Wierzbowski Materials on the history of Polish literature, Volume 1, Warszawa 1900, pp. 301–302.
- Letter from Garsias Alabianusa, dates. in Cracow, 4 June 1595 and the three documents concerning the visit of bishops from the years 1594 to 1599, Ref.No. F. Machay pastoral activity Radziwill Cardinal, Bishop of Cracow (1591–1600), Kraków 1936

For extra knowledge of letters and materials, see.: F. Machay pastoral activity Cardinal Radziwill, Bishop of Cracow (1591–1600), Kraków 1936 extra, O. Halecki "From florence to Brest (1439–1596)," The Sacred Poloniae Millennium, t 5 (1958).

Catholic Church titles
Preceded by Walerian Protasewicz	Bishop of Vilnius; 1579–1591	Succeeded by Benedykt Woyna
Preceded by Piotr Myszkowski	Bishop of Kraków; 1591–1600	Succeeded by Bernard Maciejowski
