= Pilies Street =

Street in Vilnius, Lithuania

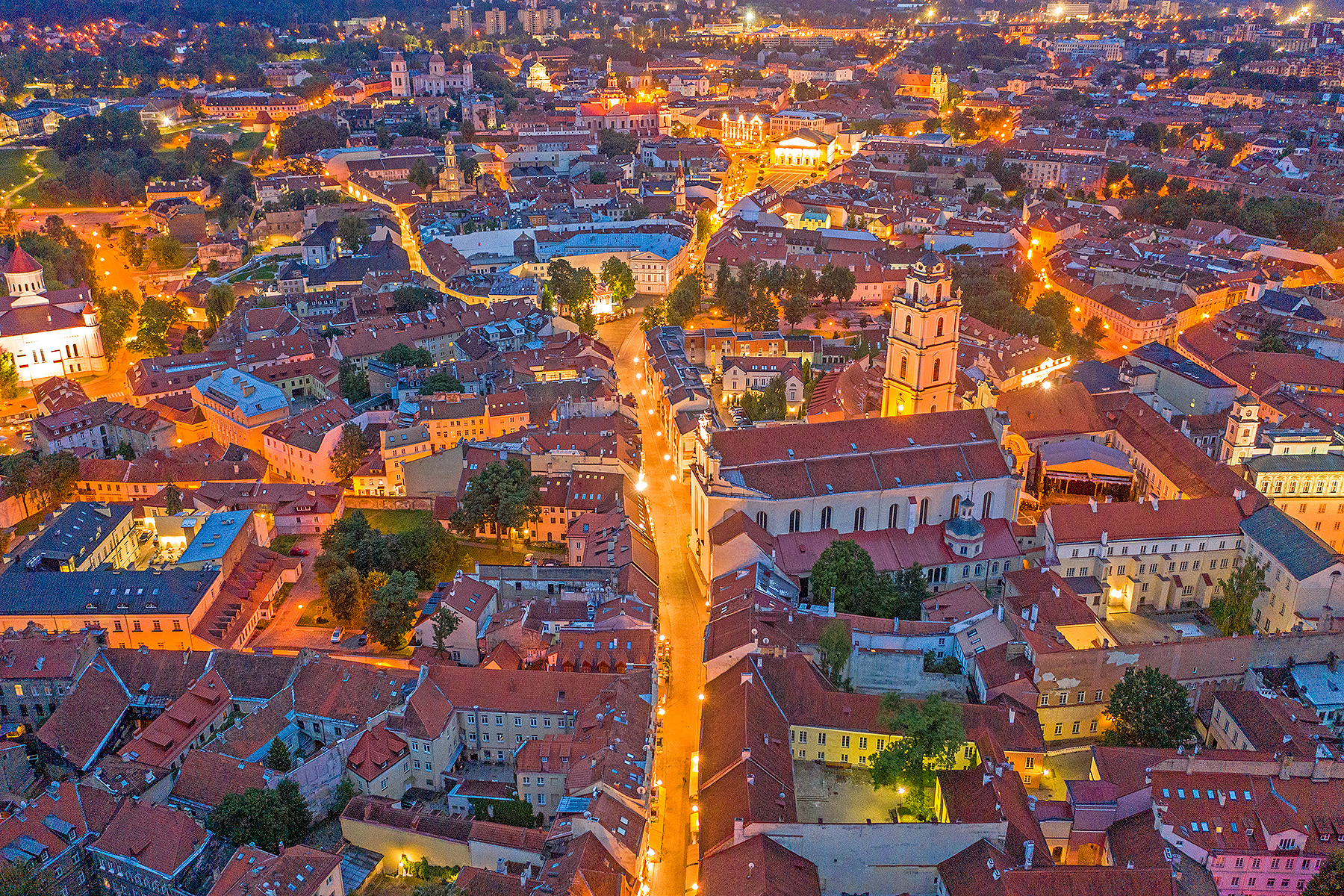
- Aerial photo of Pilies Street in July 2020
- Interactive map of Pilies Street
- Native name: Pilies gatvė (Lithuanian)
- Former name(s): Zamkowa (Wielka), Zamkovaya (Russian: Замковая), M. Gorkio
- Length: 500 m (1,600 ft)
- Location: Vilnius, Lithuania
- Postal code: LT-01123
- Coordinates: 54°41′04″N 25°17′21″E

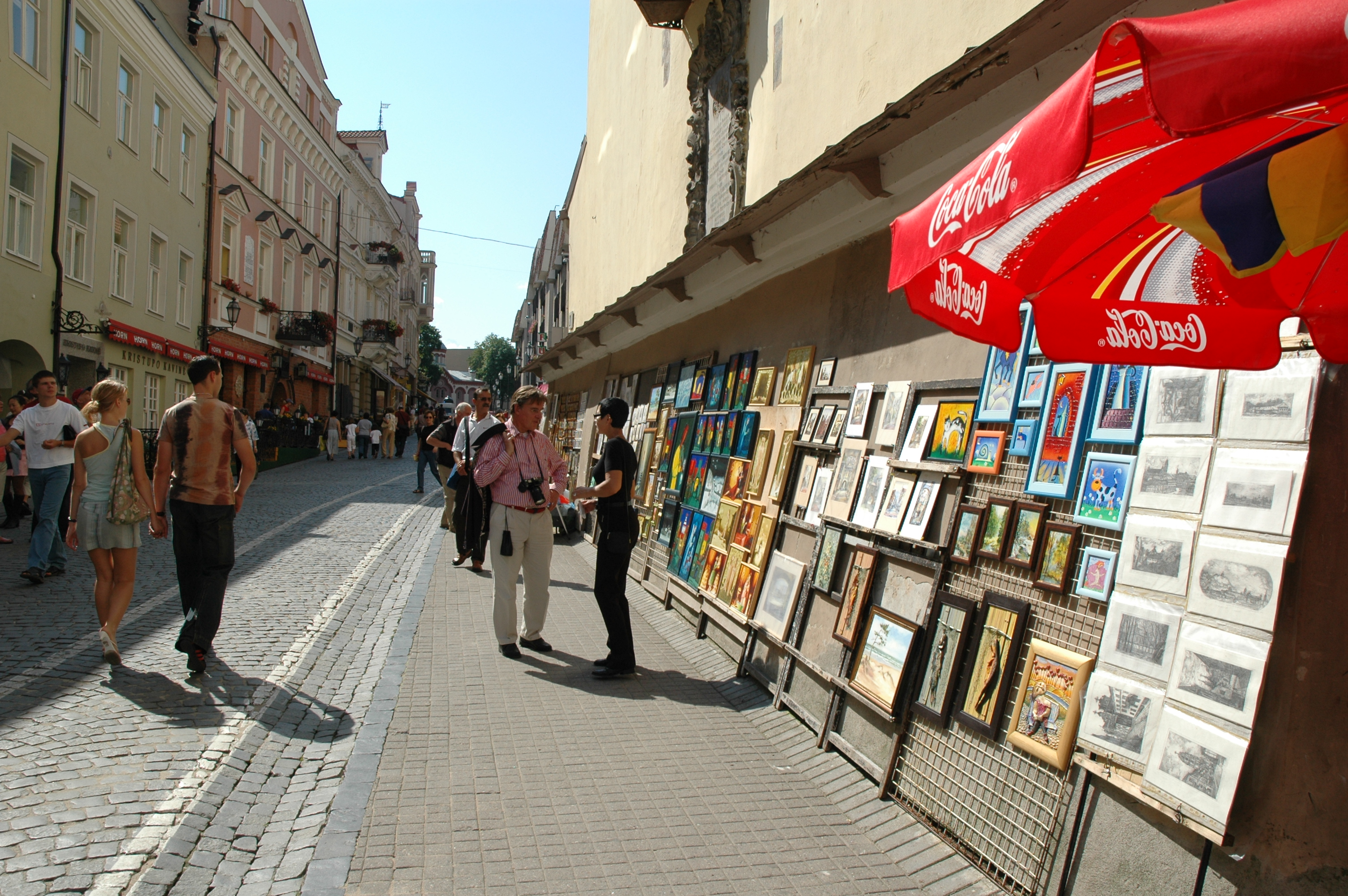
The street is also popular among sellers of paintings, souvenirs, handicrafts

Pilies Street (literally, "Castle Street"; Lithuanian: Pilies gatvė) is one of the main streets in the Old Town of Vilnius, the capital of Lithuania. It is a rather short street, running from Cathedral Square to the Town Hall Square.

Pilies Street is a popular location for market traders to sell the wares of folk artists. It has a natural advantage over the Town Hall Square as the street is generally busy and less likely to be interrupted by the political or cultural events commonly held at the Town Hall. Souvenir shops offer amberware and amber jewelry as well as linen clothes. The street is also known for the Kaziukas Fair, when folk artists from all over Lithuania gather here to display and sell their latest merchandise.

Festivals in Vilnius frequently take place on Pilies Street – most processions will make their way through here at some point. This is true whatever the festival – be it Christmas, Easter, the day of Restoration of Independence, or just a spontaneous celebration following a major win for the Lithuanian basketball team.

The headquarters of Vilnius University are located between Pilies Street and University Street, (Lithuanian: Universiteto gatvė). The House of the Signatories where the Declaration of Independence was signed on February 16, 1918, is also located on this street.
