= Church of St. Alexander, Varniai =

Church in Samogitia, Lithuania

Varniai St. Alexander's church
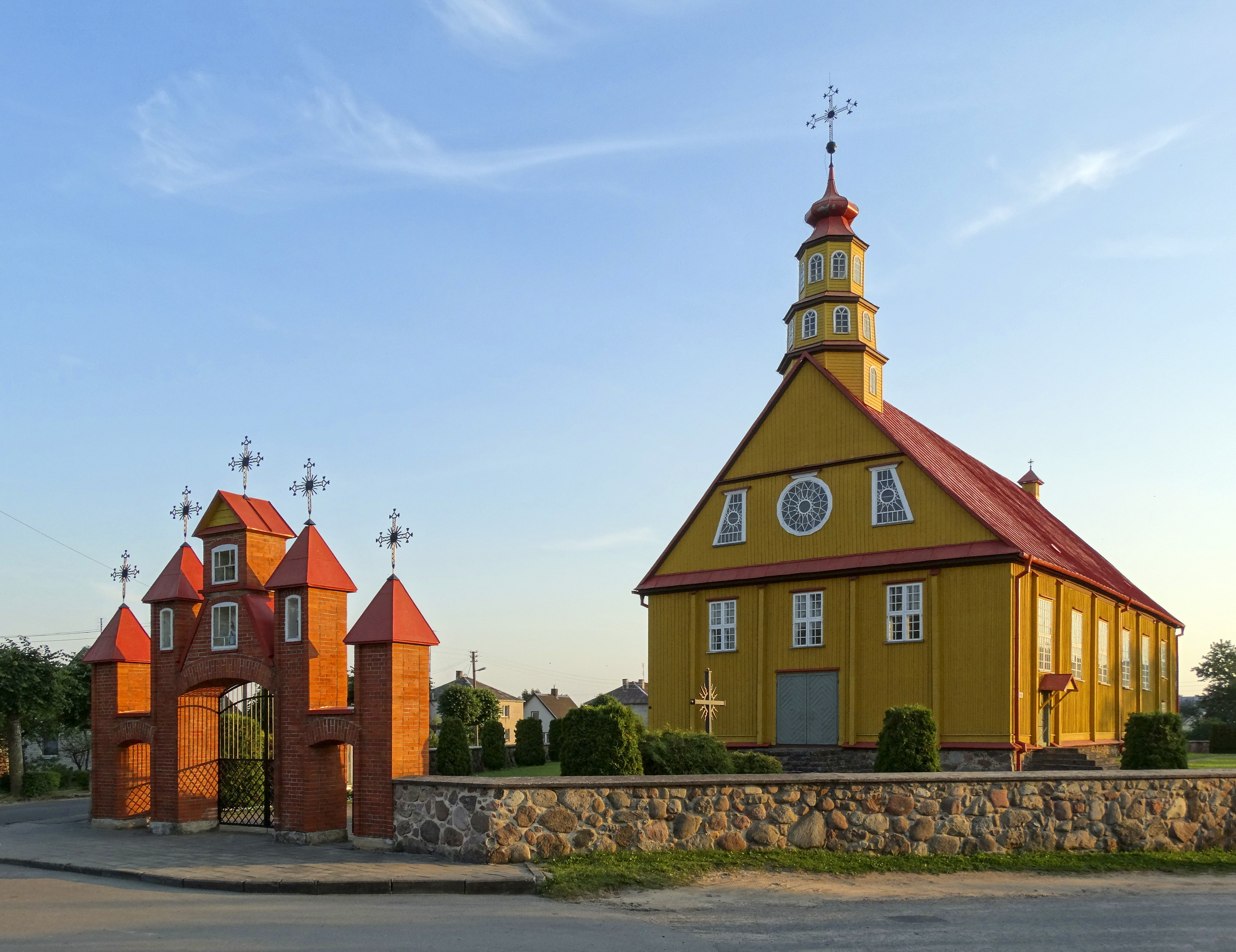
- Interactive map of the Varniai St. Alexander's church area

General information
- Type: St. Alexander's church in Varniai
- Location: Varniai, Lithuania
- Coordinates: 55.741604°N 22.369107°E

Website
- www.

St. Alexander's church in Varniai is the oldest church in Samogitia.

== History ==
Prior to the Medininkai diocese, which eventually became the Samogitian diocese, a parish church was already established in Varniai. At the location, now occupied by St. Alexander's church, there previously stood another church, built by Vytautas Magnus, which was consecrated in 1417 as St. Alexander's church, according to the Christian name of Vytautas Magnus.

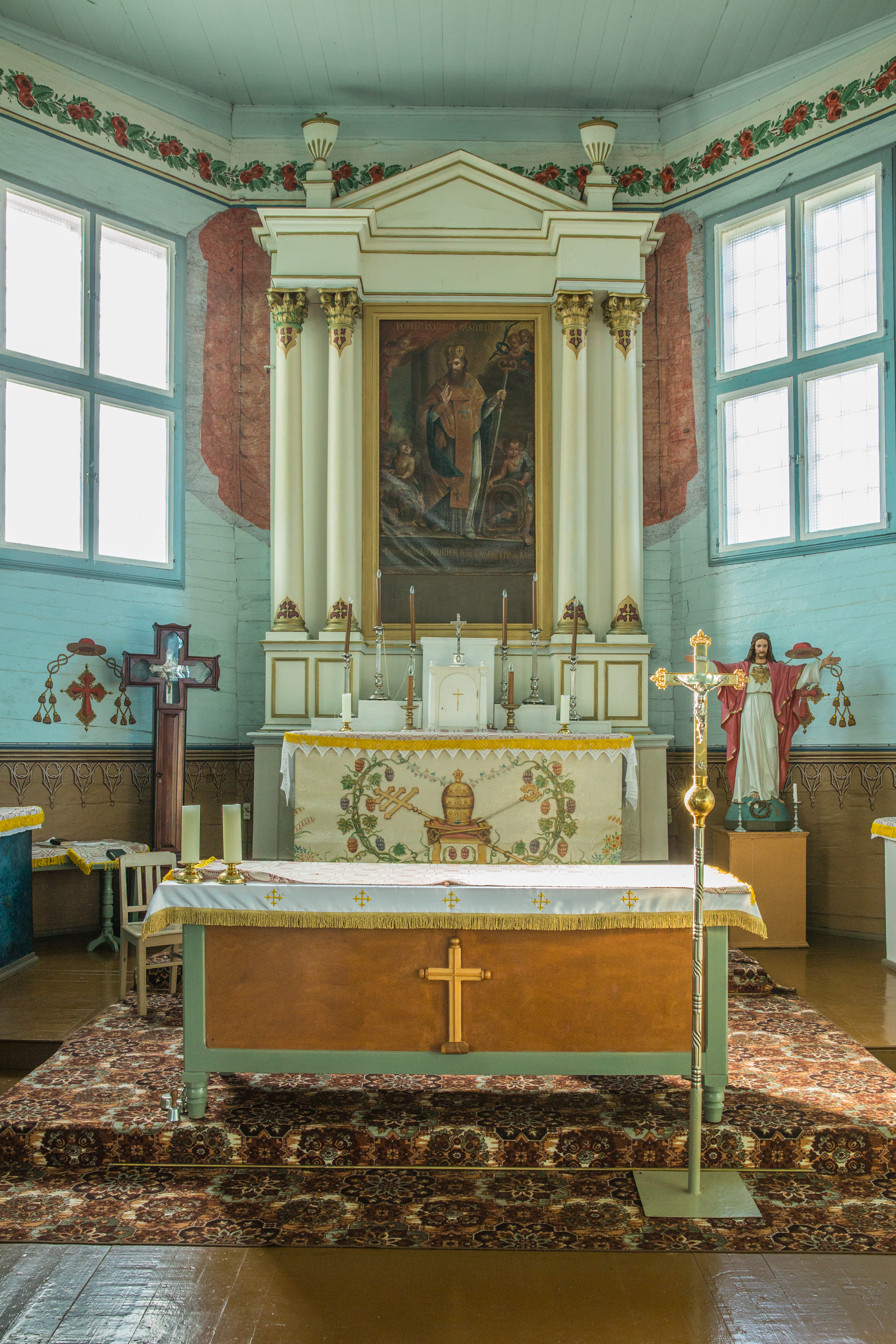
Altar of St. Alexander's church in Varniai

From the beginning of the 15th century, the church was rebuilt numerous times, and its present appearance was created in 1779. The building incorporates the characteristics of late Baroque and folk architecture. After WWII, St. Alexander's church was closed and damaged by the Soviet government. In 1991, it was restored, and returned to the religious community.

== Gallery ==
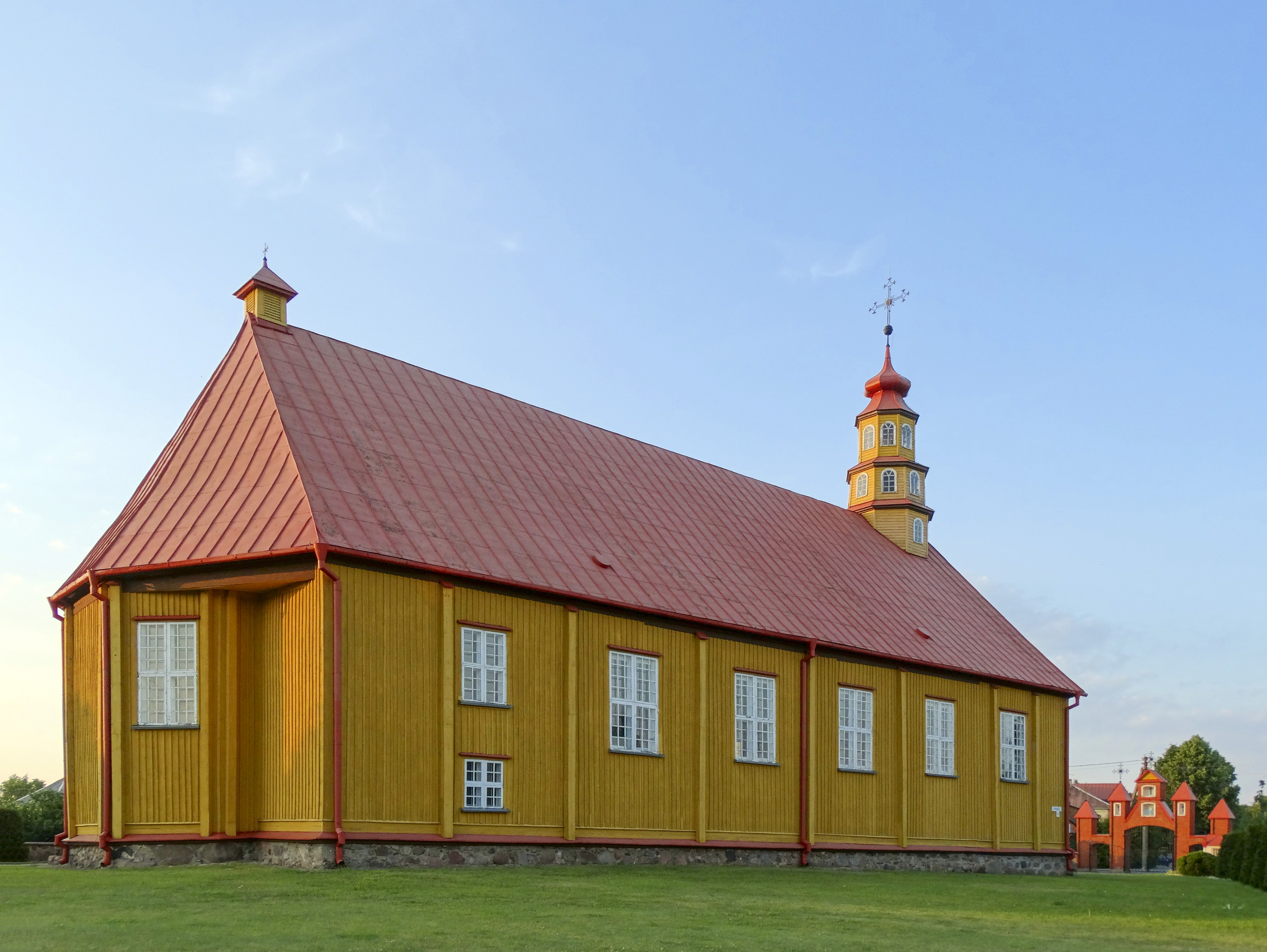

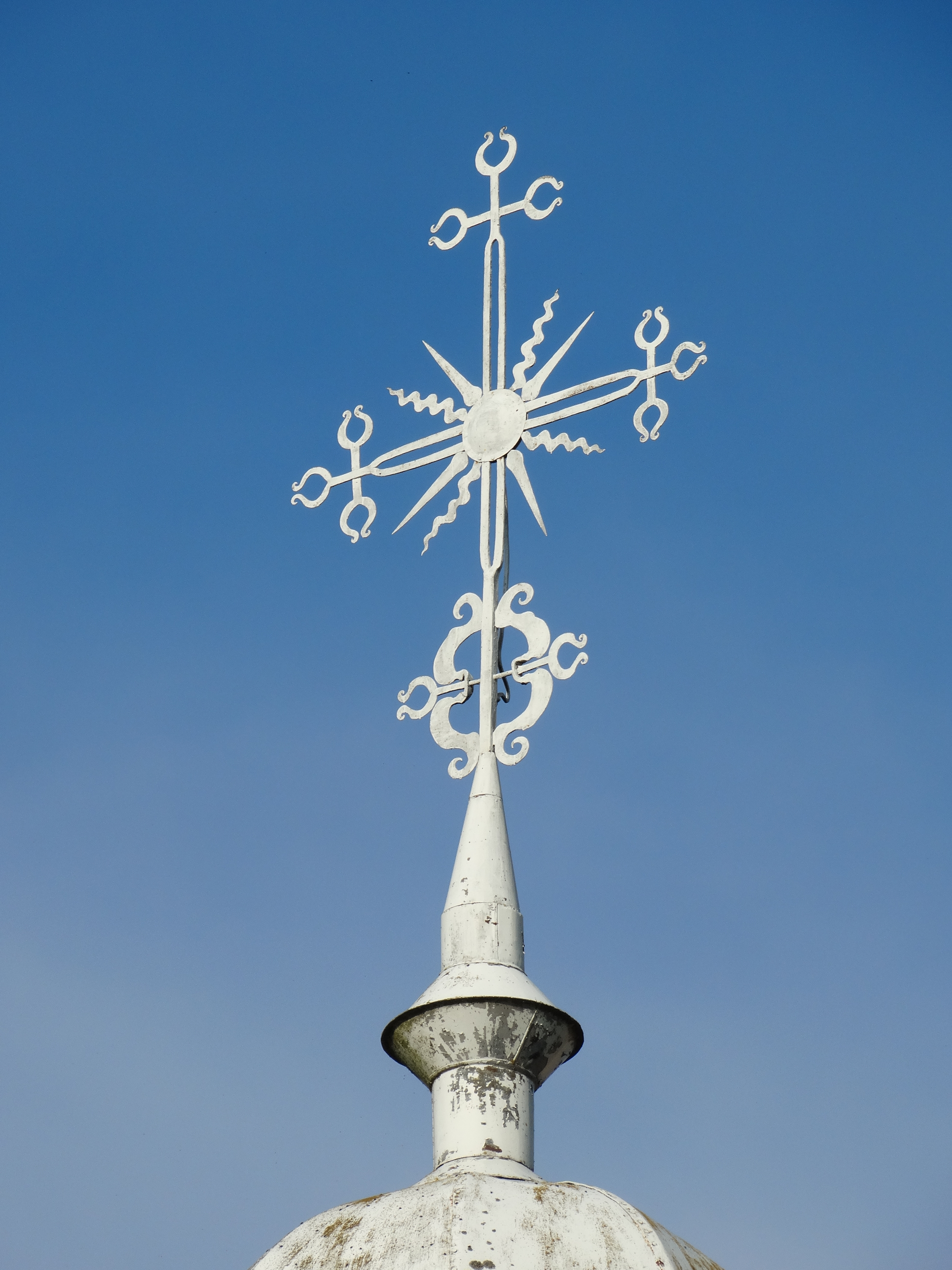

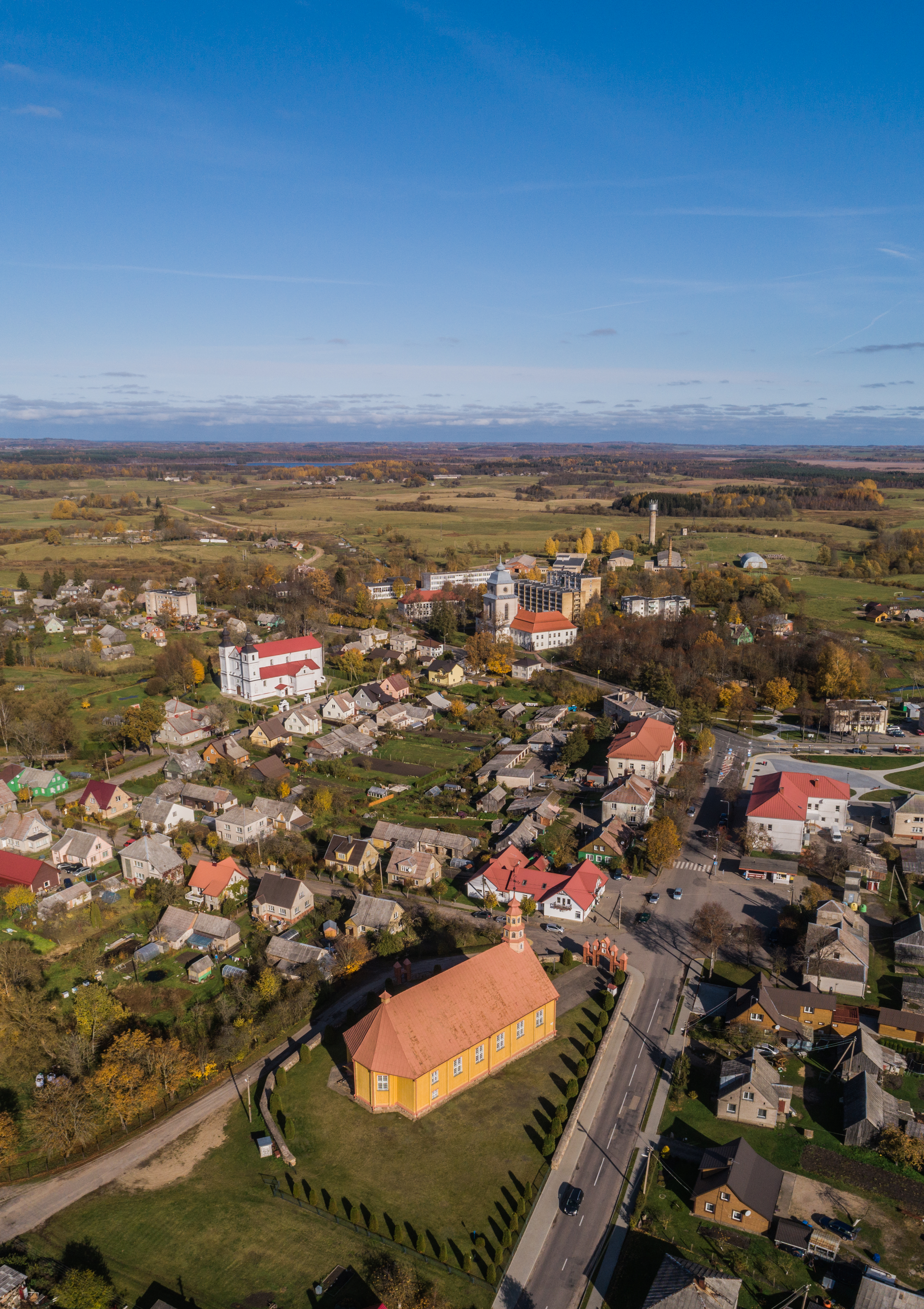

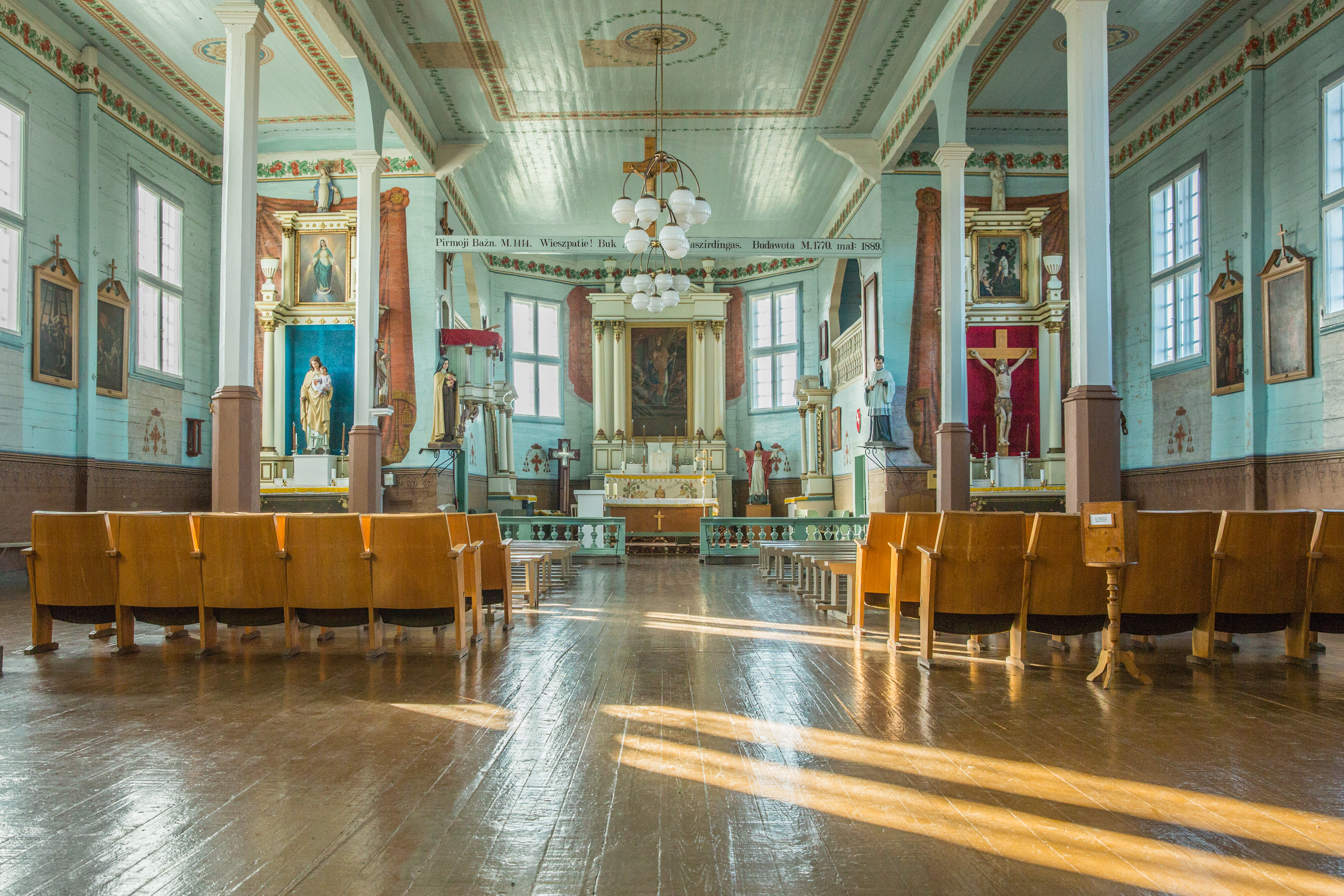

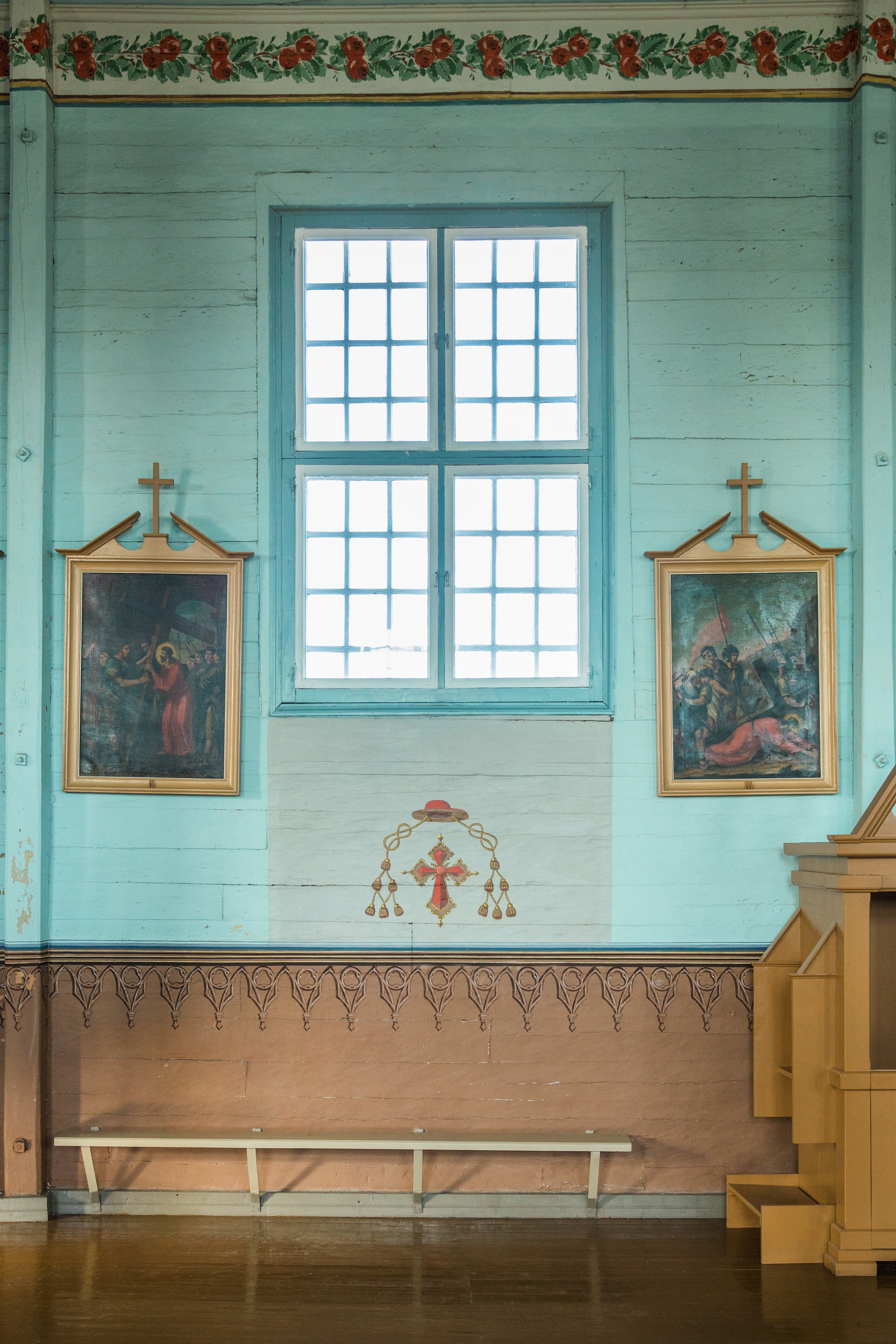

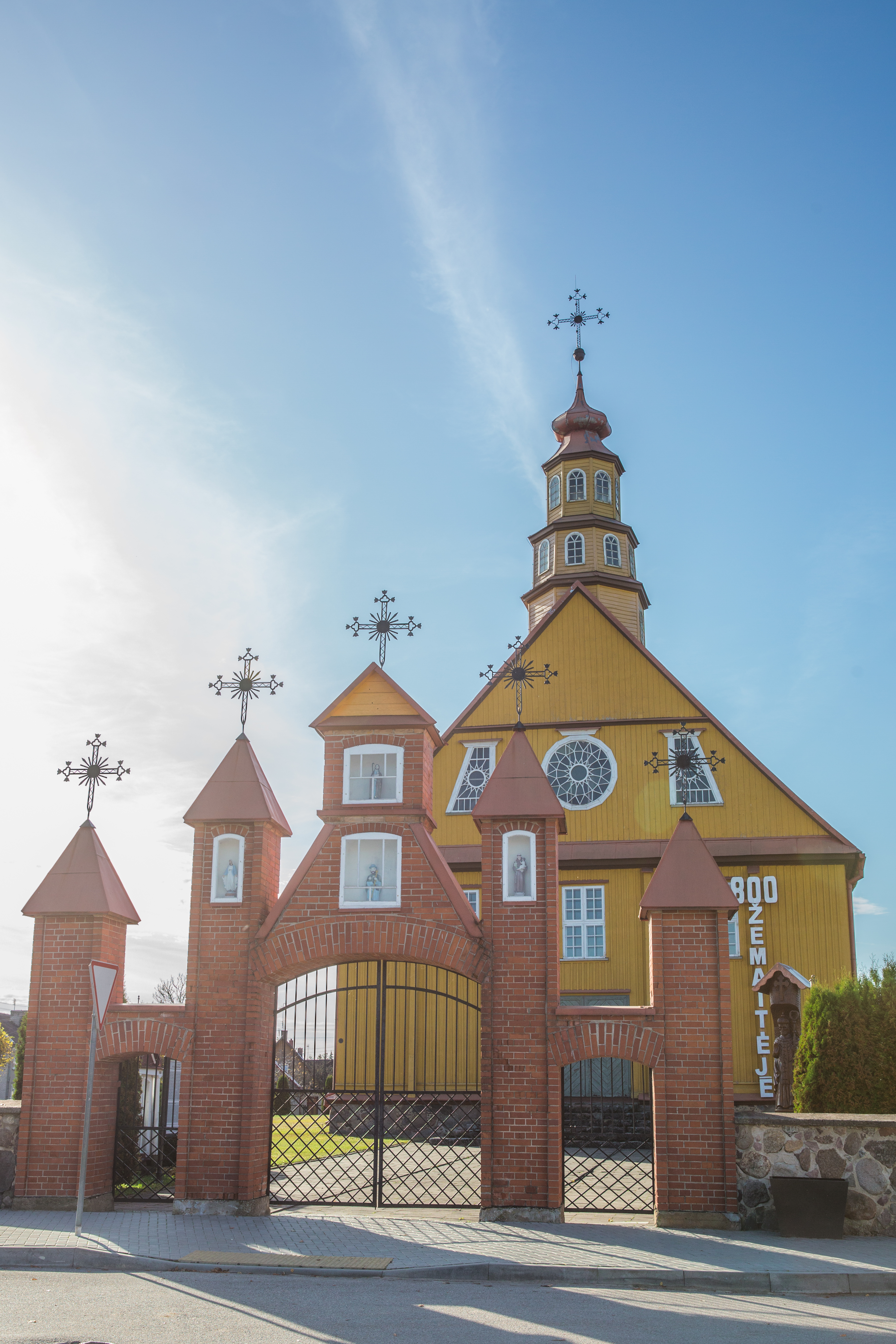

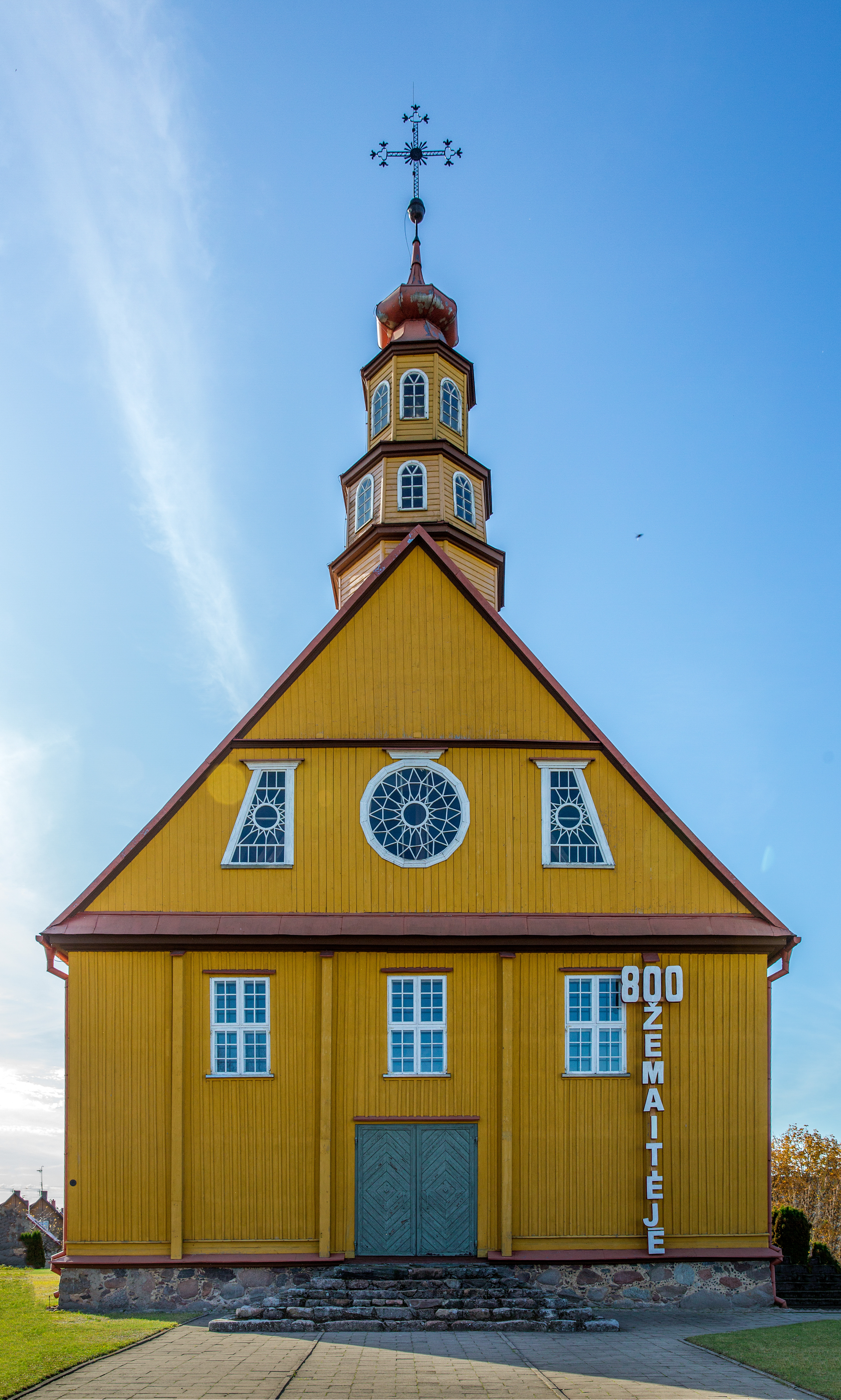
