= List of Balto-Slavic languages =

Balto-Slavic distribution

These are the Balto-Slavic languages categorized by sub-groups, including number of speakers.

== Baltic languages ==
- Latvian, 1.75 million speakers (2015)
- Latgalian, 164,000 speakers (2021) (Note: Alternatively considered a dialect of Latvian.)
- Lithuanian, 3 million speakers (2012)

== West Slavic languages ==
- Polish, 55 million speakers (2010)
- Kashubian (Note: Alternatively considered a dialect of Polish or Pomeranian.)
- Czech, 10.6 million speakers (2012)
- Slovak, 5.2 million speakers (2011–12)
- Sorbian, ca. 50,000 speakers (est.)

== South Slavic languages ==
- Serbo-Croatian, 21 million speakers (est.), including second language speakers
  - Bosnian, Croatian, Serbian and Montenegrin standards with dialectal differences
- Bulgarian, 9 million (2005–12)
- Slovene, 2.5 million speakers (2010)
- Macedonian, 1.4–3.5 million speakers (1986–2011)
- Church Slavonic (liturgical)

== East Slavic languages ==
- Russian, 150 million speakers (2010), 260 million including L2 (2012)
- Ukrainian, 45 million speakers (2007)
- Belarusian, 3.2 million speakers (2009)
- Rusyn (Note: Alternatively considered a dialect of Ukrainian.)

== Extinct languages ==
- Proto-Balto-Slavic language

Slavic

- Proto-Slavic
- Old Church Slavonic, liturgical
- Knaanic, Jewish language
- Old Novgorod dialect
- Old East Slavic, developed into modern East Slavic languages
- Old Ruthenian
- Polabian language
- Pomeranian language, only Kashubian remains as a living dialect
- South Slavic dialects used in medieval Greece

Baltic

- Proto-Baltic
- Curonian
- Old Prussian
- Selonian
- Semigallian
- Sudovian
- Dnieper-Oka
- Golyad
- Pomeranian Baltic
- West Galindian

== See also ==
- Outline of Slavic history and culture
- List of Slavic studies journals
