= West Galindian language =

Extinct Baltic language

West Galindian
- West Galindan
- Region: Northeastern Poland
- Ethnicity: Galindians
- Extinct: 14th century AD
- Language family: Indo-European: Balto-Slavic; Baltic; West Baltic; West Galindian

Language codes
- ISO 639-3: xgl
- Glottolog: west3001
- Former extent of West Baltic languages, including Galindian. Old Curonian † Old Prussian Sudovian † Skalvian † West Galindian †

West Galindian, commonly simply referred to as Galindian, is the poorly attested extinct Baltic language of the Galindians previously spoken in what is today northeastern Poland and thought to have been a dialect of Old Prussian, or a Western Baltic language similar to Old Prussian. There are no extant writings in Galindian.

== Phonology ==
=== Consonants ===
		Labial	Dental/ Alveolar		Post- alveolar	Velar
		Labial	plain	pal.	Post- alveolar	Velar
Nasal		m	n	nʲ		
Plosive	voiceless	p	t	tʲ		k
Plosive	voiced	b	d	dʲ	dʒ	ɡ
Fricative	voiceless	f	s		ʃ	
Fricative	voiced		z		ʒ	
Trill			r	rʲ		
Approximant			l	lʲ	j	

=== Vowels ===
	Front		Central		Back	
	short	long	short	long	short	long
High	i	iː			u	uː
Mid		eː				oː
Mid-low					ɔ	
Low			a	aː		
