= Sudovian language =

Extinct Western Baltic language

Sudovian
- Yotvingian, Jatvingian
- Native to: Yotvingia
- Extinct: 17th century
- Language family: Indo-European: Balto-Slavic; Baltic; West Baltic; Sudovian

Language codes
- ISO 639-3: xsv
- Glottolog: sudo1236
- Former extent of West Baltic languages, including Skalvian. Old Curonian † Old Prussian † Sudovian † Skalvian † West Galindian †

Sudovian (also known as Yotvingian, or Jatvingian) was a West Baltic language of Northeastern Europe. Sudovian was closely related to Old Prussian. It was formerly spoken southwest of the Neman river in what is now Lithuania, east of Galindia and in the north of Yotvingia, and by exiles in East Prussia.

== Name ==
The language is referred to as Yotvingian, Jatvingian or Sudovian. Those names are derived from the southern- and northernmost tribes living in the area. When the Germans learnt the name "Sudovian" from the Prussians, they got to know the name of the northernmost tribe only, while Poles in the south met a tribe calling itself Yatvingian. Both Germans and Poles generalized the terms for all the Baltic inhabitants of the area.

The territory they lived in is referred to as Sudovia [Sunderland], Jotva [Jettwen], Dainavia, or Pollexia.

== Classification ==
Sudovian was an Indo-European language belonging to the Baltic branch. There are several proposals for the classification of the Sudovian language within the Baltic family.

- Bezzenberg postulated that Sudovian was a southern Lithuanian dialect.
- Otrębski claimed it to be a transitional language between East and West Baltic.
- Some consider it a distinct West Baltic language close to Old Prussian.
- Others view it as an Old Prussian dialect.

Historical sources state that Sudovian was very similar to and mutually intelligible with the archaic Old Prussian language, e.g. in the introduction to the first Old Prussian Catechism (printed in Königsberg in 1545, the first book in a Baltic language):

Die Sudawen aber wiewol ihre rede etwas nyderiger wissen sich doch inn diese preüßnische sprach : wie sie alhie im Catechismo gedruckt ist auch wol zuschicken und vernemen alle wort.
– "But the Sudovians, although their speech is somewhat lower, understand this Prussian language, as it is printed in the Catechism, and they express themselves well and understand every word".

In addition to similarities in the scarce material in the Western Baltic languages, this leads most linguists to the conclusion that Sudovian belongs to the Western Baltic branch. Sudovian along with Old Prussian was later influenced by Gothic, while most of the East Baltic languages had more contact with Finnic languages.

== History ==
Distribution of the Baltic tribes, circa 1200 CE (boundaries are approximate).

Sudovia and neighboring Galindia were two Baltic tribes or nations mentioned by the Greek geographer Ptolemy in the 2nd century AD as Galíndai and Soudinoí (Γαλίνδαι, Σουδινοί).

Peter of Dusburg, in his 14th-century Chronicon terrae Prussiae, refers to Sudovia and to its inhabitants as Sudovites, listing them as one of the Prussian tribes. He attests, that between 1,500 and 1,600 Sudavians were forcefully relocated to Sambia in the late 13th century.

After the district was conquered by the Teutonic Knights, the language died out and its speakers were gradually absorbed by German, Lithuanian and Slavic populations.

John Poliander wrote in 1535 about the Sudovians living near Königsberg, Prussia, that 32 villages used Sudini speech in a 6-7 mile stretch of land of the Samland Corner that bears the name of Sudavia. They spoke a language similar to the Old Prussian language, but they used the term gentaras for amber, not the Sambian (Old Prussian) term. From him we learn that the Sudovians lived secluded from the Sambians, that they married within their own tribe, and did not allow intermarriage with the neighbouring Prussian population "even if begged". They stubbornly held to their own traditions, and wore finger and ear rings with bronze bells and silver belts. Nothing was imported from abroad, but everything was produced by local craftsmen.

Christoph Hartknoch reported in 1684 that there were still Sudovians in Sambia.

== Phonology ==
=== Consonants ===
Based on onomastics, Sudovian is thought to have had the following consonants:

		Labial		Dental/ Alveolar		Post- alveolar	Velar	
		plain	pal.	plain	pal.	Post- alveolar	plain	pal.
Nasal		m	mʲ	n	nʲ			
Plosive	voiceless	p	pʲ	t			k	kʲ
Plosive	voiced	b	bʲ	d			ɡ	ɡʲ
Fricative	voiceless			s		ʃ		
Fricative	voiced	v	vʲ	z		ʒ		
Trill				r				
Approximant				l		j		

- Compared to other Baltic languages, [rʲ], [lʲ], [zʲ], [ʒʲ], [sʲ], and [ʃʲ] were depalatalized.
- A Partial depalatalization of [mʲ], [vʲ], [pʲ], and [bʲ] took place.
- [tʲ] and [dʲ] turned into [kʲ] and [gʲ] respectively.

=== Vowels ===
==== Diphthongs ====
Two diphthongs are attested:

	Front	Back
Mid	ei	
Open		au

- Along with Prussian, Sudovian preserved Proto-Baltic */ei/, unlike the East Baltic languages, where it shifted to /ie/.

== Grammar ==
The few grammatical features proposed for the Sudovian languages are either based on supposed Sudovian substrate in other languages or based on the Polish-Yotvingian Vocabulary (it is unsure, whether or not it represents Sudovian). Therefore, few can be said with certainty.

The language seems to have preserved many archaic features, which have been lost in other Baltic languages. The language from the vocabulary retained the Proto-Baltic singular neuter case endings (as did Prussian), leaving the language with three genders.

The language has six grammatical cases: nominative, vocative (The vocative example is "Kails naussen gnigethe." form the Sudovian Book), accusative, genitive, dative and locative, and a complex morphology with a variety of moods. It was a frontier dialect of Old Baltic, which preserved many archaic features which had been lost in the Middle Baltic group.

== Corpus of the Sudovian language ==
=== Onomastics ===
The Constit. Synod. Evangel. of 1530 contains the following list of deities who were still worshipped by the Sudavians in Samland: "Occopirmus, Sualxtix, Ausschauts, Autrympus, Potrympus, Bardoayts, Piluuytis, Parcunas, Pecols,...".

Toponyms from north-eastern Poland, north-western Belarus, and Lithuania also preserve words.

=== Evidence from other languages ===
The Yotvingian territories were later overrun and populated by Slavs around present-day Białystok and Suwałki in north-eastern Poland and nearby Hrodna (formerly Grodno) in Belarus. Some elements of Baltic speech are still retained in the Belarus and Ukraine territory, owing to the sparse indigenous populations and resettlements of refugees from Lithuania. The dialect of Zietela (Belarusian: Дзятлава, Russian: Дятлово, Yiddish: Zietil, Polish: Zdzięcioł) was of particular interest. Kazlauskas suggested that the word mėnas ("month") (dative singular mënui) encountered in dialects (Zietela, Lazdijai) and in the writings of Bretkūnas is a remnant of nouns with the stem suffix -s. The dialect of Druskininkai in Lithuania, too, was influenced by the Sudovian language.

=== Fragmentary texts ===
There are also some Sudovian language phrases in "Warhafftige Beschreibung der Sudawen auff Samland sambt ihren Bock heyligen und Ceremonien" – True Description of the Sudovians in Samland together with their goat sanctifications and ceremonies – written in the mid-16th century by Hieronymus Maletius. Most scholars view these texts as representing Old Prussian, while Norbertas Vėlius regards them as genuine Sudovian.

- Beigeite beygeyte peckolle.
- Kails naussen gnigethe.
- Kails poskails ains par antres. (a drinking toast)
- Kellewesze perioth, Kellewesze perioth.
- Ocho Moy myle schwante Panike.

=== Polish-Yotvingian vocabulary ===
Until the 1970s, Yotvingian was chiefly known from toponyms and medieval Russian sources. But in 1978, a monument with Yotvingian writing was discovered by accident. In Belarus, a young man named Viačasłaŭ Zinaŭ, an amateur collector, bought a book of Catholic prayers from an old man from Novy Dvor village in the depths of Białowieża Forest, which held a small manuscript titled "Pagan Dialects from Narew" (Pogańskie gwary z Narewu). It was written partly in Polish, and partly in an unspecified, "pagan" language. However, Zinov's parents threw away the book. But, before the manuscript was destroyed, Zinov had made notes of it which he sent to Vilnius University in 1983. Even though Zinov's notes were riddled with errors, it has been proven beyond doubt that the notes are indeed a copy of an authentic Yotvingian text. According to the first person who analyzed the manuscript, Zigmas Zinkevičius, this short Yotvingian–Polish dictionary (of just 215 words (Note: In fact there were 214 words, since one Polish word, bośian (Modern Polish bocian 'stork'), was translated three times, with two translations, starkas and gerwe identified, while the third one, aucm, was not, whereas to a Russian speaker it is immediately evident that it is a cursive writing for the Russian word "аист" for "stork"; probably a note by Zinov for himself.)), "Pagan Dialects from Narew", appears to have been written by a Catholic priest in order to preach to locals in their mother tongue. Concerning the language, Zinkevičius put forth three possible versions:

- a Yotvingian dialect under a heavy influence of Lithuanian;
- Lithuanian words over a strong Yotvingian substratum;
- the compiler of the dictionary could not tell Lithuanian from Yotvingian clearly, and may have included words from both. The latter version is indirectly supported by the name of the document: "Dialects", rather than "Dialect". Some scholars did not rule out the possibility of forgery, but there are strong indications it was not.

== See also ==
- Yotvingians / Sudovians
- Sudovian glossary (Narew) on Wiktionary

== Bibliography ==
- Kapović, Mate (2008), Uvod u indoeuropsku lingvistiku (in Croatian), Zagreb: Matica hrvatska, pp. 96–97, ISBN 978-953-150-847-6
- Catechiſmus jn Peüßniſcher ſprach, Königsberg, Hans Weinreich, 1545, p. 3
  - 2nd edition: Catechiſmus jn preüßniſcher ſprach, gecorrigiret vnd dagegen das deüdsche, Königsberg, Hans Weinreich, 1545
- Hartknoch, Christophorus, Alt- und Neues Preussen. Franckfurt & Leipzig, 1684 (Google Books)
- Būga, K., Kalba ir senovė, I, Vilnius, 1922, p. 78
- Būga, K., Lietuvių kalbos žodynas, I, Vilnius, 1924, p. LXXV
- Kazlauskas J., 1968, Lietuvių Kalbos Istorinė Gramatika [Historical Grammar of Lithuanian], Vilnius, 1968, p 285
- Salys, A., Sūduviai [including Sūdovian language], Sūduvių Kampas. Liet. Enciklopedija, XXIX, Boston, USA, 1963, pp 114–126
- Schmalstieg, W. R., Studies in Old Prussian, (1976) University Park and London, pp 17–23, 91–93, ISBN 0-271-01231-5
- Mažiulis, V., Prūsų kalbos paminklai, t. II (1981) Vilnius, pp 62–64, 67–68.
- Mažiulis, V., Prūsų kalbos etimologijos žodynas, t. IV, (1997) Vilnius, pp 166–167, ISBN 5-420-01406-8
- Vidugiris, A., Zietelos Šnektos žodynas [A Dictionary of the Subdialect of Zietela.], Vilnius: Mokslo ir enciklopedijų leidybos institutas, 1998
- Vidugiris, A., Mikulėnienė, D, ZIETELOS ŠNEKTOS TEKSTAI. I dalis [Texts of the Zietela Subdialect. Part I], Vilnius, 2005, ISBN 9986-668-73-5 (1 dalis), ISBN 9986-668-74-3 (2 dalys)
- Mikuleniene, D., Concerning the Influence of the Western Balts on the Accentuation System of Western Lithuanian Dialects, Acta Baltico-Slavica, Instytut Slawistyki Polskiej Akademii Nauk, 2006, vol: 30, pp 89–96
- Naktinienė, G., Paulauskienė, A., Vitkauskas, V., Druskininkų tarmės žodynas, Vilnius 1988
- Zinkevičius, Zigmas, Lietuvių kalbos dialektologija, Vilnius 1994
- Zinkevičius, Zigmas, Lietuvių dialektologija, Vilnius 1966
- Zinkevičius, Zigmas (1996). The history of the Lithuanian language. Vilnius: Mokslo ir enciklopedijų leidykla. pp. 50–53. ISBN 5-420-01363-0.
- Zinkevičius Zigmas, Lenkų-jotvingių žodynėlis? – Rinktiniai straipsniai. T. I. Vilnius, 2002. P. 30–60.
- Zinkevičius, Zigmas, Nauja apie jotvingių kalbą – Rinktiniai straipsniai. T. I. Vilnius, 2002. P. 61–66.
- Gimbutas, Marija, The Balts, (1963) London : Thames and Hudson, pp 19, 22–23, 83, 112, 126, 139, 141, 147, 159.
- Gerullis, G., Zur Sprache der Sudauer-Jatwinger. Festschrift Bezzenberger, 1921, p. 44
- Hastings, J., Encyclopaedia of Religion and Ethics: Volume IX, New York: Charles Scribner's Sons, 1917, pp 488
