= Samogitian language =

Eastern Baltic language spoken in Lithuania

Samogitian
- žemaitiu kalba
- Native to: Lithuania
- Region: Samogitia
- Native speakers: < 500,000 (2009)
- Language family: Indo-European: Balto-Slavic; Baltic; East Baltic; Lithuanian; Samogitian

Language codes
- ISO 639-3: sgs
- Glottolog: samo1265
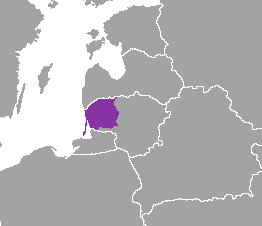
- Area where Samogitian is spoken

Samogitian (endonym: žemaitiu kalba or sometimes žemaitiu rokunda, žemaitiu šnekta or žemaitiu ruoda; Lithuanian: žemaičių tarmė, žemaičių kalba; Polish: język żmudzki) is an Eastern Baltic language spoken primarily in Samogitia, that is often considered a dialect of Lithuanian.

It has preserved many features of the extinct Curonian language, such as specific phonological traits and vocabulary. Samogitian differs significantly from standard Lithuanian in phonetics, morphology, syntax, and lexis, and retains unique features from Old Lithuanian not found in any other lect. This difference often causes speakers of Aukštaitian to not be able to understand speakers of Samogitian. The use of Samogitian is currently in decline, with limited presence in media and education. Efforts are being made to preserve the language, including local initiatives and cultural societies.

== History ==
The Samogitians, Lithuanians and other Baltic tribes, around the year 1200

Samogitian, heavily influenced by Curonian, originated from the East Baltic proto-Samogitian which was close to Aukštaitian.

During the 5th century, Proto-Samogitians migrated from the lowlands of central Lithuania, near Kaunas, into the Dubysa and Jūra basins, as well as into the Samogitian Upland. They displaced or assimilated the local, Curonian-speaking Baltic populations. Further north, they displaced or assimilated the indigenous Semigallian-speaking peoples. Assimilation of Curonians and Semigallians gave birth to the three Samogitian dialects.

In the 13th century, Žemaitija became a part of the Baltic confederation called Lietuva (Lithuania), which was formed by Mindaugas. Lithuania conquered the coast of the Baltic Sea from the Livonian order. The coast was populated by Curonians, but became a part of Samogitia. From the 13th century onwards, Samogitians settled within the former Curonian lands, and intermarried with the population over the next three hundred years. The Curonians were assimilated by the 16th century, but the historical influence of the former Curonian language on Samogitian can still be observed, particularly in relation to phonetics.

The earliest writings in Samogitian appeared in the 19th century.

== Phonology ==
Samogitian and its dialects preserved many features of the Curonian language, for example:

- widening of proto Baltic short i (i → ė sometimes e)
- widening of proto Baltic short u (u → o)
- preservation of West Baltic diphthong ei (standard Lithuanian ie → Samogitian ėi)
- no t' d' palatalization to č dž (Latvian š, ž)
- specific lexis, like cīrulis (lark), pīle (duck), leitis (Lithuanian) etc.
- retraction of stress
- shortening of ending -as to -s like in Latvian and Old Prussian (Proto-Indo-European o-stem)

as well as various other features not listed here.

	Front		Central		Back		
High	i	ɪ			(ɤ)	ʊ	u
Mid	e	e̞			(ɤ)	ɔ	o
Low	æ	ɛ	ɐ	a			

(ɤ) ė may be retracted in some dialects to form (ɤ) represented by the letter õ. Tėkrus → tõkrus, lėngvus → lõngvus, tėn → tõn. The vowel can be realized as close-mid central [ɘ] or close-mid back [ɤ], depending on the speaker.

		Labial	Dental/ Alveolar	Postalveolar/ Palatal	Velar
Nasal		m ⟨m⟩	n ⟨n⟩	ɲ ⟨ni⟩	
Stop	voiceless	p ⟨p⟩	t ⟨t⟩	c ⟨ki⟩	k ⟨k⟩
Stop	voiced	b ⟨b⟩	d ⟨d⟩	ɟ ⟨gi⟩	ɡ ⟨g⟩
Affricate	voiceless		t͡s ⟨c⟩	t͡ʃ ⟨č⟩	
Affricate	voiced		d͡z ⟨dz⟩	d͡ʒ ⟨dž⟩	
Fricative	voiceless	(f) ⟨f⟩	s ⟨s⟩	ʃ ⟨š⟩	(x) ⟨ch⟩
Fricative	voiced	v ⟨v⟩	z ⟨z⟩	ʒ ⟨ž⟩	(ɣ) ⟨h⟩
Approximant			l ⟨l⟩	ʎ ⟨li⟩	
Tap/flap			(ɾ) ⟨r⟩		
Trill			r ⟨r⟩		

(f) f, (x) ch, (ɣ) h are only found in loanwords.

== Grammar ==
The Samogitian language is highly inflected like standard Lithuanian, in which the relationships between parts of speech and their roles in a sentence are expressed by numerous flexions. There are two grammatical genders in Samogitian – feminine and masculine. Relics of historical neuter are almost fully extinct while in standard Lithuanian some isolated forms remain. Those forms are replaced by masculine ones in Samogitian. Samogitian stress is mobile but often retracted at the end of words, and is also characterised by pitch accent. Samogitian has a broken tone like the Latvian and Danish languages. The circumflex of standard Lithuanian is replaced by an acute tone in Samogitian.

It has five noun and three adjective declensions. Noun declensions are different from standard Lithuanian (see the next section). There are only two verb conjugations. All verbs have present, past, past iterative and future tenses of the indicative mood, subjunctive (or conditional) and imperative moods (both without distinction of tenses) and infinitive. The formation of past iterative is different from standard Lithuanian. There are three numbers in Samogitian: singular, plural and dual. Dual is almost extinct in standard Lithuanian. The third person of all three numbers is common. Samogitian as the standard Lithuanian has a very rich system of participles, which are derived from all tenses with distinct active and passive forms, and several gerund forms. Nouns and other declinable words are declined in eight cases: nominative, genitive, dative, accusative, instrumental, locative (inessive), vocative and illative.

== Literature ==
The earliest text in Samogitian appeared in the 16th century (Catechism of Martynas Mažvydas, primarily written in south Samogtian), with more in the second half of the 18th century (the first being Ziwatas Pona Yr Diewa Musu Jezusa Christusa in 1759, written in north Samogitian). More writings in appear in the 19th century. Famous authors writing in Samogitian:

- Birutė, by Silvestras Teofilis Valiūnas (1823)
- Šešės pasakas (Six fables), by Simonas Stanevičius (1829)
- Būds Senovės Lietuviu Kalnienu ir Zamaitiu, by Simonas Daukantas (1854)
- Palangos Juzė (Joseph of Palanga), by Motiejus Valančius (1869)

There are no written grammar books in Samogitian because it was traditionally considered to be a dialect of Lithuanian, but there were some attempts to standardise its written form. Among those who have tried are Stasys Anglickis, Pranas Genys, Sofija Kymantaitė-Čiurlionienė, B. Jurgutis, Juozas Pabrėža. Today, Samogitian has a standardised writing system but it still remains a spoken language.

== Differences from Standard Lithuanian ==
Samogitian differs from Standard Lithuanian in phonetics, lexicon, syntax and morphology.

Phonetic differences from standard Lithuanian are varied: each Samogitian dialect (West, North and South) has different reflexes.

Standard Lithuanian → Samogitian

- i → short ė, sometimes e;
- u → short o (in some cases u);
- ė → ie;
- o → uo;
- ie → ė̄, ėi, ī (y) (West, North and South);
- uo → ō, ou, ū (West, North and South);
- ai → ā;
- ei, iai → ē;
- ui → oi;
- oi (oj) → uo;
- an → on (an in south-east);
- un → on (un in south-east);
- ą → an in south-eastern, on in the central region and ō or ou in the north;
- ę → en in south-eastern, ėn in the central region and õ, ō or ėi in the north;
- ū → ū (in some cases un, um);
- ų in stressed endings → un and um;
- unstressed ų → o;
- y → ī (y), sometimes in;
- i from old ī → ī;
- u from old ō (Lithuanian uo) → ō, ou, ū (West, North and South)
- i from old ei (Lithuanian ie) → ė̄, ėi, ī (West, North and South)
- č → t (also č under Lithuanian influence);
- dž → d (also dž under Lithuanian influence);
- ia → ė (somewhere between i and e);
- io → ė (somewhere between i and e);
- unstressed ią → ė (somewhere between i and e);

The main difference between Samogitian and standard Lithuanian is verb conjugation. The past iterative tense is formed differently from Lithuanian (e.g., in Lithuanian the past iterative tense, meaning that action which was done in the past repeatedly, is made by removing the ending -ti and adding -davo (mirti – mirdavo, pūti – pūdavo), while in Samogitian, the word liuob is added instead before the word). The second verb conjugation merged with the first in Samogitian. The plural reflexive ending is -muos instead of expected -mies which is in Lithuanian (-mės). Samogitian preserved a lot of relics of athematic conjugation which did not survive in standard Lithuanian. The intonation in the future tense third person is the same as in the infinitive, in standard Lithuanian it shifts. The subjunctive conjugation is different from standard Lithuanian. Dual is preserved perfectly while in standard Lithuanian it has been completely lost.

The differences between nominals are considerable too. The fifth noun declension has almost completely merged with the third declension. The plural and some singular cases of the fourth declension have endings of the first declension (e.g.: singular nominative sūnos, plural nom. sūnā, in standard Lithuanian: sg. nom. sūnus, pl. nom. sūnūs). The neuter of adjectives has been pushed out by adverbs (except for šėlt 'warm', šalt 'cold', karšt 'hot') in Samogitian. Neuter pronouns were replaced by masculine. The second declension of adjectives has almost merged with the first declension, with only singular nominative case endings staying separate. The formation of pronominals is also different from standard Lithuanian.

== Other morphological differences ==
Samogitian also has many words and figures of speech that are altogether different from typically Lithuanian ones, e.g., kiuocis – basket (Lith. krepšys, Latvian ķocis), tevs – thin (Lith. plonas, tęvas, Latvian tievs), rebas – ribs (Lith. šonkauliai, Latvian ribas), a jebentas! – "can't be!" (Lith. negali būti!) and many more.

== Dialects ==
Map of the sub-dialects of the Lithuanian language (Zinkevičius and Girdenis, 1965). Western Samogitian sub-dialect Northern Samogitian : Sub-dialect of Kretinga Sub-dialect of Telšiai Southern Samogitian : Sub-dialect of Varniai Sub-dialect of Raseiniai

Samogitian is divided into three major dialects: Northern Samogitian (spoken in Telšiai and Kretinga regions), Western Samogitian (was spoken in the region around Klaipėda, now nearly extinct, – after 1945, many people were expelled and new ones came to this region) and Southern Samogitian (spoken in Varniai, Kelmė, Tauragė and Raseiniai regions). Historically, these are classified by their pronunciation of the Lithuanian word Duona, "bread". They are referred to as Dounininkai (from Douna), Donininkai (from Dona) and Dūnininkai (from Dūna).

== Political situation ==
The Samogitian language is rapidly declining: it is not used in the local school system and there is only one quarterly magazine and no television broadcasts in Samogitian. There are some radio broadcasts in Samogitian (in Klaipėda and Telšiai). Local newspapers and broadcast stations use standard Lithuanian instead. There is no new literature in Samogitian either, as authors prefer standard Lithuanian for its accessibility to a larger audience. Out of those people who speak Samogitian, only a few can understand its written form.

Migration of Samogitian speakers to other parts of the country and migration into Samogitia have reduced contact between Samogitian speakers, and therefore the level of fluency of those speakers.

There are attempts by the Samogitian Cultural Society to stem the loss of Samogitian. The council of Telšiai city put marks with Samogitian names for the city at the roads leading to the city, while the council of Skuodas claim to use the language during the sessions. A new system for writing Samogitian was created.

== Writing system ==
The first use of a unique writing system for Samogitian was in the interwar period, however it was neglected during the Soviet period, so only elderly people knew how to write in Samogitian at the time Lithuania regained independence. The Samogitian Cultural Society renewed the system to make it more usable.

The writing system uses similar letters to standard Lithuanian, but with the following differences:

- There are no nasal vowels (letters with ogoneks: ą, ę, į, ų).
- There are five additional long vowels, written with macrons above (as in Latvian): ā, ē, ė̄, ī, and ō. Lithuanian only has one letter with a macron: ū.
- Long i in Samogitian is written with a macron above: ī (unlike standard Lithuanian where it is y).
- The long vowel ė is written like ė with macron: Ė̄ and ė̄. In the pre-Unicode 8-bit computer fonts for Samogitian, the letter ė̄ was mapped on the code of the letter õ. This led to the common belief that ė̄ could be substituted with the character õ, but this is not the case. Instead, if the letter ė̄ is not available, it can be substituted with doubled ėė.
- There are two additional diphthongs in Samogitian that are written as digraphs: ou and ėi. (The component letters are part of the standard Lithuanian alphabet.)

As previously it was difficult to add these new characters to typesets, some older Samogitian texts use double letters instead of macrons to indicate long vowels, for example aa for ā and ee for ē; now the Samogitian Cultural Society discourages these conventions and recommends using the letters with macrons above instead. The use of double letters is accepted in cases where computer fonts do not have Samogitian letters; in such cases y is used instead of Samogitian ī, the same as in standard Lithuanian, while other long letters are written as double letters. The apostrophe might be used to denote palatalization in some cases; in others i is used for this, as in standard Lithuanian.

A Samogitian computer keyboard layout has been created.

Samogitian alphabet:

Letter; Name	A a [ā]	Ā ā [ėlguojė ā]	B b [bė]	C c [cė]	Č č [čė]	D d [dė]	E e [ē]	Ē ē [ėlguojė ē]
Letter; Name	Ė ė [ė̄]	Ė̄ ė̄ [ėlguojė ė̄]	F f [ėf]	G g [gė, gie]	H h [hā]	I i [ī]	Ī ī [ėlguojė ī]	J j [jot]
Letter; Name	K k [kā]	L l [ėl]	M m [ėm]	N n [ėn]	O o [ō]	Ō ō [ėlguojė ō]	P p [pė]	R r [ėr]
Letter; Name	S s [ės]	Š š [ėš]	T t [tė]	U u [ū]	Ū ū [ėlguojė ū]	V v [vė]	Z z [zė, zet]	Ž ž [žė, žet].

== Samples ==
English	Samogitian	Lithuanian	Latvian	Latgalian
Samogitian	žemaitiu ruoda	žemaičių tarmė	žemaišu valoda	žemaišu volūda
English	onglu kalba	anglų kalba	angļu valoda	ongļu volūda
Yes	Je, Noje, Tēp	Taip	Jā	Nuj
No	Ne	Ne	Nē	Nā
Hello!	Svēks	Sveikas	Sveiks	Vasals
How are you?	Kāp gīvenė?	Kaip gyveni / laikaisi / einasi?	Kā tev iet?	Kai īt?
Good evening!	Lab vakar!	Labas vakaras!	Labvakar!	Lobs vokors!
Welcome [to...]	Svēkė atvīkė̄!	Sveiki atvykę	Laipni lūdzam	Vasali atguojuši
Good night!	Labanakt	Labos nakties / Labanakt!	Ar labu nakti	Lobys nakts!
Goodbye!	Sudieu, vėsa gera	Viso gero / Sudie(vu) / Viso labo!	Visu labu	Palicyt vasali
Have a nice day!	Geruos dėinuos!	Geros dienos / Labos dienos!	Jauku dienu!	Breineigu dīnu
Good luck!	Siekmies!	Sėkmės!	Veiksmi!	Lai lūbsīs!
Please	Prašau	Prašau	Lūdzu	Lyudzams
Thank you	Diekou	Ačiū / Dėkui / Dėkoju	Paldies	Paļdis
You're welcome	Prašuom	Prašom	Lūdzu!	Lyudzu!
I'm sorry	Atsėprašau	Atsiprašau / Atleiskite	Atvaino (Piedod)	Atlaid
Who?	Kas?	Kas?	Kas? (Kurš?)	Kas?
When?	Kumet?	Kada / Kuomet?	Kad?	Kod?
Where?	Kor?	Kur?	Kur?	Kur?
Why?	Kudie / Dikuo?	Kodėl / Dėl ko?	Kādēļ? (Kāpēc?)	Dieļ kuo?
What's your name?	Kuoks tava vards?	Koks tavo vardas? / Kuo tu vardu?	Kāds ir tavs vārds? (Kā tevi sauc?)	Kai tevi sauc?
Because	Tudie / Dituo	Todėl / Dėl to	Tādēļ (Tāpēc)	Dieļ tuo
How?	Kāp?	Kaip?	Kā?	Kai?
How much?	Kėik?	Kiek?	Cik daudz?	Cik daudzi?
I do not understand.	Nesopronto/Nasopronto	Nesuprantu	Nesaprotu	Nasaprūtu
I understand.	Soprontu	Suprantu	Saprotu	Saprūtu
Help me!	Ratavuokėt!	Padėkite / Gelbėkite!	Palīgā!	Paleigā!
Where is the toilet?	Kor īr tolets?	Kur yra tualetas?	Kur ir tualete?	Kur irā tualets?
Do you speak English?	Rokounateis onglėškā?	(Ar) kalbate angliškai?	Vai runājat angliski?	Runuojit ongliski?
I don't speak Samogitian.	Nerokoujous žemaitėškā.	Žemaitiškai nekalbu	Es nerunāju žemaitiski	As narunuoju žemaitiski
The check, please. (In restaurant)	Sāskaita prašītiuo	Prašyčiau sąskaitą / Sąskaitą, prašyčiau / Sąskaitą, prašau, pateikite	Rēķinu, lūdzu!	Lyudzu, saskaitu
