= Skalvians =

Western Baltic tribe

The Skalvians in the context of the other Baltic tribes, c. 1200 CE. The Eastern Balts are shown in brown hues while the Western Balts are shown in green. The boundaries are approximate.

The Scalovians (Lithuanian: Skalviai; German: Schalauer), also known as the Skalvians, Schalwen and Schalmen, were a Baltic tribe related to the Prussians. According to the Chronicon terrae Prussiae of Peter of Dusburg, the now extinct Scalovians inhabited the land of Scalovia south of the Curonians and Samogitians, by the lower Neman River ca. 1240.

== Geography ==
This region is located at both sides of the river Memel north of Nadruvians and south of Samogitia. In the North-East it stretched to rivers Šešupė, Ežeruona and Jūra. In the East it bordered on Sudovia, in the North-West on river Minija, in the West on the Curonian Lagoon and in the South-West on river Gilija. The center were the towns of Rusnė, Ragainė and Tilžė.

== Name ==
The meaning is uncertain: skalwa "splinter (living split off)" or skalauti "between waters". According to Prussian legends, the tribe's name is derived from one of the sons of King Widewuto named Schalauo.

== Language ==
Skalvian
- Scalovian
- Region: Lithuania and Kaliningrad
- Ethnicity: Skalvians
- Era: 13th century
- Language family: Indo-European: Balto-Slavic; West Baltic ?; Skalvian

Language codes
- ISO 639-3: svx
- Glottolog: None
- Former extent of West Baltic languages, including Skalvian. Old Curonian † Old Prussian Sudovian † Skalvian † West Galindian †

Skalvian, or Scalovian, is the presumed West Baltic language or dialect of the Skalvians. It could also haven been a transitional language between Eastern and Western Baltic languages.

== Literature ==
- Balys, Jonas: Grundzüge der Kleinlitauischen Volksdichtung, in Tolkemita-Texte “Lieder aus Schalauen” Nr.53, Dieburg 1997
- Eckert, Rainer/ Bukevičiute, Elvire-Julia/ Hinze, Friedhelm: Die baltischen Sprachen, eine Einführung, Langenscheidt 1994, 5. Auflage 1998
- Lepa, Gerhard (Hrsg): Die Schalauer, Die Stämme der Prußen, Tolkemita-Texte 52, Dieburg 1997
- Matulaitis, K.A.: Die Schalauer des Altertums, Tauto praeitis II, 2, 1965, in Tolkemita Texte, Dieburg 1997
- Salemke, Gerhard: Lagepläne der Wallburganlagen von der ehemaligen Provinz Ostpreußen, Gütersloh, 2005
- Salys, Anatanas: Schalauen, Lietuviu Enciklopedija, 1962, Boston, Band 27, S. 536–541, aus dem Litauischen in Tolkemita-Texte 52, Dieburg 1997
- Salys, Anton: Die zemaitischen Mundarten, Teil 1: Geschichte des zemaitischen Sprachgebiets Tauta ir Zodis, Bd-VI Kaunas 1930 (= Diss. Leipzig 1930)
- Tettau, v.: Volkssagen Ostpreußens, Litthauens und Westpreußens, Berlin 1837, S.10
- Trautmann, Reinhold: Über die sprachliche Stellung der Schalwen. Streitberg Festgabe Leipzig 1924, S.355 ff
