= Curonian =

Curonian may refer to:

- Curonian language
- Curonians, or Kurs, a Baltic tribe in present-day western Latvia and Lithuania
- from Curonia, Latin for Courland

== See also ==
- Curonian Lagoon
- Curonian Spit / Courish Spit
