= Vytautas Mažiulis =

Vytautas Juozapas Mažiulis (August 20, 1926 in Rokėnai – April 11, 2009 in Vilnius) was a Lithuanian Balticist, an expert on the Old Prussian language and Indo-European languages.

== Biography ==
Mažiulis studied classical philology at the Vilnius University in 1947–1952, receiving his Ph.D. in 1956 at the Lomonosov Moscow State University with his thesis on Lithuanian numerals. In 1955 he started working at the Vilnius University, holding a Chair of Lithuanian Language in 1968–1973.

With Jonas Kazlauskas he founded the international journal for Baltic philology Baltistica in 1965 and the Chair for Baltic philology in 1973 after the murder of professor Kazlauskas.

In 1970 he became the member of the Lithuanian Academy of Sciences, after publishing his monograph on the relationship between Baltic and other Indo-European languages.

Vytautas Mažiulis was also correspondent member of both the Mainz Academy of Sciences and Literature (Germany) and the Milanese Linguistics Society (Italy), as well as Chairman of an International Commission on Baltic-Slavonic Relations.

== Works ==
- Relations of Baltic and other Indoeuropean languages (Vilnius, 1970)
- Prūsų kalbos paminklai ("Monuments of the Prussian Language" Vilnius, t. I 1966, t. II 1981, Vilnius)
- Prūsų kalbos etimologijos žodynas ("Etymological dictionary of Prussian", 4 volumes, 1988-1997, Vilnius)
- Prūsų kalbos istorinė gramatika ("Historical Grammar of Prussian", Vilnius, 2004)
- On the Diachronic Morphology of the Slavonic and Baltic Languages (in collaboration with V. Zhuraviev, 1978, in Russian)
