= Old Prussian language =

Extinct and revived Western Baltic language

Old Prussian
- Prūsiskai; Prūsiska bilā (revived)
- Region: Prussia
- Ethnicity: Baltic Prussians
- Extinct: early 18th century
- Revival: 3 L1 speakers (2021); 50 L2 speakers (no date)
- Language family: Indo-European: Balto-Slavic; Baltic; West Baltic; Old Prussian
- Dialects: Samland; Pomesan
- Writing system: Latin

Language codes
- ISO 639-3: prg
- Glottolog: prus1238
- Linguasphere: 54-AAC-a

Old Prussian was a West Baltic language belonging to the Baltic branch of the Indo-European languages, which was once spoken by the Old Prussians, the Baltic peoples of the Prussian region. The language is called Old Prussian to avoid confusion with the German dialects of Low Prussian and High Prussian and with the adjective Prussian as it relates to the later German state. Old Prussian began to be written down in the Latin alphabet in about the 13th century, and a small amount of literature in the language survives. As of 2021, there has been a revival movement of Old Prussian, and there are families which use Old Prussian as their first language.

== Classification ==
Old Prussian is an Indo-European language belonging to the Baltic branch. It is considered to be a Western Baltic language.

Old Prussian was closely related to the other extinct West Baltic languages, namely Sudovian, West Galindian and possibly Skalvian and Old Curonian. Other linguists consider Western Galindian and Skalvian to be Prussian dialects.

It is related to the East Baltic languages such as Lithuanian and Latvian, and more distantly related to Slavic. Compare the words for 'land': Old Prussian: semmē [zemē], Latvian: zeme, Lithuanian: žemė, Russian: земля́, (zemljá) and Polish: ziemia.

Old Prussian had loanwords from Slavic languages (e.g., Old Prussian curtis [kurtis] 'hound', like Lithuanian kùrtas and Latvian kur̃ts, cognate with Slavic (compare Ukrainian: хорт, khort; Polish: chart; Czech: chrt)), as well as a few borrowings from Germanic, including from Gothic (e.g., Old Prussian ylo 'awl' as with Lithuanian ýla, Latvian īlens) and from Scandinavian languages.

== Influence on other languages ==
=== Germanic ===
The Low German language spoken in Prussia (or West Prussia and East Prussia), called Low Prussian (cf. High Prussian, High German), preserved a number of Baltic Prussian words, such as Kurp, from the Old Prussian kurpe, for shoe in contrast to common Low German: Schoh (Standard German Schuh), as did the High Prussian Oberland subdialect.

Until the 1938 changing of place names in East Prussia, Old Prussian river- and place-names, such as Tawe and Tawellningken, could still be found.

=== Polish ===
One of the hypotheses regarding the origin of mazurzenie – a phonological merger of dentialveolar and postalveolar sibilants in many Polish dialects – states that it originated as a feature of Polonized Old Prussians in Masuria (see Masurian dialects) and spread from there.

== History ==
=== Original territory ===
The approximate distribution of the Baltic tribes, c. 1200 CE

In addition to Prussia proper, the original territory of the Old Prussians may have included eastern parts of Pomerelia (some parts of the region east of the Vistula River). The language may also have been spoken much further east and south in what became Polesia and part of Podlasie, before conquests by Rus and Poles starting in the 10th century and the German colonisation of the area starting in the 12th century.

=== Decline ===
With the conquest of the Old Prussian territory by the Teutonic Knights in the 13th century, and the subsequent influx of Polish, Lithuanian and especially German speakers, Old Prussian experienced a 400-year-long decline as an "oppressed language of an oppressed population". Groups of people from Germany, Poland, Lithuania, Scotland, England, and Austria (see Salzburg Protestants) found refuge in Prussia during the Protestant Reformation and thereafter. Old Prussian ceased to be spoken probably around the beginning of the 18th century, because many of its remaining speakers died in the famines and the bubonic plague outbreak which harrowed the East Prussian countryside and towns from 1709 until 1711.

=== Revitalization ===
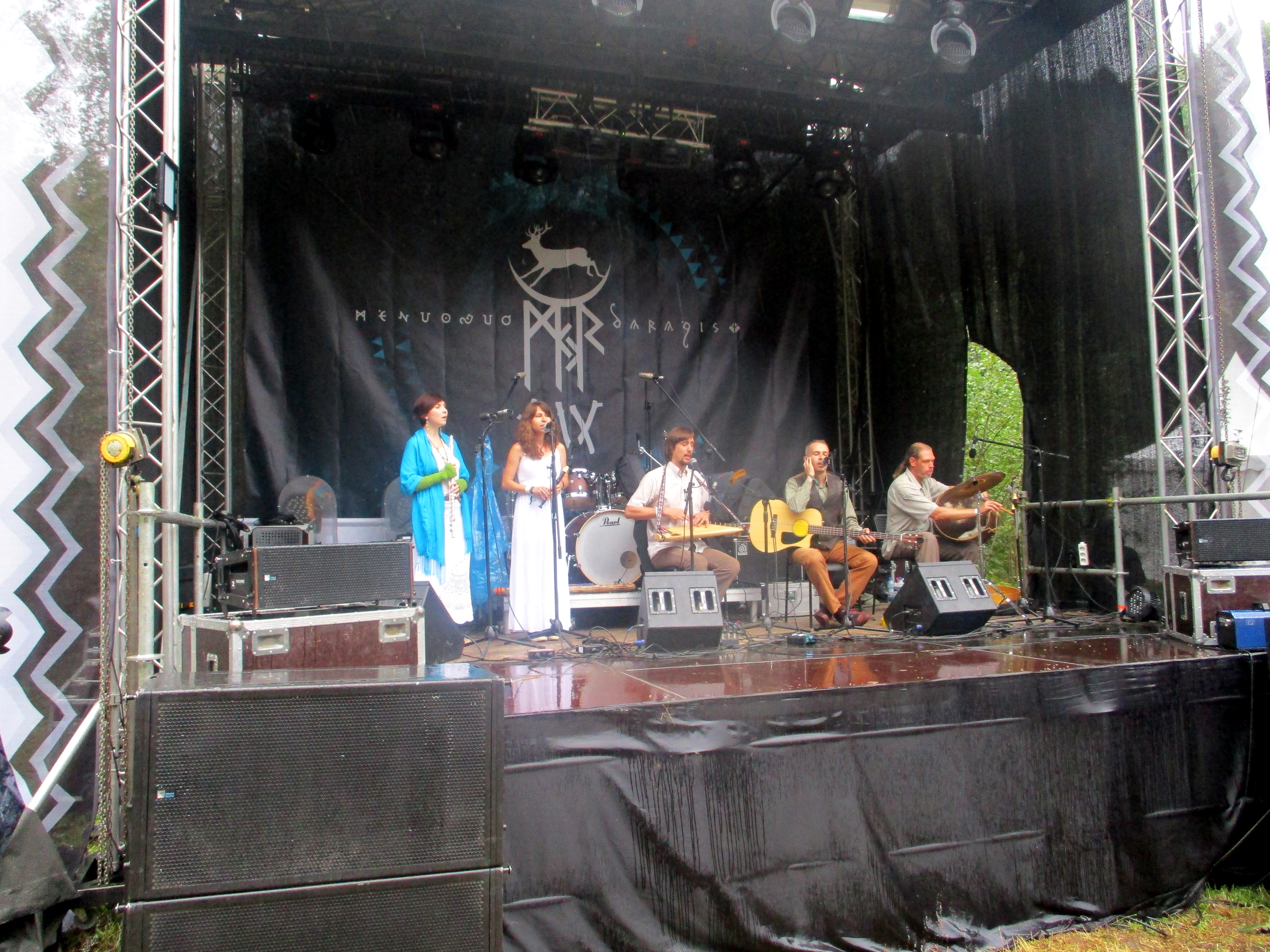
The Prussian post-folk band Kellan performing at the Baltic culture festival Mėnuo Juodaragis in Lithuania

In the 1980s, the linguists Vladimir Toporov and Vytautas Mažiulis started reconstructing the Prussian language as a scientific project and a humanitarian gesture. Some enthusiasts thereafter began to revive the language based on their reconstruction.

Most current speakers live in Germany, Poland, Lithuania and Kaliningrad (Russia). Additionally, a few children are native in Revived Prussian.

Today, there are websites, online dictionaries, learning apps and games for Revived Prussian, and one children's book – Antoine de Saint-Exupéry's The Little Prince – was translated into Revived Prussian by Piotr Szatkowski (Pīteris Šātkis) and published by the Prusaspirā Society in 2015. Moreover, some bands use Revived Prussian, most notably in the Kaliningrad Oblast by the bands Romowe Rikoito, Kellan and Āustras Laīwan, as well as in Lithuania by Kūlgrinda on their 2005 album Prūsų Giesmės ('Prussian Hymns'), and Latvia by Rasa Ensemble in 1988 and Valdis Muktupāvels in his 2005 oratorio "Pārcēlātājs Pontifex" featuring several parts sung in Prussian.

== Dialects ==
The Elbing Vocabulary and the Catechisms display systematical differences in phonology, vocabulary and grammar. Some scholars postulate that this is due to them being recordings of different dialects: Pomesanian and Sambian.

Phonetical distinctions are: Pom. ē is Samb. ī (sweta- : swīta- 'world'); Pom. ō, Samb. ū after a labial (mōthe [mōte] : mūti 'mother') or Pom. ō, Samb. ā (tōwis : tāws 'father'; brōte : brāti 'brother'), which influences the nominative suffixes of feminine ā-stems (crauyō [kraujō] : krawia 'blood'). The nominative suffixes of the masculine o-stems are weakened to -is in Pomesanian; in Sambian they are syncopated (deywis : deiws 'god').

Vocabulary differences encompass Pom. smoy [zmoy] (cf. Lith. žmuo), Samb. wijrs 'man'; Pom. wayklis, Samb. soūns 'son' and Pom. samien, Samb. laucks [lauks] 'field'. The neuter gender is more often found in Pomesianan than in Sambian.

Others argue that the Catechisms are written in a Yatvingized Prussian. The differences noted above could therefore be explained as being features of a different West Baltic language Yatvingian/Sudovian.

== Phonology ==
=== Consonants ===
The Prussian language is described as having the following consonants:

		Labial		Dental/ Alveolar		Post- alveolar		Velar		Glottal
		plain	pal.	plain	pal.	plain	pal.	plain	pal.	Glottal
Plosive	voiceless	p	pʲ	t	tʲ			k	kʲ	
Plosive	voiced	b	bʲ	d	dʲ			ɡ	ɡʲ	
Fricative	voiceless	f (Note: The sounds /f/ and /h/ also existed in Old Prussian, but are disputed as to whether they are native to the language as they are non-native to Lithuanian and Latvian.)		s	sʲ	ʃ (Note: Palato-alveolar fricatives [ʃ, ʒ] are recorded as well, usually with the German orthography-style ⟨sch⟩. They were allophones of /s/ or /z/ in Pomesanian, but distinct phonemes in Sambian.)	ʃʲ			h
Fricative	voiced	v	vʲ	z	zʲ	ʒ	ʒʲ			
Nasal		m	mʲ	n	nʲ					
Trill				r	rʲ					
Approximant				l	lʲ	j				

There is said to have existed palatalization (i.e. [tʲ], [dʲ]) among nearly all of the consonant sounds except for /j/, and possibly for /ʃ/ and /ʒ/. Whether or not the palatalization was phonemic remains unclear.

Apart from the palatalizations Proto-Baltic consonants were almost completely preserved. The only changes postulated are turning Proto-Baltic /ʃ, ʒ/ into Prussian /s, z/ and subsequently changing Proto-Baltic /sj/ into /ʃ/.

=== Vowels ===
The following description is based on the phonological analysis by Schmalstieg:

	Front		Central		Back	
	short	long	short	long	short	long
High	i	iː			u	uː
Mid	e	eː				oː
Low			a	aː		

- /a, aː/ could also have been realized as [ɔ, ɔː]
- /oː/ is not universally accepted, p.e. by Levin (1975)

==== Diphthongs ====
Schmalstieg proposes three native diphthongs:

	Front	Back
Mid	ei	
Open	ai	au

- /au/ may have also been realized as a mid-back diphthong [eu] after palatalized consonants.
- /ui/ occurs in the word cuylis, which is thought to be a loanword.

== Grammar ==
With other remains being merely word lists, the grammar of Old Prussian is reconstructed chiefly on the basis of the three Catechisms.

=== Nouns ===
==== Gender ====
Old Prussian preserved the Proto-Baltic neuter. Therefore, it had three genders (masculine, feminine, neuter).

==== Number ====
Most scholars agree that there are two numbers, singular and plural, in Old Prussian, while some consider remnants of dual number identifiable in the existent corpus.

==== Cases ====
There is no consensus on the number of cases that Old Prussian had, and at least four can be determined with certainty: nominative, genitive, accusative and dative, with different suffixes. Most scholars agree, that there are traces of a vocative case, such as in the phrase O Deiwe Rikijs 'O God the Lord', reflecting the inherited PIE vocative ending *-e, differing from nominative forms in o-stem nouns only.

Some scholars find instrumental forms, while the traditional view is that no instrumental case existed in Old Prussian. There could be some locative forms, e.g. bītai ('in the evening').

==== Noun stems ====
Declensional classes were a-stems (also called o-stems), (i)ja-stems (also called (i)jo-stems), ā-stems (feminine), ē-stems (feminine), i-stems, u-stems, and consonant-stems. Some also list ī/jā-stems as a separate stem, while others include jā-stems into ā-stems and do not mention ī-stems at all.

=== Adjectives ===
There were three adjective stems (a-stems, i-stems, u-stems), of which only the first agreed with the noun in gender.

There was a comparative and a superlative form.

=== Verbal morphology ===
When it comes to verbal morphology present, future and past tense are attested, as well as optative forms (used with imperative or permissive forms of verbs), infinitive, and four participles (active/passive present/past).

== Orthography ==
The orthography varies depending on the author. As the authors of many sources were themselves not proficient in Old Prussian, they wrote the words as they heard them using the orthographical conventions of their mother tongue. For example, the use of ⟨s⟩ for both /s/ and /z/ is based on German orthography. Additionally, the writers misunderstood some phonemes and, when copying manuscripts, they added further mistakes.

== Corpus of Old Prussian ==
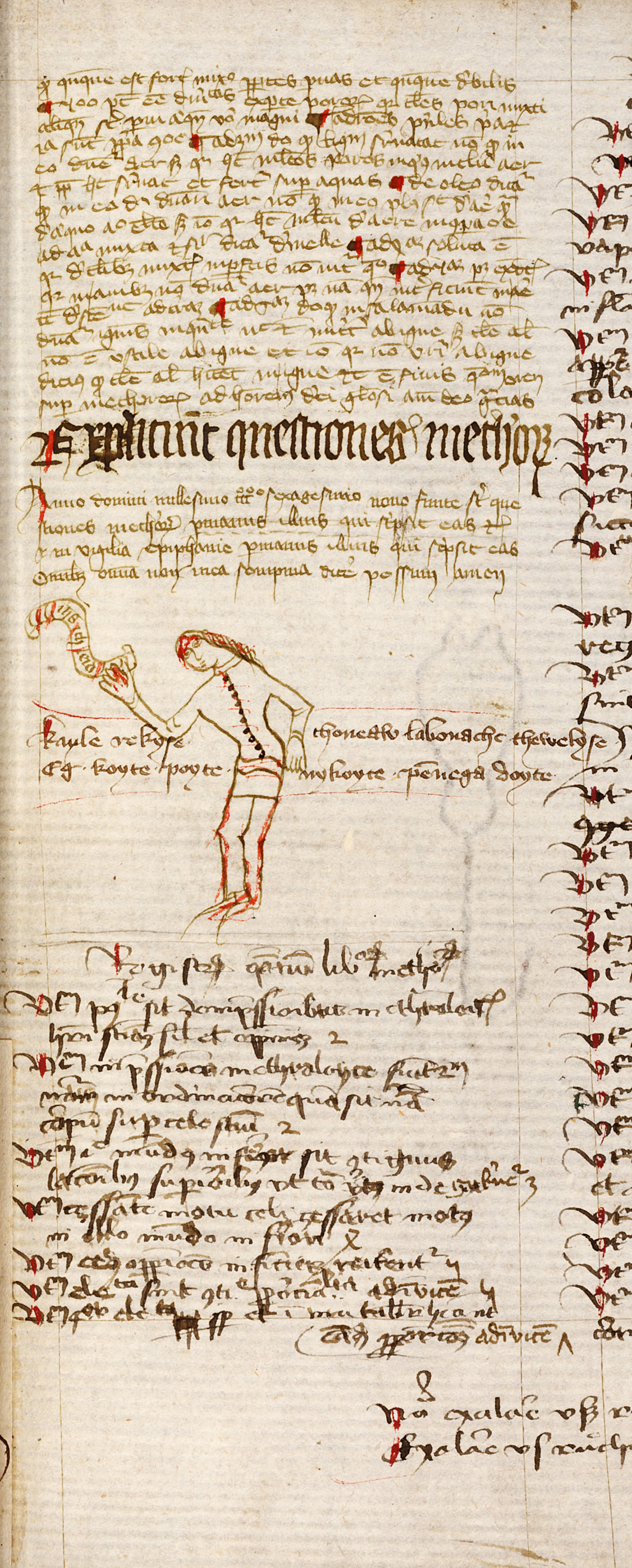
The epigram of Basel – oldest known inscription in Prussian language and Baltic language in general, middle of 14th century

=== Onomastics ===
There was Prussian toponomy and hydronomy within the territory of (Baltic) Prussia. Georg Gerullis undertook the first basic study of these names in Die altpreußischen Ortsnamen ('The Old Prussian Place-names'), written and published with the help of Walter de Gruyter, in 1922.

Another source are personal names.

=== Evidence from other languages ===
Further sources for Prussian words are Vernacularisms in the German dialects of East and West Prussia, as well as words of Old Curonian origin in Latvian and West-Baltic vernacularisms in Lithuanian and Belarusian.

=== Vocabularies ===
Two Prussian vocabularies are known. The older one by Simon Grunau (Simon Grunovius), a historian of the Teutonic Knights, encompasses 100 words (in strongly varying versions). He also recorded an expression: sta nossen rickie, nossen rickie ('This (is) our lord, our lord'). The vocabulary is part of the Preussische Chronik written c. 1517–1526.

The second one is the so-called Elbing Vocabulary, which consists of 802 thematically sorted words and their German equivalents. Peter Holcwesscher from Marienburg copied the manuscript around 1400; the original dates from the beginning of the 14th or the end of the 13th century. It was found in 1825 by Fr Neumann among other manuscripts acquired by him from the heritage of the Elbing merchant A. Grübnau; it was thus dubbed the Codex Neumannianus.

=== Fragmentary texts ===
There are separate words found in various historical documents.

The following fragments are commonly thought of as Prussian, but are probably actually Lithuanian (at least the adage, however, has been argued to be genuinely West Baltic, only an otherwise unattested dialect):

1. An adage of 1583, Dewes does dantes, Dewes does geitka: the form does in the second instance corresponds to Lithuanian future tense duos ('will give')
2. Trencke, trencke! ('Strike! Strike!')

==== Fragmentary Lord's Prayer ====
Additionally, there is one manuscript fragment of the first words of the Pater Noster in Prussian, from the beginning of the 15th century:

Towe Nüsze kås esse andangonsün
swyntins

==== Maletius' Sudovian Book ====
Vytautas Mažiulis lists another few fragmentary texts recorded in several versions by Hieronymus Maletius in the Sudovian Book in the middle of the 16th century. Palmaitis regards them as Sudovian proper.

1. Beigeite beygeyte peckolle ('Run, run, devils!')
2. Kails naussen gnigethe ('Hello our friend!')
3. Kails poskails ains par antres – a drinking toast, reconstructed as Kaīls pas kaīls, aīns per āntran ('A cheer for a cheer, a tit for tat', literally: 'A healthy one after a healthy one, one after another!')
4. Kellewesze perioth, Kellewesze perioth ('A carter drives here, a carter drives here!')
5. Ocho moy myle schwante panicke – also recorded as O hoho Moi mile swente Pannike, O ho hu Mey mile swenthe paniko, O mues miles schwante Panick ('Oh my dear holy fire!')

=== Complete texts ===
In addition to the texts listed beneath, there are several colophons written by Prussian scriptors who worked in Prague and in the court of Lithuanian duke Butautas Kęstutaitis.

==== Basel Epigram ====
The so-called Basel Epigram is the oldest written Prussian sentence (1369). It reads:

Kayle rekyse
thoneaw labonache thewelyse
Eg koyte poyte
nykoyte pênega doyte

Translation:

Cheers, Sir!
You are no longer a good little comrade
if you want to drink
(but) do not want to give a penny!

This jocular inscription was most probably made by a Prussian student studying in Prague (Charles University); found by Stephen McCluskey (1974) in manuscript MS F.V.2 (book of physics Questiones super Meteororum by Nicholas Oresme), fol. 63r, stored in the Basel University library.

==== Catechisms ====
The longest texts preserved in Old Prussian are three Catechisms printed in Königsberg. The first two, both from 1545, consist of only six pages of text in Old Prussian – the second one being a correction of the first. The third catechism, from 1561, or Enchiridion, consists of 132 pages of text, and is a translation of Luther's Small Catechism by a German cleric called Abel Will, with his Prussian assistant Paul Megott. Will himself knew little or no Old Prussian, and his Prussian interpreter was probably illiterate, but according to Will spoke Old Prussian quite well. The text itself is mainly a word-for-word translation, and Will phonetically recorded Megott's oral translation. Because of this, the Enchiridion exhibits many irregularities, such as the lack of case agreement in phrases involving an article and a noun, which followed word-for-word German originals as opposed to native Old Prussian syntax.

==== Trace of Crete ====
The "Trace of Crete" is a short poem added by a Baltic writer in Chania to a manuscript of the Logica Parva by Paul of Venice.

Atonaige maian meilan am ne wede maianwargan
Thaure ne ſtonais po pieſ pievſſenabdolenai galei ragai
Stonais po leipen zaidiant acha peda bete medde

Translation:

Stand under the May tree willingly/dear – the May tree does not bring you to misery
Aurochs, do not stand under the pine tree – horns bring death,
Stand under the blooming linden tree – the bee brings honey here.

== Sample texts ==
Lord's Prayer in Old Prussian (from the so-called "1st Catechism")

Thawe nuson kas tu asse andangon.
Swintits wirst twais emmens.
Pergeis twais laeims.
Twais quaits audasseisin na semmey, key audangon.
Nusan deininan geittin deis numons schindeinan.
Bha atwerpeis numans nuson auschantins, kay mas atwerpimay nuson auschautenikamans.
Bha ny wedais mans enperbandan.
Sclait is rankeis mans assa wargan. Amen

Lord's Prayer after Simon Grunau (Curonian)

Nossen thewes cur tu es delbes
sweytz gischer tho wes wardes
penag munis tholbe mystlastilbi
tolpes prahes girkade delbeszisne tade symmes semmes worsunii
dodi mommys an nosse igdemas mayse
unde gaytkas pames mumys nusze noszeginu cademes pametam musen prettane kans
newede munis lawnā padomā
swalbadi munis nowusse loyne Jhesus amen.

Lord's Prayer after Prätorius (Curonian) (Note: Adelung simply says "der Prätorius". This is most likely Matthäus Prätorius; because two pages earlier Adelung refers with approval to the writings of both Hartknoch and Prätorius, and Christoph Hartknoch worked with Matthäus Prätorius.)

Thewes nossen, cur tu es Debbes,
Schwisch gesger thowes Wardes;
Pena mynis thowe Wiswalstybe;
Toppes Patres gir iat Delbeszisne, tade tymnes senjnes Worsinny;
Annosse igdenas Mayse dodi mums szon Dien;
Pamutale mums musu Noschegun, kademas pametan nousson Pyktainekans;
No wede numus panam Paadomam;
Swalbadi names ne wust Tayne.

Lord's Prayer in Lithuanian dialect of Insterburg (Prediger Hennig)

Tewe musu, kurs essi Danguje,
Buk szwenczamas Wardas tawo,
Ateik tawo Karalijste;
Buk tawo Walle kaip Danguje, taip ir an Zemes;
Duna musu dieniszka duk mums ir sze Diena;
Atleisk mums musu Kaltes, kaip mes atoeidzjam sawo Kaltiems;
Ne wesk mus Pagundima;
Bet gelbek mus nu Pikto.

Lord's Prayer in Lithuanian dialect of Nadruvia, corrupted (Simon Praetorius)

Tiewe musu, kursa tu essi Debsissa,
Szwints tiest taws Wards;
Akeik mums twa Walstybe;
Tawas Praats buk kaip Debbesissa taibant wirszu Sjemes;
Musu dieniszka May e duk mums ir szen Dienan;
Atmesk mums musu Griekus, kaip mes pammetam musi Pardokonteimus;
Ne te wedde mus Baidykle;
Bet te passarge mus mi wissa Louna (Pikta)

== See also ==
- High Prussian dialect
- Low Prussian dialect
- Masurian dialects

== Literature ==
- Johann Christoph Adelung, Johann Severin Vater: Mithridates oder allgemeine Sprachenkunde mit dem Vater Unser als Sprachprobe in beynahe fünfhundert Sprachen und Mundarten, vol. 2, Berlin 1809, p. 700ff. ()
- Johann Severin Vater: Die Sprache der alten Preußen: Einleitung, Ueberreste, Sprachlehre, Wörterbuch, Braunschweig 1821
- G. H. F. Nesselmann, Forschungen auf dem Gebiete der preußischen Sprache, 2. Beitrag: Königsberg, 1871.
- G. H. F. Nesselmann, Thesaurus linguae Prussicae, Berlin, 1873.
- E. Berneker, Die preussische Sprache, Strassburg, 1896 ().
- R. Trautmann, Die altpreussischen Sprachdenkmäler, Göttingen, 1910.
- Wijk, Nicolaas van, Altpreussiche Studien : Beiträge zur baltischen und zur vergleichenden indogermanischen Grammatik, Haag, 1918.
- G. Gerullis, Die altpreussischen Ortsnamen, Berlin-Leipzig, 1922.
- R. Trautmann, Die altpreussischen Personnennamen, Göttingen, 1925.
- G. Gerullis, Zur Sprache der Sudauer-Jadwinger, in Festschrift A. Bezzenberger, Göttingen 1927
- W. R. Schmalstieg, An Old Prussian Grammar, University Park and London, 1974.
- W. R. Schmalstieg, Studies in Old Prussian, University Park and London, 1976.
- V. Toporov, Prusskij jazyk: Slovar', A – L, Moskva, 1975–1990 (not finished).
- L. Kilian: Zu Herkunft und Sprache der Prußen Wörterbuch Deutsch–Prußisch, Bonn 1980
- (In Lithuanian) V. Mažiulis, Prūsų kalbos paminklai, Vilnius, t. I 1966, t. II 1981.
- J. Endzelīns, Senprūšu valoda. – Gr. Darbu izlase, IV sēj., 2. daļa, Rīga, 1982. 9.-351. lpp.
- V. Mažiulis, Prūsų kalbos etimologijos žodynas, Vilnius, t. I-IV, 1988–1997.
- M. Biolik, Zuflüsse zur Ostsee zwischen unterer Weichsel und Pregel, Stuttgart, 1989.
- R. Przybytek, Ortsnamen baltischer Herkunft im südlichen Teil Ostpreussens, Stuttgart, 1993.
- R. Przybytek, Hydronymia Europaea, Ortsnamen baltischer Herkunft im südlichen Teil Ostpreußens, Stuttgart 1993
- M. Biolik, Die Namen der stehenden Gewässer im Zuflussgebiet des Pregel, Stuttgart, 1993.
- M. Biolik, Die Namen der fließenden Gewässer im Flussgebiet des Pregel, Stuttgart, 1996.
- G. Blažienė, Die baltischen Ortsnamen in Samland, Stuttgart, 2000.
- A. Kaukienė, Prūsų kalba, Klaipėda, 2002.
- V. Mažiulis, Prūsų kalbos istorinė gramatika, Vilnius, 2004.
- LEXICON BORVSSICVM VETVS. Concordantia et lexicon inversum. / Bibliotheca Klossiana I, Universitas Vytauti Magni, Kaunas, 2007.
- OLD PRUSSIAN WRITTEN MONUMENTS. Facsimile, Transliteration, Reconstruction, Comments. / Bibliotheca Klossiana II, Universitas Vytauti Magni / Lithuanians' World Center, Kaunas, 2007.
- (In Lithuanian) V. Rinkevičius, Prūsistikos pagrindai (Fundamentals of Prussistics). 2015.
