= Reinhold Trautmann =

German Slavicist (1883–1951)

- Born: 16 January 1883; Königsberg, Kingdom of Prussia (now Kaliningrad, Russia)
- Died: 4 October 1951 (aged 68); Jena, East Germany

Academic work
- Institutions: Charles University; University of Königsberg; Leipzig University; University of Jena
- Main interests: Slavic studies

Reinhold Trautmann (16 January 1883 – 4 October 1951) was a German Slavist. He is best known for his translations of the works of Slavic literature, such as his 1931 translation of the Primary Chronicle into German. He also conducted research of Slavic languages spoken in Germany.

== Biography ==
He was born in Königsberg. Since 1910 he worked at the Universities in Prague, Königsberg, Leipzig and (since 1948) Jena. He became known for his work on Balto-Slavic philology and Slavic folk poetry. In 1928-1931 he was a member of the German Democratic Party (since 1930 German State Party).

In November 1933 he was one of the signatories of the Commitment of the German professors to Adolf Hitler. In 1937 he became a member of the Nazi Party. In 1939 his treatise Die wendischen Ortsnamen Ostholsteins, Lübecks, Lauenburgs und Mecklenburgs ("The Slavic place names of East Holstein, Lübeck, Lauenburg and Mecklenburg") was banned for political reasons. From 1940 until his death he was a member of the Saxonian Academy of Sciences and Humanities in Leipzig.

After 1945 he supported the cultural orientation of the Soviet occupation zone and the East Germany towards the Soviet Union.

== Works ==
- Die altpreußischen Sprachdenkmäler, 1910
- Baltisch-slavisches Wörterbuch, Göttingen, 1923
- Slawisch-baltische Quellen und Forschungen, 1927
- Wesen und Aufgaben der deutschen Slawistik, 1927 (with H. Schmid)
- Die Altrussische Nestorchronik in Übersetzung herausgegeben, Markert & Peters, Leipzig 1931
- Die slawischen Völker und Sprachen, Leipzig 1948
- Die elb- und ostseeslawischen Ortsnamen, Berlin 1948–56
