= Dnieper-Oka language =

Extinct Baltic language group

Dnieper-Oka
- Dnieper-Baltic, Eastern Peripheral Baltic
- Geographic distribution: In the northeast of Central Europe, western parts of Baltic region
- Ethnicity: Dnieper Balts
- Extinct: 12th century AD
- Linguistic classification: Indo-European: Balto-Slavic; Baltic; Dnieper-Oka
- Subdivisions: Golyad †

Language codes
- ISO 639-3: None (mis)
- Glottolog: None
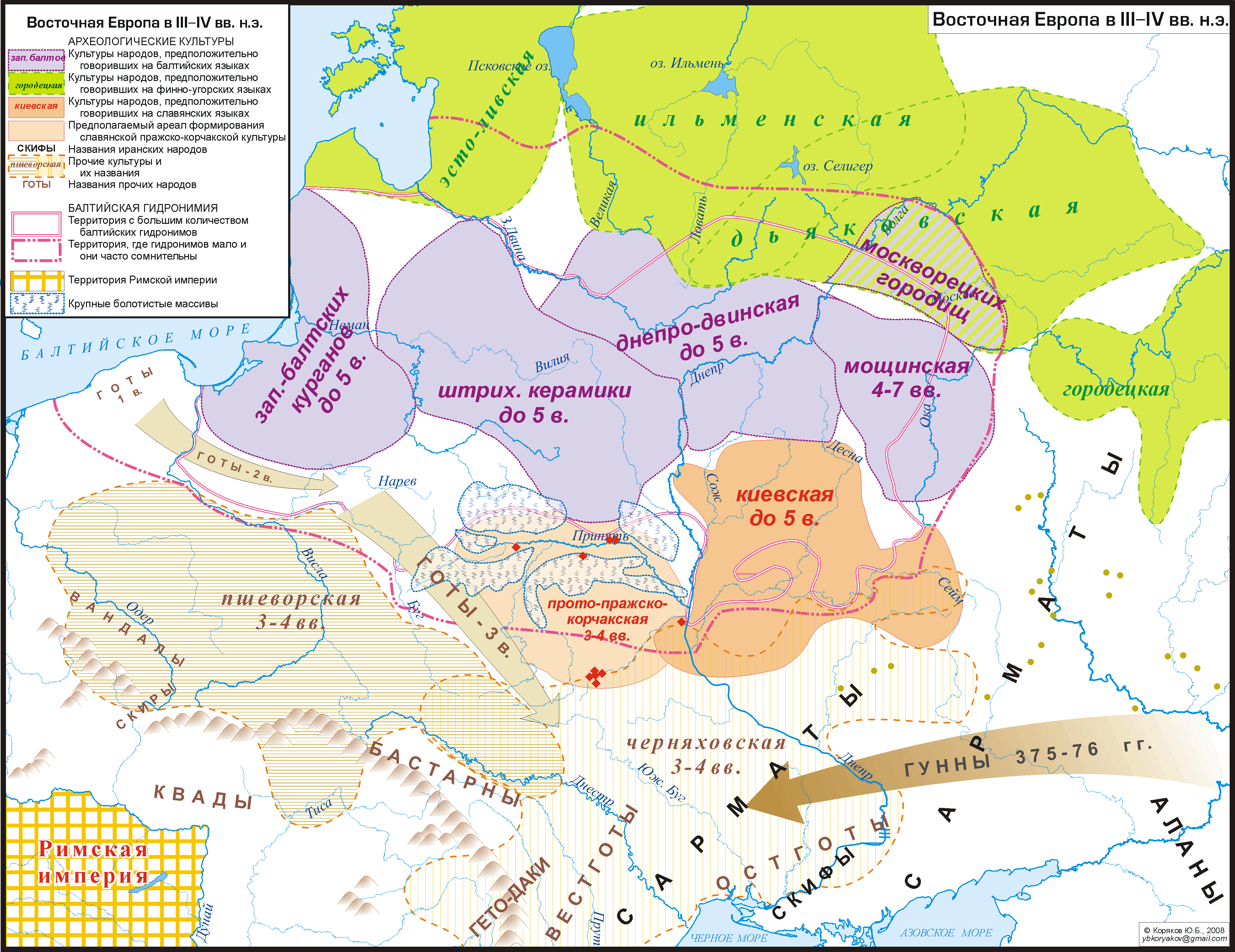
- The territory of distribution of ancient Baltic hydronyms.

The Dnieper-Oka language (Eastern Peripheral Baltic, Dnieper-Baltic) was one or several Baltic languages, the existence of which is indicated by toponymic data. It occupied the upper reaches of the Daugava, the basins of the upper Dnieper and Desna, the upper and middle Oka and the Seym. Beginning in the 7th and 8th centuries, the Baltic dialects of the region were replaced by Old East Slavic. The only known subdivision of the Dnieper-Oka language is the Golyad language.

== Language area ==
Hydronymics indicate the ancient presence of the Balts in two regions that were occupied by the East Slavs at the beginning of historical time:

- Dnieper - The most extensive, moreover, it is divided into separate relatively independent hydronymic areas (Berezinsky, Sozhsky, Pripyatsky, Desna basins), covering the northern half of the Dnieper basin from its sources to Kyiv (and even further south, cf. Viliya, Shandra, etc.) and numbering (considering variants of names and the fact that often the same name can refer to several, sometimes many water bodies) up to five to six hundred reliable hydronymic balticisms. Although their distribution throughout the Dnieper basin is uneven and strong condensations alternate with spaces that are significantly sparse in relation to balticisms, in general there is reason to speak of the continuity of the Baltic hydronymic element in the Dnieper basin.
- Oksky - The Oka basin, several hundred Baltic hydronyms + abundant borrowings in the Finno-Volgaic languages. However, along the Oka, the sparseness of Balticisms in the upper reaches, especially their practical absence within the Ryazan and Nizhny Novgorod oblasts, is combined with the density of the Baltic hydronymic layer within the Kaluga and Moscow oblasts and, surprisingly, with the thickening of Balticisms in the very lower reaches of the Oka (the latter are among the most reliable). At the end of the 20th century, studies by Yuri Otkupshchikov and Vladimir Toporov revealed the widespread distribution of Baltic hydronyms in the Moscow, Tver and Smolensk oblasts, less often in the Kaluga, Tula and Oryol oblasts (which indicates a wider area of distribution of Baltic hydronyms in the Oka region than previously assumed).

=== Middle Volga region ===
The discovery of obvious hydronymic Baltisms in the Middle Volga region has brought to the fore the problem of the eastern boundary of the Balts' settlement. Vladimir Napolskikh considers the Imenkovo culture of the Middle Volga region to be the eastern flank of the Balto-Slavic cultural and linguistic community, although this view is highly controversial.

According to Péter Hajdu, the early contacts of the Volga Finns with the Balts, on the one hand, and the ancestors of the Indo-Iranians, on the other, spatially belong to the Middle Volga region, and in time - to the common Finnish era between the beginning of the 1st millennium BC and the 6th-8th centuries AD. These contacts are evidenced by the abundant Balticisms in Finnic, and partly in the Finno-Volgaic languages, and, moreover, individual borrowings in the Baltic languages, which could have been adopted from the Finno-Volgaic languages, such as, for example, Lithuanian sóra and Latvian sāre "millet", the source of which was the original *psārā compare Erzya śora, Moksha suro "bread, grain".

== Native speakers ==
In the first centuries of our era, the territory described above was occupied by the Dnieper-Dvina (in the west) and Moshchiny (in the east) cultures, which are usually associated with the Dnieper Balts. The attribution of some neighboring cultures like the Kyiv culture to the Baltic zone is controversial. From the 5th century onwards, the Tushemla culture was formed on the territory of the Dnieper-Dvina culture, which by the 8th-9th centuries became reliably Slavic. Relics of the Moshchiny culture were preserved until the 11th–12th centuries in the north of its area, where the Eastern Galindians lived according to chronicle data.

== Bibliography ==
- Jurate Aloisovna Lauciute (1982). Словарь балтизмов в славянских языках (2750 ed.). Nauka.
- Jurate Aloisovna Lauciute О методике балто-славянских исследований // Славяне. Этногенез и этническая история. — Л.: Leningrad University Publishing House, 1989.
- Yuri Otkupshchikov Древняя гидронимия в бассейне Оки // Балто-славянские исследования XVI. М., 2004.
- Valentin Vasilievich Sedov Днепровские балты // Проблемы этногенеза и этнической истории балтов. Vilnius, 1985.
- Valentin Vasilievich Sedov Балты // Финно-угры и балты в эпоху Средневековья. М., 1987.
- Vladimir Toporov Балтийские языки // Языки мира: Балтийские языки. М.: Academia, 2006. (Стр. 32—33 посвящены селийскому языку)
- Vladimir Toporov О балтийском элементе в Подмосковье // Baltistica, 1972, I priedas.
- Топоров В. Н. (1972). "«Baltica» Подмосковья". Балто-славянский сборник (PDF). М.: Наука.
- Vladimir Toporov Голядский фон ранней Москвы. О балтийском элементе в Подмосковье // Проблемы этногенеза и этнической истории балтов. Вильнюс, 1981.
- Vladimir Toporov Балтский горизонт древней Москвы // Acta Baltico-Slavica, 1982, t. 14.
- Vladimir Toporov Древняя Москва в балтийской перспективе // Балто-славянские исследования 1981. М., 1982.
- Vladimir Toporov Балтийский элемент в гидронимии Поочья. I // Балто-славянские исследования 1986. М., 1988.
- Vladimir Toporov Балтийский элемент в гидронимии Поочья. II // Балто-славянские исследования 1987. М., 1989.
- Vladimir Toporov Балтийские следы на Верхнем Дону // Балто-славянские исследования 1988–1996. М., 1997.
- Vladimir Toporov Балтийский элемент в гидронимии Поочья. III // Балто-славянские исследования 1988–1996. М., 1997.
- Vladimir Toporov, Oleg Trubachyov Лингвистический анализ гидронимов Верхнего Поднепровья. М., 1962. Archived 2017-03-29 at the Wayback Machine
- Oleg Trubachyov Названия рек правобережной Украины. М., 1968.
