= Yuri Otkupshchikov =

Russian linguist (1924–2010)

- Юрий Откупщиков
- Born: 29 August 1924; Kazan, Soviet Union (now Russia)
- Died: 25 September 2010 (aged 86); Saint Petersburg, Russia

Academic background
- Education: Leningrad University

Academic work
- Discipline: Indo-European linguistics
- Sub-discipline: Balto-Slavic languages; Pre-Greek; Paleo-Balkan languages; classical languages; etymology
- Institutions: Saint Petersburg State University

Yuri Vladimirovich Otkupshchikov (Note: Also spelled Otkupscikov, Otkupsikov, Otkupschikov, or Otkupschtschikov) (Russian: Юрий Владимирович Откупщиков; 29 August 1924 – 25 September 2010) was a Russian philologist and linguist. For more than 50 years, he taught at the St. Petersburg State University Faculty of Philology.

== Biography ==
He was born in Kazan, Russia and graduated from high school there in 1942. Then he volunteered for war service and served with the Baltic Fleet. He took part in the battles of the Siege of Leningrad.

After the war, he studied philology at Kazan University, graduating in 1950. Then he continued his studies at the Classical Philology Department of Leningrad University, where he studied under a noted Russian philologist Ivan Tolstoi (1880–1954). In June 1953 he defended his thesis and began teaching at Leningrad University. Starting in 1956, he was sent to work for some time in Mongolia as Latin instructor, being one of the pioneers in this area. He also studied Mongolian, and published on this subject. In 1967 he received his doctorate for his monograph on the history of the Indo-European word-formation.

Otkupshchikov specialized in classical linguistics, Indo-European languages, Baltic and Slavic languages, and the etymological analysis. From 1971 to 1992, he headed the Department of Classical Philology of St. Petersburg State University.

== Contributions ==
Otkupshchikov authored over 240 scientific publications. His book “Догреческий субстрат” (1988) (The Pre-Greek substrate) received an award. Among his other works (all in Russian) are a popular science book «К истокам слова» ("The origins of speech" – 4 successive editions); collections of articles «Opera philologica minora», and «Очерки по этимологии» ("Essays on etymology"); monographs «Карийские надписи Африки» ("Carian inscriptions in Africa" [1966]), and "Фестский диск: Проблемы дешифровки" (Phaistos disk: the problems of decipherment).

=== Carian language research ===
Otkupshchikov spent 25 years on his research on the Carian and the Paleo-Balkan languages problem. In 1966, he suggested his own interpretation of the Carian alphabet, and his own reading of Carian inscriptions; he saw Carian as a language quite close to Greek, and to other Paleo-Balkan dialects. He saw the Thracian, Phrygian, and Ancient Macedonian languages as such dialects.

In his book, he was trying to justify his point of view using the analysis of Carian names and onomastics, as well as using other linguistic evidence as preserved in Greek texts. Also, according to him, his attempt to read newly discovered Carian inscriptions in Egypt gave him additional supporting evidence.

Otkupshchikov came to the conclusion that Carian was a Paleo-Balkan dialect with quite transparent onomastical links especially to the Thracian and Phrygian. The book contains much linguistic evidence for his views. Nevertheless, the questions remain whether or not Otkupshchikov managed to identify the genuine Carian element in all that ancient material or, rather, that his cases may also represent an adstrate brought in by Paleo-Balkan infiltrations.

In the latter part of his scholarly career, Otkupshchikov focused especially on the Balto-Slavic research.

=== Ancient Greek and the Paleo-Balkan languages ===
Otkupshchikov believed that the language of the ancient Phrygians was closest to the ancient Greek language. Phrygian had more features in common with ancient Greek than with other Indo-European languages. This theory finds new supporters.

He believed that:

"... Greek is genetically close to a group of related Paleo-Balkan languages, whose speakers lived in the northeastern part of the Balkan Peninsula... Later on, the ancestors of the Carians, Phrygians and Thracians, in several waves and at different times, moved to the south of the Balkan Peninsula and ... Indo-Europeanized a non-Indo-European culture, borrowing a significant amount of non-Indo-European vocabulary. However, the majority of Phrygians and Thracians moved not to the south, but to the southeast - to Asia Minor (along the path laid by the Armenians) ... The Greeks moved southward in part with the Paleo-Balkan tribes, but mostly after them."

== Awards ==
Otkupshchikov received many high official awards, both for his war service, and for his educational work.

== Bibliography ==
WorldCat entry for Otkupshchikov, I︠U︡. V.

- Yuri Otkupshchikov, Фракийцы, фригийцы и карийцы в доисторической Элладе. (Thracians, Phrygians and Carians in prehistoric Hellas) // Moscow, "Science Publishers", 1984.
- Yuri Otkupshchikov, «К истокам слова» ("The origins of speech") - Moscow: Education Publishers, 1986. 176 pp.
- Yuri Otkupshchikov, Догреческий субстрат ("The Pre-Greek substrate. At the roots of European civilization"). - Leningrad: Leningrad State University, 1988.
- Yuri Otkupshchikov, Фестский диск: Проблемы дешифровки. (Phaistos disk: the problems of decipherment.) - St. Petersburg: Publishing House of the St. Petersburg State University, 2000. 40 p. ISBN 5-288-02576-2
- Yuri Otkupshchikov, «Очерки по этимологии» ("Essays on etymology"). St. Petersburg: Publishing House of the St. Petersburg State University, 2001. 480 pp. ISBN 5-288-02121-X
- Yuri Otkupshchikov, “Opera philologica minora” (Essays in etymology and linguistics). - Moscow: Science Publishers, 2001. 456 pp. ISBN 9785020268166
- Yuri Otkupshchikov, Из истории индоевропейского словообразования. (“On the history of Indo-European word formation.”) 2nd ed. - St. Petersburg: Academy Publishers, 2005. 316p [1st ed. 1967] ISBN 5-8465-0119-2
- Yuri Otkupshchikov, «Карийские надписи Африки» // Kariǐskie nadpisi Afriki (Carian inscriptions in Africa) Leningrad: Leningrad State University, 1966
