= Golyad language =

Extinct language of the East Galindians

Golyad
- East Galindian, Golyadsky
- *Galindai
- Region: Protva basin
- Ethnicity: Eastern Galindians
- Extinct: 12th century AD
- Language family: Indo-European: Balto-Slavic; Baltic; Dnieper-Oka; Golyad

Language codes
- ISO 639-3: xgl (shared with West Galindian)
- Glottolog: None
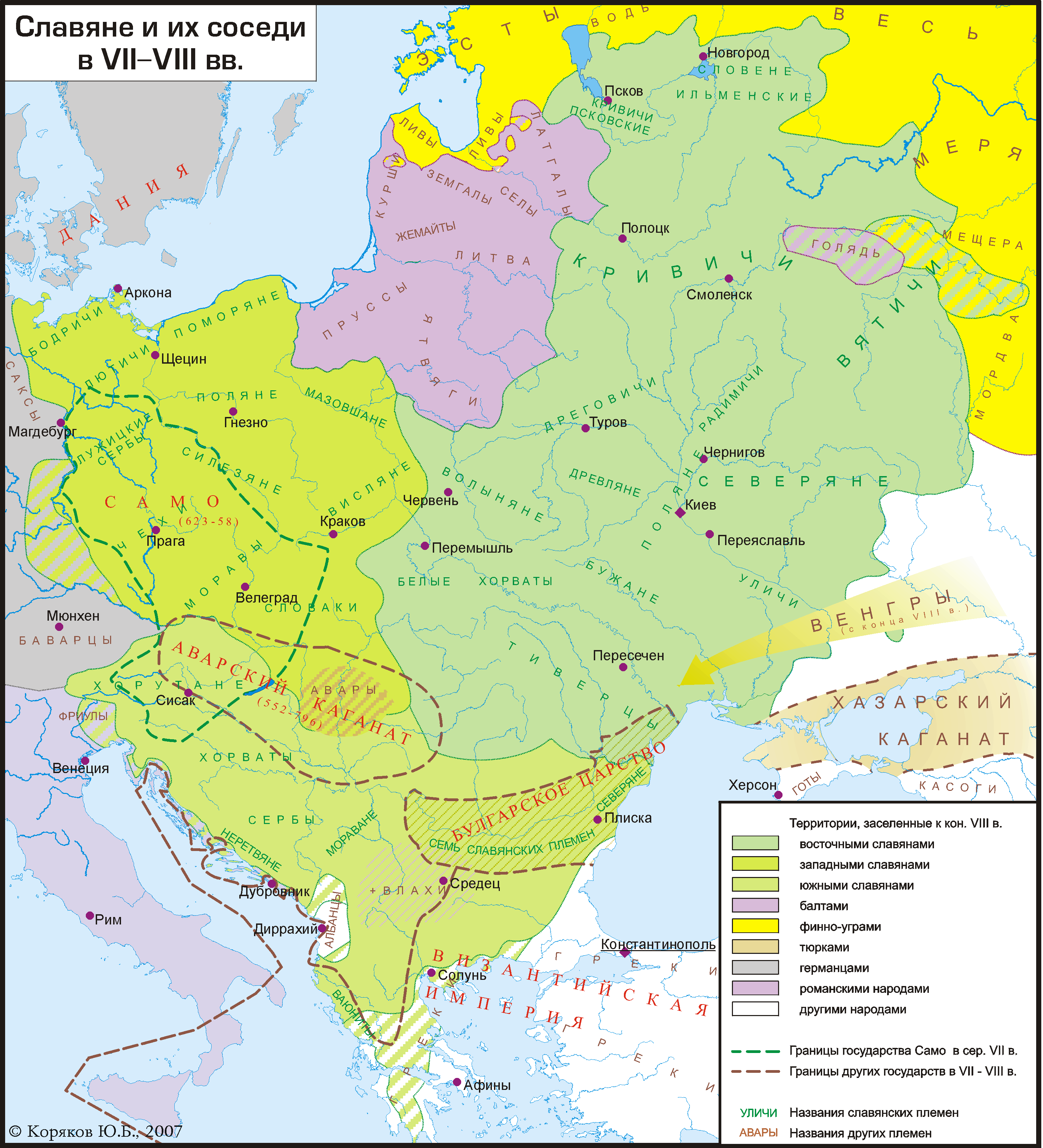
- Eastern Europe in 7–8th century with Baltic tribes shown in dark purple and Golyad people being shown in the isolated pocket within Slavic territory.

Golyad (Russian: голя́дский язык, romanized: goljádskij jazyk, based on Old East Slavic: голѧдь, romanized: golędĭ) or East Galindian (Latvian: austrumgalindu valoda, Lithuanian: rytų galindų kalba) was a poorly attested Baltic language of the Dnieper Balts living in the Protva basin in present-day Russia. The Golyad people are believed to have descended from the Moshchiny culture and is the only known ethnonym for the Dnieper-Oka language. Due to there being no known written documents of the Golyad language, the language is poorly known. The language went extinct in the 12th century due to Early Slavic migration and assimilation. It is believed the vernaculars of the Finno-Ugrians and Volga Finns adopted loanwords from Golyad language.

== Phonology ==
Based on Baltic substratum and hydronomy in the Protva basin, the following phonology can be reconstructed:

=== Consonants ===
		Labial		Dental/ Alveolar		Palatal/ Postalveolar		Velar	
Nasal			m		n		ɲ		
Stop		p	b	t	d	c	ɟ	k	ɡ
Affricate						t͡ʃ			
Fricative			v	s	z	ʃ	ʒ		
Approximant	median						j		
Approximant	lateral				l		ʎ		
Trill					r		rʲ		

=== Vowels ===
	Front		Central		Back	
	short	long	short	long	short	long
High	i	iː			u	uː
Mid		eː				oː
Mid-low	ɛ					
Low			a	aː		

==== Diphthongs ====
	Vocalic diphthongs		Mixed diphthongs	
	-i	-u	-m	-n
a-	ai	au	am	an
ɛ-	ɛi	ɛu	ɛm	ɛn

== Lexicon ==
There are some Russian dialectal words from the Protva basin region suspected to be of Baltic origin:

Russian	Transliteration	Translation	Proposed Baltic cognates
алáня	alánja	'beer'	Lithuanian: alìnas 'special type of beer', Lithuanian: alùs, Latvian: aliņš
кромсáть	kromsát'	'to break something into pieces'	Lithuanian: kramsė́ti, Latvian: kramstīt
нóрот	nórot	'fishing gear'	Lithuanian: nérti, Latvian: nērt 'to sink'
пикýлька	pikúl'ka	'type of weed'	Lithuanian: pìkulė 'sisymbrium'

It is believed that the hydronyms "Lama", "Yauza", "Nudol" and "Churilikha" have Baltic origins. Specifically, the Churilikha's name has origins in the Lithuanian word for narrow and other names for the Churilikha such as Goledyanka have origins from the Golyad themselves. It is also believed that the name of the two villages of Golyadi has their names originate from the Golyads.

== Bibliography ==
- Dini, Pietro U. (2014), Foundations of Baltic languages, translated by Richardson, Milda B.; Richardson, Robert E., Vilnius: Vilniaus universitetas, ISBN 978-609-437-263-6
