= Jonas Kazlauskas (linguist) =

Lithuanian linguist

Jonas Kazlauskas (1 August 1930 – 7 October 1970, in Vilnius) was a Lithuanian linguist and an expert on the Baltic languages. Jonas Kazlauskas was born and grew up near Birštonas, a city in the Nemuna region of Lithuania.

== Career and Education ==
In 1949, he enrolled at the University of Vilnius at the age of 18, where he then received a bachelor of arts degree in 1954. During university, he began his study of many languages, and by 1959, he had earned a philosophy degree in linguistics. During the late 1950s, he began his work as a lecturer at the same university. He was promoted later to dean of the Humanities faculty at the University of Vilnius. In 1965, he was one of the founders of the journal Baltistica. Baltistica was a Baltic linguistics magazine that gained recognition in the late 1960s. In 1970, he was named visiting professor at Pennsylvania State in the United States as he was also invited to teach a course based on Baltic linguistics at the university. However, he died before he could travel back to Pennsylvania.

== Death ==
He died in October 1970 under mysterious circumstances. His body was found in the Neris River weeks after he went missing. During the autopsy, no water was found in his lungs. According to the official report of his death, it lists a suicide. Since the circumstances around his death were mysterious, it was rumored that the KGB tried to recruit him as an informer since he was traveling into the US, and he refused, leading him to be killed. It was also claimed that he was seen meeting with agents during the same summer. Some sources also claim that any documents from the KGB archives were wiped leading to the suspicion of their involvement in the circumstances of his death. He was buried on 20 November 1970 in Sunny cemetery in Vilnius.
