= West Baltic languages =

Extinct Branch of Baltic languages

West Baltic
- Geographic distribution: In the northeast of Central Europe, western parts of Baltic region
- Linguistic classification: Indo-European: Balto-Slavic; Baltic?; West Baltic
- Subdivisions: Prussian (†); Old Curonian †; Sudovian †; ?Pomeranian Baltic[ru] †; ?Skalvian †; ?West Galindian †

Language codes
- ISO 639-5: bat
- Linguasphere: 54=
- Former extent of West Baltic languages (including disputed ones) in 11–12th century Europe. Diagonal lines represent territories shared with other tribes. West Baltic languages Old Curonian † Old Prussian † Sudovian † Skalvian † West Galindian †

The West Baltic languages are a group of Balto-Slavic languages that were spoken by Baltic peoples. West Baltic is one of the two primary branches posited for the Baltic languages, along with East Baltic. It includes Old Prussian, Sudovian, West Galindian, possibly Pomeranian Baltic, Skalvian and Old Curonian.

== Attestation ==
The only properly attested West Baltic language of which texts are known is Old Prussian, although there are a few short remnants of Old Curonian and Sudovian in the form of isolated words and short phrases. Many West Baltic languages went extinct in the 16th century while Old Prussian ceased to be spoken in the early 18th century.

== Classification ==
The only languages securely classified as West Baltic are Old Prussian and West Galindian, which could also be a dialect of Old Prussian.

Most scholars consider Skalvian to be a West Baltic language or dialect. Another possible classification is a transitional language between West and East Baltic.

Sudovian is either classified as an Old Prussian dialect, a West Baltic language or a transitional language between West and East Baltic. The former two options would leave Sudovian in the West Baltic phylum.

Old Curonian is the least securely classified language. It is argued to be either West Baltic with significant East Baltic influence, or East Baltic.

== History ==
West Baltic was presumably native to the north of Central Europe, especially modern Poland, and the western Baltic region, which includes parts of modern Latvia and Lithuania. The West Baltic branch probably fully separated from East Baltic around the 4th–3rd century BCE, although their differences go as far as the middle of the last millennium BC.

== Linguistic features ==
Unlike the East Baltic languages, West Baltic languages generally conserved the following features: the diphthong *ei (e.g. deiws 'god', (acc) deinan 'day'), palatalized consonants /kʲ/, /gʲ/ (they are preserved also in the Lithuanian language), and the consonant clusters /tl/ and /dl/. They also preserved three genders: masculine, feminine and neuter. Sudovian and Old Curonian shared the suffix -ng-, which can be observed in various hydronyms and oeconyms (e.g. Apsingė, Nedzingė, Pilvingis, Suvingis, Palanga, Alsunga) found in southern Lithuania, western Lithuania and Latvia. West Balts possessed double-stemmed personal names with distinct compounds (e.g. Net(i)-, Sebei-), which are unusual to the anthroponymy of the East Balts.

West Baltic languages are traditionally characterised by having at least few of the following six key linguistic features: 1 – primordial diphthong *ei, 2 – equivalents to IE velars *k and *g, 3 – *AN type compounds, 4 – equivalents to palatals *k‘ and *g‘, 5 – equivalents to Baltic consonant compounds *tj and *td, 6 – equivalents to Baltic Vowels *ā and *ō. Based on the degree of consensus existing in the academic community, the first two points are sometimes regarded as strong features whereas the remaining four are identified as weak features. There are differences in vocalic variations in the root (aR / eR and a / e) between East and West Baltic languages that possibly emerged due to development of Baltic phonology, categories of word-formation, categorical semantics of the verb or traces of IE perfect.

Findings on the Lithuanian Zatiela subdialect in present-day Dyatlovo suggest that it had preserved certain linguistic traits associated with West Baltic languages, primarily Sudovian, such as the incomplete transition of diphthong ei to ie (e.g. sviekas ‘hello’, sviekata ‘health’, pasviek ‘get well’), turn of vowel u into i before consonant v (e.g. brivai ‘eyebrows’, liživis ‘tongue’, živis, živė ‘fish’), use of diphthong ai instead of a (e.g. dailyti ‘distribute’), shortening of nominal singular endings (e.g. arkluks ‘little horse’, dieus, dies ‘god’, niks ‘nothing’, vaiks ‘child’), use of consonant z instead of ž (e.g. ząsis, ząsė ‘goose’, zvėris, zvėrys ‘beast’, zvaiždė ‘star’). The said subdialect is believed to have retained an archaic feature from the Sudovian language – the usage of compound consonants šč, št, žd and st without inserting consonants k, g (e.g. auštas ‘high, tall’, pauštė ‘bird’, spiūsna ‘feather’, žvirždos ‘sand, pebble’) — which also corresponds to examples found in Old Prussian (e.g. aūss ‘gold’, rīsti ‘whip’). Personal pronoun forms have also been noted for possessing features found in West Baltic languages, such as the turn of consonant v into j when applying instrumental or adessive singular cases (e.g. sajim (ins), sajip, savip (ade) ‘with oneself’, tajim (ins), tajip (ade) ‘with you’). Old literary Lithuanian texts from Lithuania Minor attest the use of the third person singular past tense form bit(i) ‘was’ as well as prefix–preposition sa(-), which are most likely linguistic features inherited from West Baltic languages.

== Pomeranian-Baltic language ==
Pomeranian Baltic
- Pomeranian-Baltic, Pomeranian-Prussian, Pomorian-Baltic, Pomor-Baltic
- Native to: Poland
- Region: Baltic Pomerania
- Ethnicity: Pomeranian Balts
- Extinct: 1st millennium BC
- Language family: Indo-European: Balto-Slavic; Baltic?; West Baltic; Pomeranian Baltic

Language codes
- ISO 639-3: None (mis)
- Glottolog: None

The Pomeranian Baltic language is one of the Western Baltic languages that has been reconstructed based on toponymic data. The language was represented in Baltic Pomerania and has several Prussian-type Balticisms like Gdańsk and Gdynia. The language was replaced by the East Germanic languages.
