= Galindian language =

Extinct Baltic languages

The term Galindian is sometimes ascribed to two separate Baltic languages, both of which were peripheral dialects:

- a West Baltic language referred to as West Galindian;
- a Baltic language previously spoken in Mozhaysk region (present day Russia), referred to as East Galindian or Golyad

== Name ==
There are three proposed etymologies for the denomination Galindian:

- Proto-Baltic *Galind- meaning 'outsider' (Lithuanian: gãlas 'wall; border'). This is supported by the etymology of the common Old Russian term for the Galindians Голядь Goljad' > Proto-Slavic *golędь > Proto-Baltic *Galind-); the Proto-Slavic *ę denotes a nasal e (/ẽ/)
- It is derived from the root *gal-/*gil found in Baltic hydronyms; and
- The name means 'the powerful ones' (Lithuanian: galià 'power, strength') and also Celtic languages (Irish: gal 'strength', Welsh: gallus 'power', Galli, Gallia).

== Proposed relation ==
Golyad and West Galindian have been proposed by scientists to have had a common origin that is based on two ancient authors using the common name of Galindian for both of them. In order to prove this hypothesis, they investigate common features between Prussian/West Galindian and Golyad.

Marija Gimbutas suggested that both the Golyads and West Galindians name could both originate from the word for end or borderland in Lithuanian (gãlas) and Latvian (gàls). There has also been a suggestion that the West Galindians' name could come from the Prussian word for death (gallan). This name could have come from the Golyad being the furthest Baltic tribe in the east.

Some theories that propose a relationship between West Galindian and Golyad are that the West Galindians migrated from their homeland in Prussia towards the Protva basin. People believe this migration would have been one in the Migration Period and would have occurred between the 5th and 7th centuries. In this theory, another group who also migrated West during this period, the Goths, are believed to have also inspired the language and culture of the Golyads. Another theory is that the Golyads were West Galindians that were captured during wars with the Grand Duchy of Lithuania and the Russian duchies, but this is unlikely as local Slavs would not have replaced their own names for regions with names from their prisoners of war.
