= Baltic languages =

Branch of the Indo-European language family

Baltic
- Geographic distribution: Northern Europe, historically also Eastern Europe and Central Europe
- Ethnicity: Balts
- Native speakers: 7 million
- Linguistic classification: Indo-European: Balto-Slavic; Baltic
- Proto-language: Proto-Baltic
- Subdivisions: Dnieper-Oka † • Golyad †; East; West †

Language codes
- ISO 639-2 / 5: bat
- Glottolog: None east2280 East Baltic prus1238 Old Prussian
- Linguasphere: 54=
- Countries where an East Baltic language is the national language

- Extent of Baltic languages in present-day Europe, with languages traditionally considered to be dialects mentioned in Italics East Baltic languages Latgalian Latvian Lithuanian Samogitian

The Baltic languages are a branch of the Indo-European language family spoken natively or as a second language by a population of about 6.5–7.0 million people mainly in areas extending east and southeast of the Baltic Sea in Europe. Together with the Slavic languages, they form the Balto-Slavic branch of the Indo-European family.

Scholars usually regard them as a single subgroup divided into two branches: West Baltic (containing only extinct languages) and East Baltic (containing at least two living languages, Lithuanian, Latvian, and by some counts including Latgalian and Samogitian as separate languages rather than dialects of those two). In addition, the existence of the Dnieper-Oka language is hypothesized, with the now-extinct Golyad language being the only known member. The range of the East Baltic linguistic influence once possibly reached as far as the Ural Mountains, but this hypothesis has been questioned.

Old Prussian, a Western Baltic language that faced extinction in the 18th century, had possibly conserved the greatest number of properties from Proto-Baltic.

Although related, Lithuanian, Latvian, and particularly Old Prussian have lexicons that differ substantially from one another and so the languages are not mutually intelligible. Relatively low mutual interaction for neighbouring languages historically led to gradual erosion of mutual intelligibility, and development of their respective linguistic innovations that did not exist in shared Proto-Baltic. The substantial number of false friends and various uses and sources of loanwords from their surrounding languages are considered to be the major reasons for poor mutual intelligibility today.

== Branches ==
Within Indo-European, the Baltic languages are generally classified as forming a single family with two branches: Eastern and Western Baltic. But these two branches are sometimes classified as independent branches of Balto-Slavic itself.

Baltic languages by number of native speakers
East Baltic
Latvian	c. 1.5 million
Latgalian*	150,000–200,000
Lithuanian	c. 4.5 million
Samogitian*	500,000
Selonian†	Extinct since 16th century
Semigallian†	Extinct since 16th century
Old Curonian†	Extinct since 16th century
West Baltic
Western Galindian†	Extinct since 14th century
Old Prussian	Extinct since early 18th century; Revived in the 21st century 2 native speakers
Pomeranian Baltic†	Extinct since the 1st millennium BC
Skalvian†	Extinct since 16th century
Sudovian†	Extinct since 17th century
Dnieper-Oka
Golyad†	Extinct since 12th century
Italics indicate disputed classification.
* indicates languages sometimes considered to be dialects.
† indicates extinct languages.

== History ==
It is believed that the Baltic languages are among the most conservative of the currently remaining Indo-European languages, despite their late attestation.

Although the Baltic Aesti tribe was mentioned by ancient historians such as Tacitus as early as 98 CE, the first attestation of a Baltic language was c. 1369, in a Basel epigram of two lines written in Old Prussian. Lithuanian was first attested in a printed book, which is a Catechism by Martynas Mažvydas published in 1547. Latvian appeared in a printed Catechism in 1585.

One reason for the late attestation is that the Baltic peoples resisted Christianization longer than any other Europeans, which delayed the introduction of writing and isolated their languages from outside influence.

With the establishment of a German state in Prussia, and the mass influx of Germanic (and to a lesser degree Slavic-speaking) settlers, the Prussians began to be assimilated, and by the end of the 17th century, the Prussian language had become extinct.

After the Partitions of Polish-Lithuanian Commonwealth, most of the Baltic lands were under the rule of the Russian Empire, where the native languages or alphabets were sometimes prohibited from being written down or used publicly in a Russification effort (see Lithuanian press ban for the ban in force from 1864 to 1904).

== Geographic distribution ==
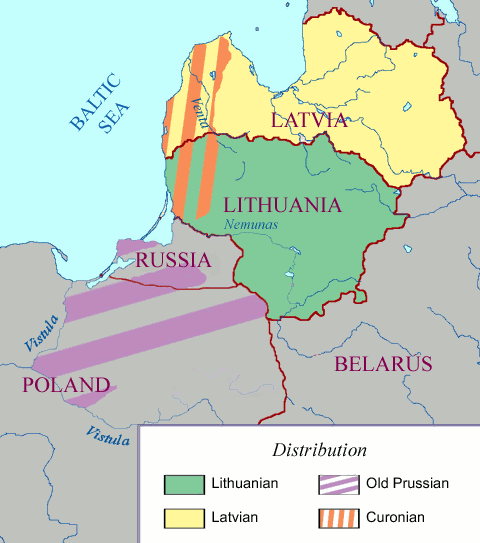
Distribution of the Baltic languages in the Baltic (simplified)

Map of the area of distribution of Baltic hydronyms.

Speakers of modern Baltic languages are generally concentrated within the borders of Lithuania and Latvia, and in emigrant communities in the United States, Canada, Australia and the countries within the former borders of the Soviet Union.

Historically the languages were spoken over a larger area: west to the mouth of the Vistula river in present-day Poland, at least as far east as the Dniepr river in present-day Belarus, perhaps even to Moscow, and perhaps as far south as Kyiv. Key evidence of Baltic language presence in these regions is found in hydronyms (names of bodies of water) that are characteristically Baltic. The use of hydronyms is generally accepted to determine the extent of a culture's influence, but not the date of such influence.

The eventual expansion of the use of Slavic languages in the south and east, and Germanic languages in the west, reduced the geographic distribution of Baltic languages to a fraction of the area that they formerly covered. The Russian geneticist Oleg Balanovsky speculated that there is a predominance of the assimilated pre-Slavic substrate in the genetics of East and West Slavic populations, according to him the common genetic structure which contrasts East Slavs and Balts from other populations may suggest that the pre-Slavic substrate of the East Slavs consists most significantly of Baltic-speakers, which predated the Slavs in the cultures of the Eurasian steppe according to archaeological references he cites.

=== Contact with Uralic languages ===
Though Estonia is geopolitically included among the Baltic states due to its location, Estonian is a Finnic language of the Uralic language family and is not related to the Baltic languages, which are Indo-European.

The Mordvinic languages, spoken mainly along western tributaries of the Volga, show several dozen loanwords from one or more Baltic languages, in the Erzya and Moksha dialects. These may have been mediated by contacts with the Eastern Balts along the river Oka. In regards to the same geographical location, Asko Parpola, in a 2013 article, suggested that the Baltic presence in this area, dated to c. 200–600 CE, is due to an "elite superstratum". However, linguist Petri Kallio argued that the Volga-Oka is a secondary Baltic-speaking area, expanding from East Baltic, due to a large number of Baltic loanwords in Finnic and Saami.

Finnish scholars also indicate that Latvian had extensive contacts with Livonian, and, to a lesser extent, to Estonian and South Estonian. Therefore, this contact accounts for the number of Finnic hydronyms in Lithuania and Latvia that increase in a northwards direction.

Parpola, in the same 2013 article, supposed the existence of a Baltic substratum for Finnic, in Estonia and coastal Finland. In the same vein, Kallio argues for the existence of a lost "North Baltic language" that would account for loanwords during the evolution of the Finnic branch.

== Comparative linguistics ==
=== Genetic relatedness ===
Various schematic sketches of possible Balto-Slavic language relationships.

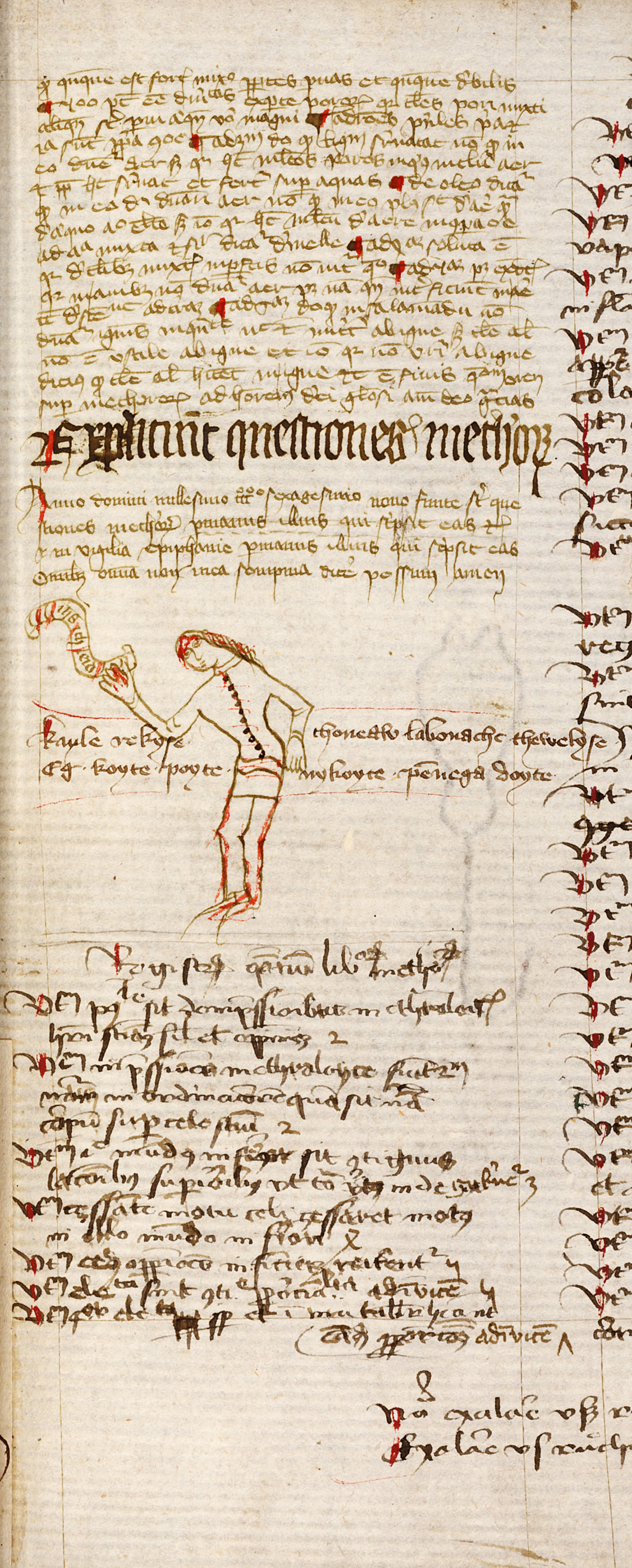
The epigram of Basel – oldest known inscription in Prussian language and Baltic language in general, middle of 14th c

The Baltic languages are of particular interest to linguists because they retain many archaic features, which are thought to have been present in the early stages of the Proto-Indo-European language. However, linguists have had a hard time establishing the precise relationship of the Baltic languages to other languages in the Indo-European family. Several of the extinct Baltic languages have a limited or nonexistent written record, their existence being known only from the records of ancient historians and personal or place names. All of the languages in the Baltic group (including the living ones) were first written down relatively late in their probable existence as distinct languages. These two factors combined with others have obscured the history of the Baltic languages, leading to a number of theories regarding their position in the Indo-European family.

The Baltic languages show a close relationship with the Slavic languages, and are grouped with them in a Balto-Slavic family by most scholars. This family is considered to have developed from a common ancestor, Proto-Balto-Slavic. Later on, several lexical, phonological and morphological dialectisms developed, separating the various Balto-Slavic languages from each other. Although it is generally agreed that the Slavic languages developed from a single more-or-less unified dialect (Proto-Slavic) that split off from common Balto-Slavic, there is more disagreement about the relationship between the Baltic languages.

The traditional view is that the Balto-Slavic languages split into two branches, Baltic and Slavic, with each branch developing as a single common language (Proto-Baltic and Proto-Slavic) for some time afterwards. Proto-Baltic is then thought to have split into East Baltic and West Baltic branches. However, more recent scholarship has suggested that there was no unified Proto-Baltic stage, but that Proto-Balto-Slavic split directly into three groups: Slavic, East Baltic and West Baltic. Under this view, the Baltic family is paraphyletic, and consists of all Balto-Slavic languages that are not Slavic. In the 1960s Vladimir Toporov and Vyacheslav Ivanov made the following conclusions about the relationship between the Baltic and Slavic languages:

- the Proto-Slavic language formed out of peripheral-type Baltic dialects;
- the Slavic linguistic type formed later from the structural model of the Baltic languages;
- the Slavic structural model is a result of the transformation from the Baltic languages structural model.

These scholars' theses do not contradict the close relationship between Baltic and Slavic languages and, from a historical perspective, specify the Baltic-Slavic languages' evolution – the terms 'Baltic' and 'Slavic' are relevant only from the point of view of the present time, meaning diachronic changes, and the oldest stage of the language development could be called both Baltic and Slavic; this concept does not contradict the traditional thesis that the Proto-Slavic and Proto-Baltic languages coexisted for a long time after their formation – between the 2nd millennium BC and circa the 5th century BC – the Proto-Slavic language was a continuum of the Proto-Baltic dialects, more rather, the Proto-Slavic language should have been localized in the peripheral circle of Proto-Baltic dialects.

Finally, a minority of scholars argue that Baltic descended directly from Proto-Indo-European, without an intermediate common Balto-Slavic stage. They argue that the many similarities and shared innovations between Baltic and Slavic are caused by several millennia of contact between the groups, rather than a shared heritage.

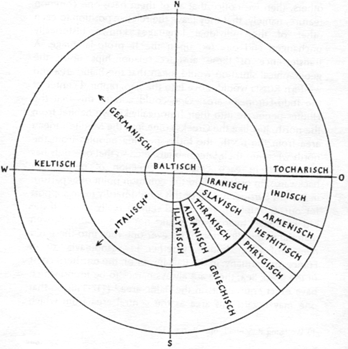
Place of Baltic languages according to Wolfgang P. Schmid, 1977.

=== Thracian hypothesis ===
The Baltic-speaking peoples likely encompassed an area in eastern Europe much larger than their modern range. As in the case of the Celtic languages of Western Europe, they were reduced by invasion, extermination and assimilation. Studies in comparative linguistics point to genetic relationship between the languages of the Baltic family and the following extinct languages:

- Dacian
- Thracian

The Baltic classification of Dacian and Thracian has been proposed by the Lithuanian scientist Jonas Basanavičius, who insisted this is the most important work of his life and listed 600 identical words of Balts and Thracians. His theory included Phrygian in the related group, but this did not find support and was disapproved among other authors, such as Ivan Duridanov, whose own analysis found Phrygian completely lacking parallels in either Thracian or Baltic languages.

The Bulgarian linguist Ivan Duridanov, who improved the most extensive list of toponyms, in his first publication claimed that Thracian is genetically linked to the Baltic languages and in the next one he made the following classification:

The Thracian language formed a close group with the Baltic, the Dacian and the "Pelasgian" languages. More distant were its relations with the other Indo-European languages, and especially with Greek, the Italic and Celtic languages, which exhibit only isolated phonetic similarities with Thracian; the Tocharian and the Hittite were also distant.

Of about 200 reconstructed Thracian words by Duridanov most cognates (138) appear in the Baltic languages, mostly in Lithuanian, followed by Germanic (61), Indo-Aryan (41), Greek (36), Bulgarian (23), Latin (10) and Albanian (8). The cognates of the reconstructed Dacian words in his publication are found mostly in the Baltic languages, followed by Albanian. Parallels have enabled linguists, using the techniques of comparative linguistics, to decipher the meanings of several Dacian and Thracian placenames with, they claim, a high degree of probability. Of 74 Dacian placenames attested in primary sources and considered by Duridanov, a total of 62 have Baltic cognates, most of which were rated "certain" by Duridanov. For a big number of 300 Thracian geographic names most parallels were found between Thracian and Baltic geographic names in the study of Duridanov. According to him the most important impression make the geographic cognates of Baltic and Thracian "the similarity of these parallels stretching frequently on the main element and the suffix simultaneously, which makes a strong impression".

Romanian linguist Sorin Paliga, analysing and criticizing Harvey Mayer's study, did admit "great likeness" between Thracian, the substrate of Romanian, and "some Baltic forms".

== See also ==
- Historical linguistics
- Dacian–Baltic connection

== Bibliography ==
- "Lithuania 1863–1893: Tsarist Russification and the Beginnings of the Modern Lithuanian National Movement – Strazas". www.lituanus.org. Archived from the original on 12 December 2016.
- "Lituanus Linguistics Index (1955–2004)". Archived from the original on 21 January 2016. provides a number of articles on modern and archaic Baltic languages
- Duridanov, I. (1969). Die Thrakisch- und Dakisch-Baltischen Sprachbeziehungen.
- Duridanov, I. (1976). Ezikyt na Trakite.
- Duridanov, Ivan (1985). Die Sprache der Thraker. Bulgarische Sammlung (in German). Vol. 5. Hieronymus Verlag. ISBN 3-88893-031-6.
- Fraenkel, Ernst (1950). Die baltischen Sprachen. Heidelberg: Carl Winter.
- Girininkas, Algirdas (1994). "The monuments of the Stone Age in the historical Baltic region". Baltų archeologija (1). English summary, p. 22. ISSN 1392-0189.
- Girininkas, Algirdas (1994). "Origin of the Baltic culture. Summary". Baltų kultūros ištakos. Vilnius: Savastis. p. 259. ISBN 9986-420-00-8.
- Gelumbeckaitė, Jolanta (2018). "The evolution of Baltic". In Jared Klein; Brian Joseph; Matthias Fritz (eds.). Handbook of Comparative and Historical Indo-European Linguistics. Vol. 3. Berlin, Boston: De Gruyter Mouton. pp. 1712–15. doi:10.1515/9783110542431-014.
- Larsson, Jenny Helena; Bukelskytė-Čepelė, Kristina (2018). "The documentation of Baltic". In Jared Klein; Brian Joseph; Matthias Fritz (eds.). Handbook of Comparative and Historical Indo-European Linguistics. Vol. 3. Berlin, Boston: De Gruyter Mouton. pp. 1622–1639. doi:10.1515/9783110542431-008.
- Mallory, J. P. (1991). In Search of the Indo-Europeans: language, archaeology and myth. New York: Thames and Hudson. ISBN 0-500-27616-1.
- Mayer, H.E. (1992). "Dacian and Thracian as southern Baltoidic". Lituanus. 38 (2). Defense Language Institute, United States Department of Defense. ISSN 0024-5089. Archived from the original on 16 December 2017.
- Mayer, H.E. (1996). "SOUTH BALTIC". Lituanus. 42 (2). Archived from the original on 13 May 2021.
- Mayer, H.E. (1997). "BALTS AND CARPATHIANS". Lituanus. 43 (2). Archived from the original on 13 May 2021.
- Pashka, Joseph (1950). Proto Baltic and Baltic languages.
- Remys, Edmund (17 December 2007). "General distinguishing features of various lndo-European languages and their relationship to Lithuanian". Indogermanische Forschungen. 112 (2007): 244–276. doi:10.1515/9783110192858.1.244. ISSN 1613-0405.
- Mayer, H.E. (1999). "Dr. Harvey E. Mayer, February 1999".
- Dini, Pietro U. (2014). Foundations of Baltic languages. Translated by Richardson, Milda B.; Richardson, Robert E. Vilnius: Vilniaus universitetas. ISBN 978-609-437-263-6.

== Literature ==
- Stafecka, Anna; Mikulėnienė, Danguolė (2009). Atlas of the Baltic languages. Rīga : Vilnius: Latvijas Universitātes Latviešu valodas institūts; Lietuvių kalbos institutas. ISBN 978-9984-742-49-6.
- Dini, Pietro U. (2000). Baltų kalbos: lyginamoji istorija [Baltic languages: A Comparative History] (in Lithuanian). Vilnius: Mokslo ir enciklopedijų leidybos institutas. p. 540. ISBN 5-420-01444-0.
- Palmaitis, Letas [in Lithuanian] (1998). Baltų kalbų gramatinės sistemos raida [Development of the grammatical system of the Baltic Languages: Lithuanian, Latvian, Prussian] (PDF) (in Lithuanian). Kaunas: Šviesa. ISBN 5-430-02651-4.
