= East Baltic languages =

Branch of Baltic languages

East Baltic
- Geographic distribution: In Northern Europe, Baltic region
- Linguistic classification: Indo-European: Balto-Slavic; Baltic?; East Baltic
- Subdivisions: Latvian • Latgalian; Lithuanian • Aukštaitian • Samogitian; Selonian †; Semigallian †

Language codes
- ISO 639-5: bat
- Linguasphere: 54=
- Glottolog: east2280
- Extent of Baltic languages in present day Europe with languages traditionally considered to be dialects mentioned in Italics East Baltic languages Latgalian Latvian Lithuanian Samogitian

The East Baltic languages are a group of languages that along with the extinct West Baltic languages belong to the Baltic branch of the Indo-European language family. The East Baltic branch primarily consists of two extant languages—Latvian and Lithuanian. Occasionally, Latgalian and Samogitian are viewed as distinct languages, though they are traditionally regarded as dialects. It also includes now-extinct Selonian, Semigallian, and possibly Old Curonian.

Lithuanian is the most-spoken East Baltic language, with more than 3 million speakers worldwide, followed by Latvian, with 1.75 million native speakers, then Samogitan with 500,000 native speakers, and lastly Latgalian with 150,000 native speakers.

== History ==
Originally, East Baltic was presumably native to the north of Eastern Europe, which included modern Latvia, Lithuania, northern parts of current European Russia and Belarus. Dnieper Balts lived in the current territory of Moscow, which was the furthest undisputed eastern territory inhabited by the Baltic people.

Traditionally, it is believed that West and East Baltic people had already possessed certain unique traits that separated them in the middle of the last millennium BC and began to permanently split from a common Proto-Baltic ancestor between the 5th and 3rd centuries BC. During this time, West and East Balts adopted different traditions and customs. They had separate ceramics and housebuilding traditions. In addition, both groups had their own burial customs: unlike their Western counterparts, it is believed that East Balts would burn the remains of the dead and scatter the ashes on the ground or in nearby rivers and lakes. It is also known that East Balts were much more susceptible to the cultural influences coming from their Baltic Finnic neighbours in the northeast.

== Linguistic features ==
The East Baltic languages are less archaic than their Western counterparts, with Latvian being the most innovative Baltic language. Certain linguistic features of East Baltic languages are usually explained by contacts with their Baltic Finnic neighbours. It is believed that stress retraction in Latvian is a consequence of their influence. Linguistic traits observed in the grammar of the Lithuanian language, such as the alteration of consonants p and b in Lithuanian dialects, the use of various syntactic borrowings like genitive of negation (cf. nematau vilko (gen) 'I don’t see a wolf'; matau vilką (acc) 'I see a wolf') or indirect mood (e.g. nešęs velnias akmenį 'a devil who was bringing the stone') are also attributed to the influence of Baltic Finnic languages.

Other extinct languages of the Eastern family group are poorly understood as they are practically unattested. However, from the analysis of hydronyms and retained loanwords, it is known that Selonian and Old Curonian languages possessed the retention of nasal vowels *an, *en, *in, *un. It is noted that Selonian, Semigallian and Old Latgalian palatalised soft velars *k, *g into *c, *dz while also depalatalising the sounds *š, *ž into *s, *z respectively. This is observed in hydronyms and oeconyms (e.g. Zirnajai, Zalvas, Zarasai) as well as loanwords preserved in Lithuanian and Latvian dialects. It is believed that Semigallian possessed an uninflected pronoun, which was the equivalent to the Lithuanian savo (e.g. Sem. Savazirgi, Lith. savo žirgai, meaning 'one's horses'). East Baltic would in many cases turn the diphthong *ei into a monophthong, pronounced like the contemporary Latvian jē and Lithuanian ė. This would further develop in Lithuanian and Latvian to become the present diphthong *ie (e.g. Lat. dievs, Lith. dievas 'god'). This innovation becomes obvious when comparing ablauted words of the same root, where o-grade words do not reflect this change (e.g. Lat. ciems, Lith. kaimas 'village'). Unlike their Western counterparts, East Baltic languages usually tend to keep their short vowels *o and *a separately (e.g. Lat. duot, Lith. duoti 'give' as opposed to Lat. māte, Lith. motina 'mother').
