= Curonian language =

Extinct Baltic language of Courland

Old Curonian
- Native to: Latvia, Lithuania, Germany (historically)
- Extinct: 16th century
- Language family: Indo-European: Balto-Slavic; Baltic?; East or West Baltic; Old Curonian

Language codes
- ISO 639-3: xcu
- Glottolog: curo1234
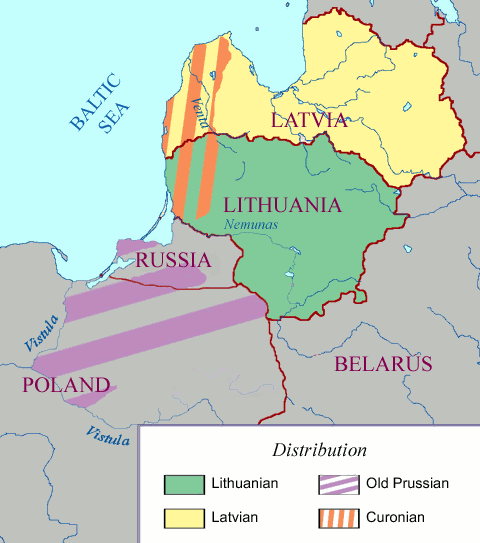
- Curonian

Distribution of the Baltic tribes, circa 1200 CE (boundaries are approximate)

The Curonian language (German: Kurisch; Latvian: Kuršu valoda; Lithuanian: Kuršių kalba), or Old Curonian, was a Baltic language spoken by the Curonians, a Baltic tribe who inhabited Courland (now western Latvia and northwestern Lithuania).

== Classification ==
Curonian was an Indo-European language of the Baltic branch, as proven by Jānis Endzelīns.

Curonian's relation to other Baltic languages is unclear:

- Some scholars consider it to have been an East Baltic language, intermediate between Lithuanian and Latvian.
- Others, like Vytautas Mažiulis, classify it as a West Baltic language that became closer to the Eastern branch due to extensive contact.
- Linguist Eduard Vääri argues that it is possible that Curonians were Baltic Finns.

== History ==
Old Curonian disappeared in the course of the 16th century.

Since the end of the 20th century, there has been a revival of scientific and cultural interest in Latvia and Lithuania in the now extinct Baltic languages and tribes, including Yotvingian, Curonian, and Old Prussian.

== Lexicon ==
Samogitian words such as kuisis (mosquito), pylė (duck), blezdinga (swallow), cyrulis (skylark), zuikis (hare), kūlis (stone), purvs (marsh), and pūrai (winter wheat) are considered to be of Curonian origin.

Further words show similarities with Old Prussian: *kela and Old Prussian: kelan compared to Lithuanian: rãtas, Latvian: rats, all meaning wheel.

== Corpus ==
=== Evidence from other languages ===
Curonian left substrata in western dialects of the Latvian and Lithuanian, namely the Samogitian dialect. No written documents in this language are known, but some ancient Lithuanian texts from western regions show some Curonian influence. According to Lithuanian linguist Zigmas Zinkevičius, long and intense Curonian–Lithuanian bilingualism existed.

=== Onomastics ===
There are only few onomastics in the region considered to have been inhabited by the Curonians.

There are attested names of Curonian noblemen such as: Lammekinus, Veltūnas, Reiginas, Tvertikis, Saveidis.

=== Potential text in Curonian ===
Additionally, the Pater Noster reported by Simon Grunau is speculated to be in Curonian.

Lord's Prayer after Simon Grunau

Nossen thewes, cur tu es delbes
sweytz gischer tho wes wardes
penag munis tholbe mystlastilbi
tolpes prahes girkade delbeszisne tade symmes semmes worsunii
dodi mommys an nosse igdemas mayse
unde gaytkas pames mumys nusze noszeginu cademes pametam musen prettane kans
newede munis lawnā padomā swalbadi munis nowusse loyne Jhesus amen.

== See also ==
- Kursenieki language

== Literature ==
- Ambrassat, August "Die Provinz Ostpreußen", Frankfurt/ Main 1912
- Endzelin, J.: Über die Nationalität und Sprache der Kuren, in Finnisch-Ungarische Forschungen, XII, 1912
- Gaerte, Wilhelm "Urgeschichte Ostpreussens", Königsberg 1929
- Gimbutas, Marija "Die Balten", München-Berlin 1983
- Kurschat, Heinrich A.: Das Buch vom Memelland, Siebert Oldenburg 1968
- Kwauka, Paul, Pietsch, Richard: Kurisches Wörterbuch, Verlag Ulrich Camen Berlin, 1977, ISBN 3-921515-03-3
- Kwauka, Paul: Namen des Memellandes/ Unsere „fremdartigen“ Familiennamen, Archiv AdM, Oldenburg
- Lepa, Gerhard (Hrsg) "Die Schalauer", Tolkemita-Texte Dieburg 1997
- Mortensen, Hans und Gertrud "Die Besiedlung des nordöstlichen Ostpreußens bis zum Beginn des 17. Jahrhunderts", Leipzig 1938
- Mortensen, Hans und Gertrud: Kants väterliche Ahnen und ihre Umwelt, Rede von 1952 in Jahrbuch der Albertus-Universität zu Königsberg / Pr., Holzner- Verlag Kitzingen/ Main 1953 Bd. 3
- Peteraitis, Vilius: Mažoji Lietuva ir Tvanksta (Lithuania Minor and Tvanksta) Vilnius 1992
- Pietsch, Richard (künstlerischer Entwurf und Text): Bildkarte rund um das Kurische Haff, Heimat-Buchdienst Georg Banszerus, Höxter, Herstellung: Neue Stalling, Oldenburg
- Pietsch, Richard: Deutsch-Kurisches Wörterbuch, Verlag Nordostdeutsches Kulturwerk Lüneburg 1991, ISBN 3-922296-60-2
- Pietsch, Richard: Fischerleben auf der Kurischen Nehrung dargestellt in kurischer und deutscher Sprache, Verlag Ulrich Camen Berlin 1982
- Schmid, Wolfgang P. (Hrg): Nehrungskurisch, Sprachhistorische und instrumentalphonetische Studien zu einem aussterbenden Dialekt, Stuttgart 1989
- Schmid, Wolfgang P.: Das Nehrungskurische, ein sprachhistorischer Überblick
- Tolksdorf, Ulrich "Fischerei und Fischerkultur in Ostpreußen", Heide/ Holstein 1991
- Žadeikiene, Daiva, Krajinskas, Albertas: Kurenkahnwimpel, ISBN 9986-830-63-X
