= Balto-Slavic languages =

Branch of the Indo-European language family

Balto-Slavic
- Balto-Slavonic
- Geographic distribution: Northern Europe, Eastern Europe, Central Europe, Southeast Europe and Northern Asia
- Ethnicity: Balts and Slavs
- Native speakers: c. 322 million
- Linguistic classification: Indo-European: Balto-Slavic
- Early form: Proto-Indo-European
- Proto-language: Proto-Balto-Slavic
- Subdivisions: Slavic • East • South • West; Baltic • Dnieper-Oka † • East • West †

Language codes
- Glottolog: balt1263
- Countries where the national language is: Eastern Baltic Eastern Slavic Southern Slavic Western Slavic

The Balto-Slavic languages, less often known as the Balto-Slavonic languages, form a branch of the Indo-European language family, traditionally comprising the Baltic and Slavic languages. These languages share several linguistic traits not found in any other Indo-European branch, which points to a period of common development and origin.

A Proto-Balto-Slavic language is reconstructable by the comparative method, descending from Proto-Indo-European by means of well-defined sound laws, and from which modern Slavic and Baltic languages descended. One particularly innovative dialect separated from the Balto-Slavic dialect continuum and became ancestral to the Proto-Slavic language, from which all Slavic languages descended.

While the notion of a Balto-Slavic unity was previously contested largely due to political controversies, there is now a general consensus among academic specialists in Indo-European linguistics that Baltic and Slavic languages comprise a single branch of the Indo-European language family, with only some minor details of the nature of their relationship remaining in contention.

== Historical dispute ==
The nature of the relationship of the Balto-Slavic languages has been the subject of much discussion from the very beginning of historical Indo-European linguistics as a scientific discipline. A few are more intent on explaining the similarities between the two groups not in terms of a linguistically "genetic" relationship, but by language contact and dialectal closeness in the Proto-Indo-European period.

Various schematic sketches of possible alternative Balto-Slavic language relationships; Van Wijk, 1923

Baltic and Slavic share many close phonological, lexical, morphosyntactic and accentological similarities (listed below). The early Indo-Europeanists Rasmus Rask and August Schleicher (1861) postulated that Proto-Indo-European gave rise to a "Balto-Germanic-Slavic" language, from which both the Balto-Slavic branch (which later split into Proto-Baltic and Proto-Slavic) and the Germanic branch emerged. Schleicher's proposal was taken up and refined by Karl Brugmann, who listed eight innovations as evidence for a Balto-Slavic branch in the Grundriss der vergleichenden Grammatik der indogermanischen Sprachen ("Outline of the Comparative Grammar of the Indo-Germanic Languages"). The Latvian linguist Jānis Endzelīns thought, however, that any similarities among Baltic and Slavic languages resulted from intensive language contact, i.e. that they were not genetically more closely related and that there was no common Proto-Balto-Slavic language. Antoine Meillet (1905, 1908, 1922, 1925, 1934), a French linguist, in reaction to Brugmann's hypothesis, propounded a view according to which all similarities of Baltic and Slavic occurred accidentally, by independent parallel development, and that there was no Proto-Balto-Slavic language. In turn, the Polish linguist Rozwadowski suggests that the similarities among Baltic and Slavic languages are a result of both a genetic relationship and later language contact. Thomas Olander corroborates the claim of genetic relationship in his research in the field of comparative Balto-Slavic accentology.

Even though some linguists still reject a genetic relationship, most scholars accept that Baltic and Slavic languages experienced a period of common development. This view is also reflected in most modern standard textbooks on Indo-European linguistics. Gray and Atkinson's (2003) application of language-tree divergence analysis supports a genetic relationship between the Baltic and Slavic languages, dating the split of the family to about 1400 BCE.

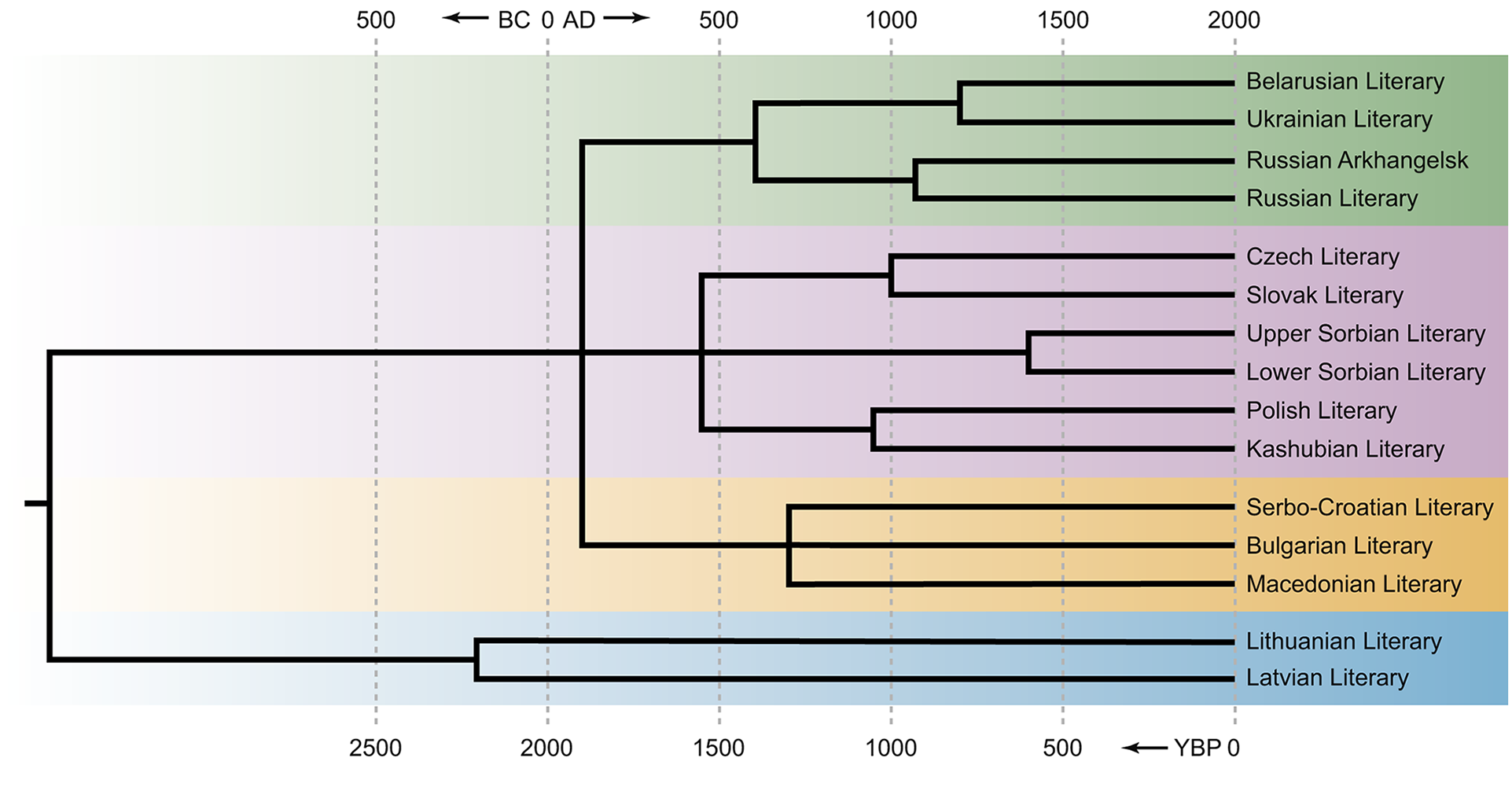
Tree of Balto-Slavic languages

== Internal classification ==
The traditional division into two distinct sub-branches (i.e. Slavic and Baltic) is mostly upheld by scholars who accept Balto-Slavic as a genetic branch of Indo-European. There is a general consensus that the Baltic languages can be divided into East Baltic (Lithuanian, Latvian) and West Baltic (Old Prussian). The internal diversity of Baltic points at a much greater time-depth for the breakup of the Baltic languages in comparison to the Slavic languages.

"Traditional" Balto-Slavic tree model

- Balto‑Slavic
  - Baltic
    - West Baltic
    - East Baltic
  - Slavic

This bipartite division into Baltic and Slavic was first challenged in the 1960s, when Vladimir Toporov and Vyacheslav Ivanov observed that the apparent difference between the "structural models" of the Baltic languages and the Slavic languages is the result of the innovative nature of Proto-Slavic, and that the latter had evolved from an earlier stage which conformed to the more archaic "structural model" of the Proto-Baltic dialect continuum. Frederik Kortlandt (1977, 2018) has proposed that West Baltic and East Baltic are in fact not more closely related to each other than either of them is related to Slavic, and Balto-Slavic therefore can be split into three equidistant branches: East Baltic, West Baltic and Slavic.

Alternative Balto-Slavic tree model

- Balto‑Slavic
  - West Baltic
  - East Baltic
  - Slavic

Kortlandt's hypothesis is supported by a number of scholars. Some scholars accept Kortlandt's division into three branches as the default assumption, but believe that there is sufficient evidence to unite East Baltic and West Baltic in an intermediate Baltic node.

The tripartite split is supported by glottochronologic studies by V. V. Kromer, whereas two computer-generated family trees (from the early 2000s) that include Old Prussian have a Baltic node parallel to the Slavic node.

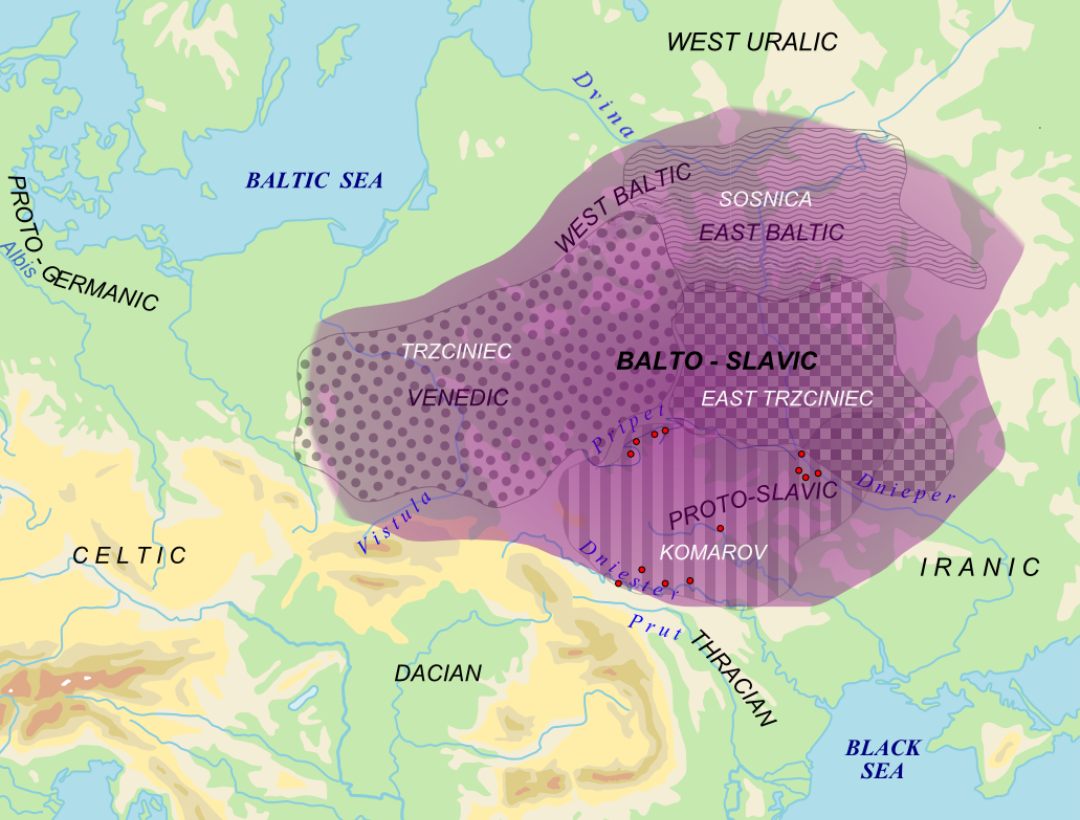
Area of Balto-Slavic dialect continuum (purple), with proposed material cultures correlating to speakers of Balto-Slavic in the Bronze Age (white); including archaic Slavic hydronyms (red dots).

== Historical expansion ==
The sudden expansion of Proto-Slavic in the sixth and the seventh century (around 600 CE, uniform Proto-Slavic with minor dialectal differentiation was spoken from Thessaloniki in Greece to Novgorod in Russia) is, according to some, connected to the hypothesis that Proto-Slavic was in fact a koiné of the Avar state, i.e. the language of the administration and military rule of the Avar Khaganate in Eastern Europe. In 626, the Slavs, Persians and Avars jointly attacked the Byzantine Empire and participated in the Siege of Constantinople. In that campaign, the Slavs fought under Avar officers. There is an ongoing controversy over whether the Slavs might then have been a military caste under the khaganate rather than an ethnicity. Their language—at first possibly only one local speech—once koinéized, became a lingua franca of the Avar state. This might explain how Proto-Slavic spread to the Balkans and the areas of the Danube basin, and would also explain why the Avars were assimilated so fast, leaving practically no linguistic traces, and that Proto-Slavic was so unusually uniform. However, such a theory fails to explain how Slavic spread to Eastern Europe, an area that had no historical links with the Avar Khanate. That said, the Avar state was later replaced by the definitively Slavic state of Great Moravia, which could have played the same role.

It is also likely that the expansion of Slavic occurred with the assimilation of Iranic-speaking groups such as the Sarmatians, who quickly adopted Proto-Slavic due to speaking related Indo-European satem languages, in much the same way Latin expanded by assimilating the Celtic speakers in continental Western Europe and the Dacians.

That sudden expansion of Proto-Slavic erased most of the idioms of the Balto-Slavic dialect continuum, which left us today with only two groups, Baltic and Slavic (or East Baltic, West Baltic, and Slavic in the minority view). This secession of the Balto-Slavic dialect ancestral to Proto-Slavic is estimated on archaeological and glottochronological criteria to have occurred sometime in the period 1500–1000 BCE. Hydronymic evidence suggests that Baltic languages were once spoken in much wider territory than the one they cover today, all the way to Moscow, and were later replaced by Slavic.

== Shared features of the Balto-Slavic languages ==
The degree of relationship of the Baltic and Slavic languages is indicated by a series of common innovations not shared with other Indo-European languages, and by the relative chronology of these innovations which can be established. The Baltic and Slavic languages also share some inherited words. These are either not found at all in other Indo-European languages (except when borrowed) or are inherited from Proto-Indo-European but have undergone identical changes in meaning when compared to other Indo-European languages. This indicates that the Baltic and Slavic languages share a period of common development, the Proto-Balto-Slavic language.

=== Common sound changes ===
==== Segmental changes ====
In its early stage, Balto-Slavic languages share two notable sound changes with some other Indo-European branches. They are therefore not direct evidence for the existence of a common Balto-Slavic family, but they do corroborate it.

- Satemization: The PIE palatovelar consonants *ḱ, *ǵ, *ǵʰ become palatal sibilants *ś, *ź, *ź, while the PIE labiovelar consonants *kʷ, *gʷ, *gʷʰ lose their labialization and merge with the plain velar *k, *g, *gʰ. The palatal sibilants later become plain sibilants *s, *z in all Balto-Slavic languages except Lithuanian.
- Ruki sound law: *s becomes *š when preceded by *r, *u, *k, *g, *gʰ or *i. In Slavic, this *š later becomes *x (variously spelled ⟨ch⟩, ⟨h⟩ or ⟨х⟩ in the Slavic languages) when followed by a back vowel.

The following list of sound changes are generally unique to Balto-Slavic, with exceptions specified.

- Winter's law: lengthening of vowels before Proto-Indo-European (PIE) non-breathy voiced consonants (*b, *d, *g).
- PIE breathy-voiced consonants (*bʰ, *dʰ, *gʰ, *ǵʰ) merge into plain voiced consonants (*b, *d, *g, *ǵ). This also occurred in several other Indo-European branches, but as Winter's law was sensitive to the difference between the two types of consonants, the merger must have happened after it and so is a specific Balto-Slavic innovation.
- Hirt's law: retraction of the PIE accent to the preceding syllable, if that syllable ended in a laryngeal (*h₁, *h₂, *h₃, see Laryngeal theory).
- A high vowel is inserted before PIE syllabic sonorants (*l̥, *r̥, *m̥, *n̥). This vowel is usually *i (giving *il, *ir, *im, *in) but in some occasions also *u (*ul, *ur, *um, *un). Proto-Germanic is the only other Indo-European language that inserts a high vowel (*u in all cases), all others insert mid or low vowels instead.
- Emergence of a register distinction on long syllables, between acute (probably glottalized) and circumflex. The acute arose primarily when the syllable ended in a PIE voiced consonant (as in Winter's law) or when it ended in a laryngeal. The distinction is reflected in most Balto-Slavic languages, including Proto-Slavic, as an opposition between rising and falling tone on accented syllables. Some Baltic languages directly reflect the acute register in the form of a so-called "broken tone".
- Shortening of vowels before word-final *m.
- Word-final *-mi > *-m after a long vowel. This followed the preceding change, as the preceding long vowel is retained.
- Raising of stressed *o to *u in a final syllable.
- Merging of PIE short *o and *a into *a. This change also occurred in several other Indo-European branches, but here too it must have happened after Winter's law: Winter's law lengthens *o to *ō and *a to *ā, and must therefore have occurred before the two sounds merged. It also followed the raising of *o to *u above. In the Slavic languages, *a is later rounded to *o, while the Baltic languages keep *a:
  - Lithuanian ašìs Old Church Slavonic ось (from PIE *a: Latin axis, Ancient Greek áxōn)
  - Lithuanian avìs, Old Church Slavonic овьца (from PIE *o: Latin ovis, Greece óis)

==== Accentual changes ====
Balto-Slavic also innovated a new accent system whose stress assignment patterns bear virtually no resemblance to the original Proto-Indo-European accent system that can be reconstructed from Greek and Sanskrit evidence. This innovation is visible in both nouns and verbs.

Disyllabic nouns' declensions became grouped into two accent paradigms, namely fixed (with the stress consistently on the root) and mobile (with stress moving between the root and the endings). Unlike in Greek and Sanskrit, where these nouns generally had mostly fixed accent position, many thematic o-stem and a-stem nouns ended up with mobile accent in Balto-Slavic. The developments of the two nominal accent paradigms in Balto-Slavic are given by Villanueva Svensson as follows:

Balto-Slavic noun accent pattern (AP) correspondences
Proto-Balto-Slavic	Root syllable type	Baltic		Slavic
Proto-Balto-Slavic	Root syllable type	Lithuanian	Latvian	Slavic
Fixed	Non-acute	AP 2	Falling tone	AP b
Fixed	Acute	AP 1	Even tone	AP a
Mobile	Non-acute	AP 4	Falling tone	AP c
Mobile	Acute	AP 3	Broken tone	AP c

Note that while Latvian has fixed initial-syllable stress, the tone of that stressed syllable does exhibit correspondences with accent patterns outside of Latvian.

=== Common grammatical innovations ===
- Replacement of the original PIE genitive singular ending of thematic (o-stem) nouns, which is reconstructed as *-osyo, with the ablative ending *-ād (Proto-Slavic *vьlka, Lithuanian vil̃ko, Latvian vilka). Old Prussian, however, has another ending, perhaps stemming from the original PIE genitive: deiwas "god's", tawas "father's".
- Use of the ending *-ān (from earlier *-āmi) of the instrumental singular in ā-stem nouns and adjectives. This contrasts with Sanskrit -ayā, archaic Vedic -ā. Lithuanian rankà is ambiguous and could have originated from either ending, but the correspondence with East Lithuanian runku and Latvian rùoku point to Balto-Slavic *-ān.
- Use of the ending *-mis in the instrumental plural, e.g. Lithuanian sūnumìs, Old Church Slavonic synъmi "with sons". This ending is also found in Germanic, while the other Indo-European languages have an ending with -bʰ-, as in Sanskrit -bhis.
- Creation of a distinction between definite (meaning similar to "the") and indefinite adjectives (meaning similar to "a"). The definite forms were formed by attaching the corresponding form of the relative/demonstrative pronoun *jas to the end of the adjective. For example, Lithuanian geràsis 'the good' as opposed to gẽras 'good', Old Church Slavonic dobrъjь 'the good' as opposed to dobrъ 'good'. However, in 1984, Baltic linguist Zinkevičius argued that these forms in Lithuanian are developed after the split, since in older Lithuanian literature (16th century and onwards) they had not yet merged (e.g. naujamę́jame ʽin the new one' from *naujamén + *jamén). In Lithuanian, the pronoun merged with the adjective having a modern (secondary) pronominal inflection; in Slavic, the pronoun merged with an adjective, having an ancient (primary) nominal inflection.
- Usage of the genitive case for the direct object of a negative verb. For example, Russian кни́ги (я) не читал, Lith. knygos neskaičiau 'I haven't read the book'.

=== Shared vocabulary ===
Some examples of words shared among most or all Balto-Slavic languages:

- *léiˀpāˀ 'tilia' (linden tree): Lithuanian líepa, Old Prussian līpa, Latvian liẽpa, Latgalian līpa, Common Slavic *lipa (Old Church Slavonic липа, Russian ли́па, Polish lipa, Czech lípa)
- *ránkāˀ 'hand': Lithuanian rankà, Old Prussian rānkan (acc. sg.), Latvian rùoka, Latgalian rūka, Common Slavic *rǭkà (Old Church Slavonic рѫка, Russian рука́, Polish ręka, Czech ruka)
- *galˀwā́ˀ 'head': Lithuanian galvà, Old Prussian galwo, Latvian gal̂va, Latgalian golva; Common Slavic *golvà (Old Church Slavonic глава, Russian голова́, Polish głowa, Czech hlava, Slavic Triglav 'three-headed/three-faced' god).

Despite lexical developments exclusive to Balto-Slavic and otherwise showing evidence for a stage of common development, there are considerable differences between the vocabularies of Baltic and Slavic. Rozwadowski noted that every semantic field contains core vocabulary that is etymologically different between the two branches. Andersen prefers a dialect continuum model where the northernmost dialects developed into Baltic and the southernmost dialects into Slavic (with Slavic later absorbing any intermediate idioms during its expansion). Andersen thinks that different neighboring and substratum languages might have contributed to the differences in basic vocabulary.

== See also ==
- Corded Ware culture
- International Workshop on Balto-Slavic Accentology
- List of Balto-Slavic languages
- Outline of Slavic history and culture
