= Selonian =

Selonian may refer to:

- Selonians, an extinct tribe of Balts
- Selonian language, the language spoken by the Baltic Selonian people
- Selonian (Star Wars), an alien race in Star Wars

== See also ==
- Selonia, a cultural region of Latvia
