= Likteņdārzs =

Landscape ensemble in Koknese, Latvia

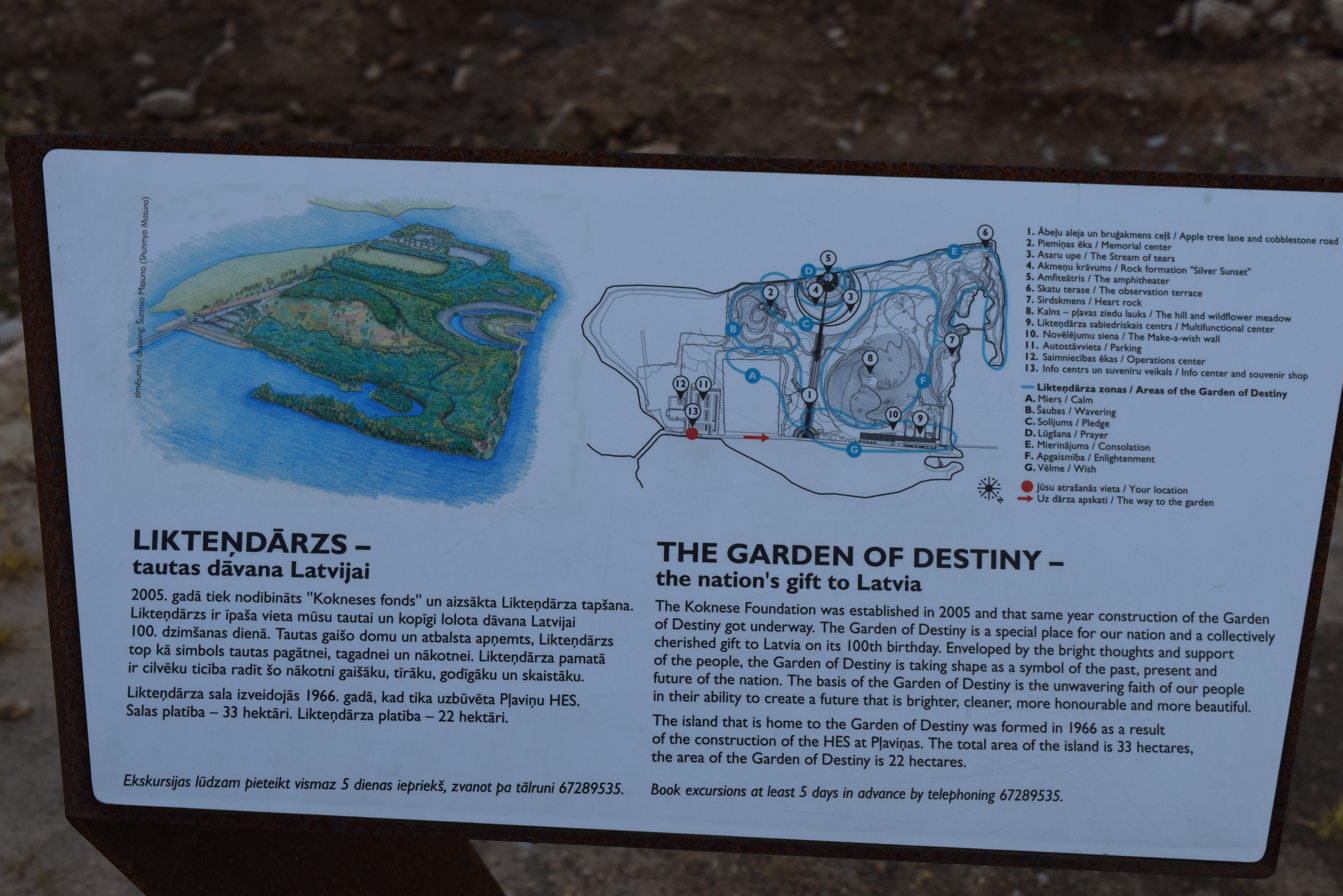
- Map of Likteņdārzs
- Interactive map of Likteņdārzs
- Location: Koknese, Latvia
- Coordinates: 56.6363°N 25.438°E
- Area: 21 hectares (52 acres)
- Created: 2005
- Designer: Shunmyō Masuno
- Etymology: Garden of Destiny
- Terrain: Island
- Website: www.liktendarzs.lv

Likteņdārzs (translated as Garden of Destiny from Latvian) is a monumental landscape ensemble in Koknese, Latvia.

It is located near the Koknese Castle ruins on an island of Daugava, which formed during the construction of the reservoir for the Pļaviņas Hydroelectric Power Station in 1966 due to water level rising by about 20 meters. The construction of the Garden of Destiny started in 2005 supervised by the Koknese Foundation set up the same year. It spans 21 hectares.

== Design ==
It was designed by the Japanese landscape architect Shunmyō Masuno. The implementation is overseen by architect Andris Kronbergs and the architectural company ARHIS Arhitekti. According to Masuno's design, the direction of the main alley coincides with the sunset direction on the day of the establishment of the Republic of Latvia, November 18.

Likteņdarzs is also a place of remembrance for the victims of the Soviet occupation of Latvia in 1940 and the German occupation of Latvia during World War II. The inner walls of the circular memorial building display the names of the hundreds of thousands of Latvians perished and subbefer during repeated occupations.

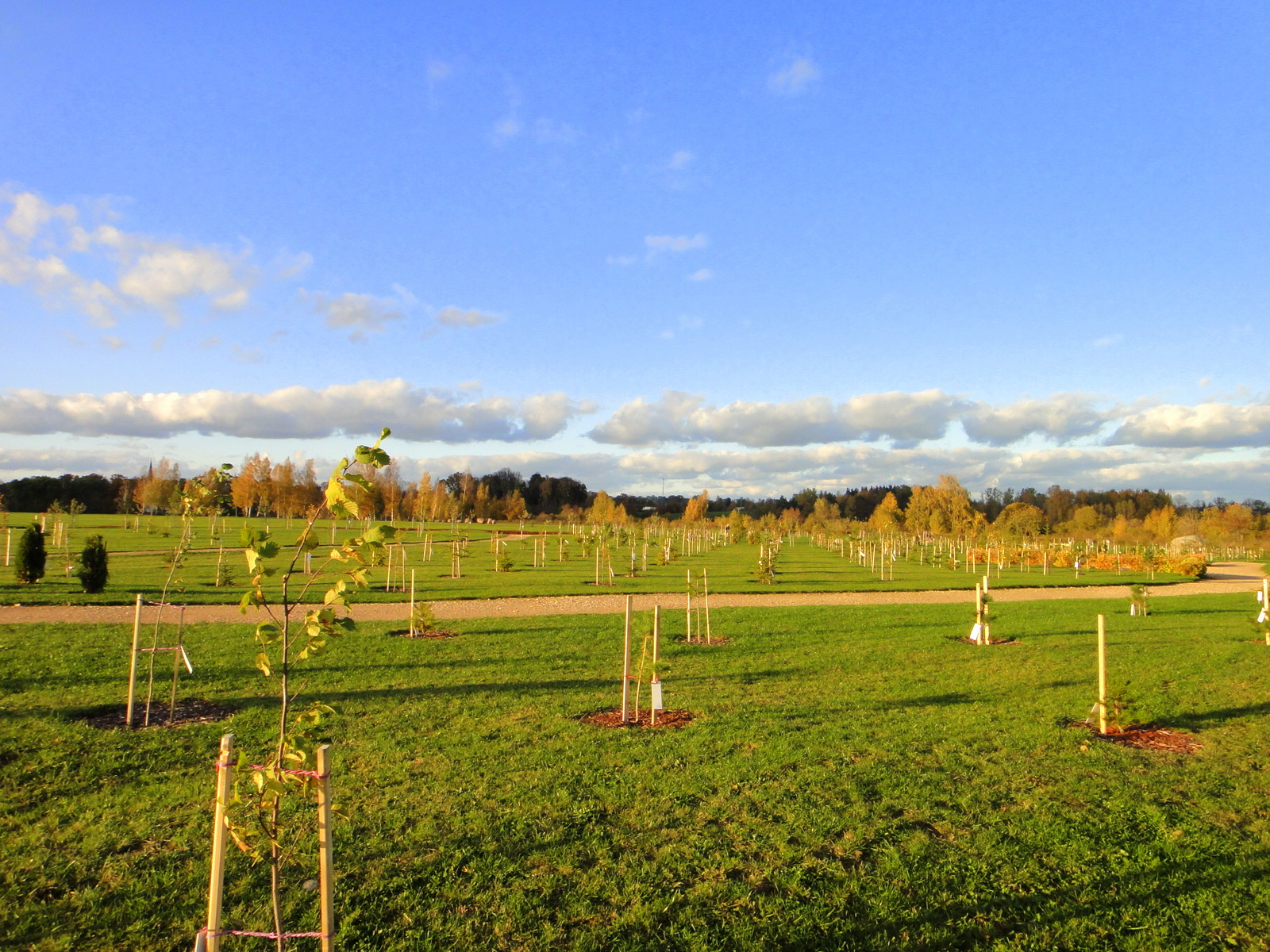
A part of Likteņdārzs, 2011

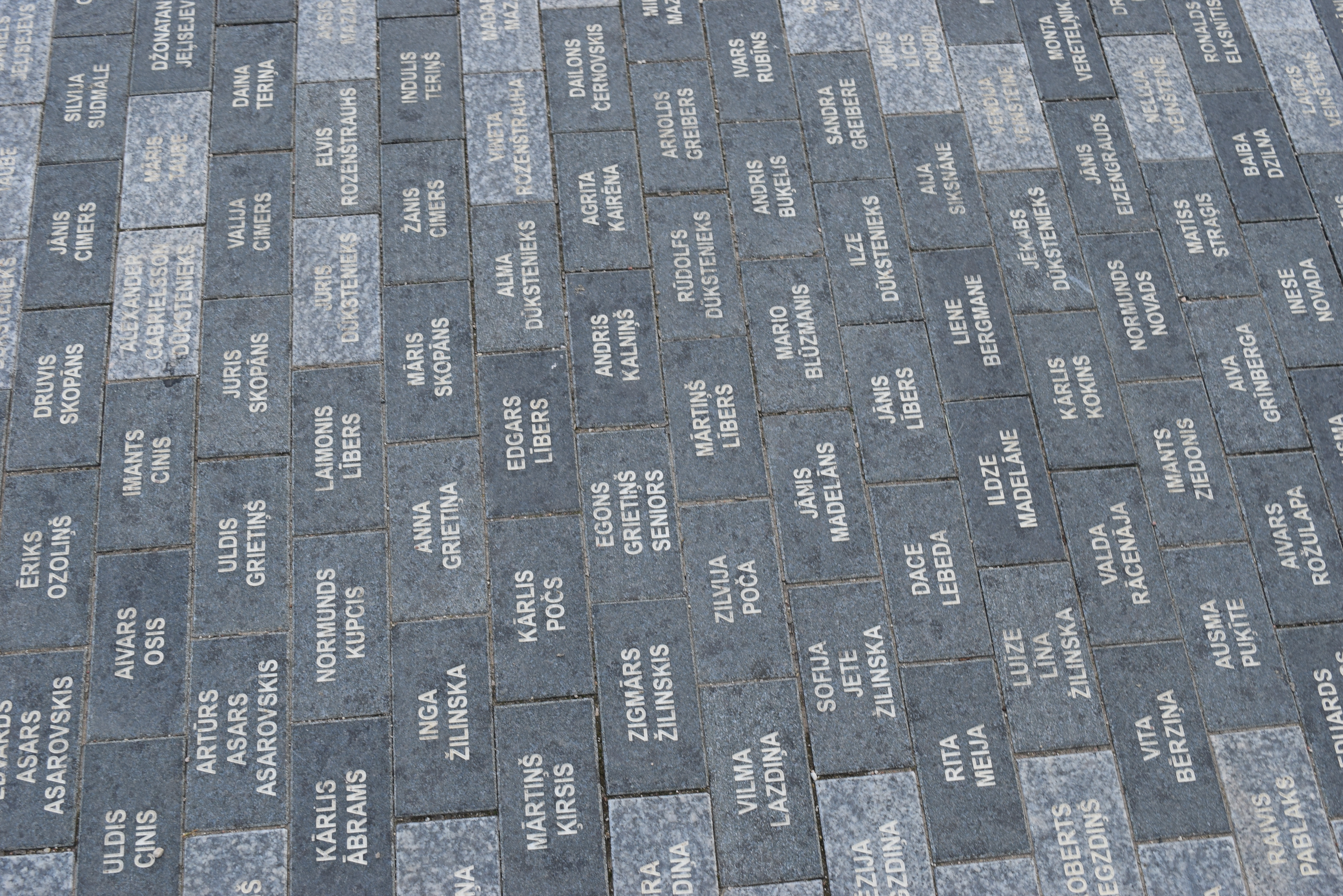
Names on the Alley of Friends
