= Siege of Tartu (1224) =

Part of the Livonian Crusade in Estonia

- Part of the Livonian Crusade
Date	15 August 1224
Location	Tartu, Estonia 58°22′48″N 26°43′21″E
Result	Livonian victory

Belligerents
Estonians; Novgorodians	Sword-Brothers; Livs; Letts

Commanders and leaders
Vyachko of Koknese †	Unknown

Strength
Unknown	Unknown

Casualties and losses
Heavy casualties	Heavy casualties

The siege of Tartu, or Dorpat, took place in 1224 and resulted in the fall of the last major center of Estonian resistance in the mainland provinces to the Christian conquest of Estonia.

== Background ==
In 1208, the Livonian Brothers of the Sword launched a crusade against the pagan Estonians, who had been raiding into the Latgalian and Livonian territories to the south which had recently been conquered by the Order. In 1219, Denmark joined the crusade, and in 1220, so did Sweden. The Estonians were able to annihilate the Swedish presence, but by the winter of 1220 nearly all of continental Estonia had been conquered by the Germans and Danes, and the population declared Christian.

Several Russian princes from Pskov and Novgorod also launched incursions into Livonia, and following the deterioration of relations between the Livonians and Pskov, the Russians began to treat some of the neighbouring counties, including Ugaunia, Sakala and others, as territories subject to their rule.

== Uprising of 1223 ==
In 1223, there was a general anti-Christian uprising in the subjugated continental part of Estonia. All Germans and Danes who fell into the hands of the Estonians were put to the sword, and some of the priests ritually sacrificed to pagan gods. The Estonians reoccupied all the fortresses after the German garrisons had been killed. In order to secure the initial military success, mercenary Russian troops were invited from Novgorod and Pskov and stationed in several key fortresses, such as Viljandi and Tartu. The identities of the Estonian leadership in Tartu is not known. The commander of the Russian mercenaries was Vyachko, who in 1208 had lost his dominion in Koknese to the combined forces of the Sword Brethren and Livonians. He was given two hundred men and money by the Novgorod Republic so that he could establish himself in Tarbatu (present-day Tartu), or any other place "that he could conquer for himself".

== First siege of Tartu ==
In the winter of 1223–1224, the Germans gradually managed to reconquer most strongholds in mainland Estonia. Tartu remained the last center of resistance in South-Estonia. In addition to the local population from Ugandi, many diehard freedom fighters had gathered there from Sakala and other neighboring provinces (vicinas omnes provincias). The crusaders laid siege to Tartu after Easter in 1224, but were forced to leave after only five days of fighting. The bishops sent a delegation to Vyachko and asked him to give up the "heathen rebels" in the fortress and leave them, but he chose to stay because the "Novgorodians and Russian princes had promised him the fortress and the surrounding lands" if he could conquer them for himself.

== Second siege of Tartu ==
On 15 August 1224 the crusader army, reinforced with a large number of Christian Latvian and Livonian troops, returned in force to Tarbatu. The second siege of Tartu of 1224 lasted many days and nights. Vyachko and his 200 Christian Russians were again offered free passage through the crusader camp, but Vyachko, expecting a relief army from Novgorod, refused.

The siege began with the building of larger and smaller bricoles, which were used to throw rocks and "hot iron" or fire-pots into the stronghold. The Christian army constructed a high turret which was gradually moved closer to the stronghold. The Germans constantly undermined the wall and gathered wood which was lit to set the stronghold aflame. The defenders used their own bricoles and fired upon the Germans with bows and crossbows. At night the fighting didn't stop either: the combatants shouted at one another, and made noise with their swords, playing drums, fifes and horns.

Eventually the Germans launched an all-out attack on the stronghold. All the defenders of Tarbatu, including women, were killed in the final onslaught by the Knights. In total nearly a thousand Estonians lost their lives in the final battle. According to the Chronicle of Henry of Livonia, Vyachko along with his Russians tried to put up a separate resistance in one of the fortifications, but were all dragged out and killed. Of all the defenders of Tarbatu, only one Russian from Suzdal was left alive. He was given clothes and a good horse and sent back to Novgorod. The relief troops from Novgorod had reached Pskov when they received the news from Tartu, whereupon they decided to cancel the expedition and make peace with the Germans.

== Aftermath ==
With the fall of Tartu, the entire Estonian mainland had been conquered by the Livonian Brothers of the Sword. For the time being, only the main islands of Estonia were able to preserve their independence. The conquest also meant that the Russians had lost their last foothold in Estonia.

== Sources ==
- Murray, Alan V. (5 July 2017). Crusade and Conversion on the Baltic Frontier 1150–1500. Taylor & Francis. ISBN 978-1-351-94715-2.
