= Koknese Castle =

Castle ruins in Latvia

- Kokneses pils
- Vidzeme, Koknese municipality, Latvia; Near Koknese
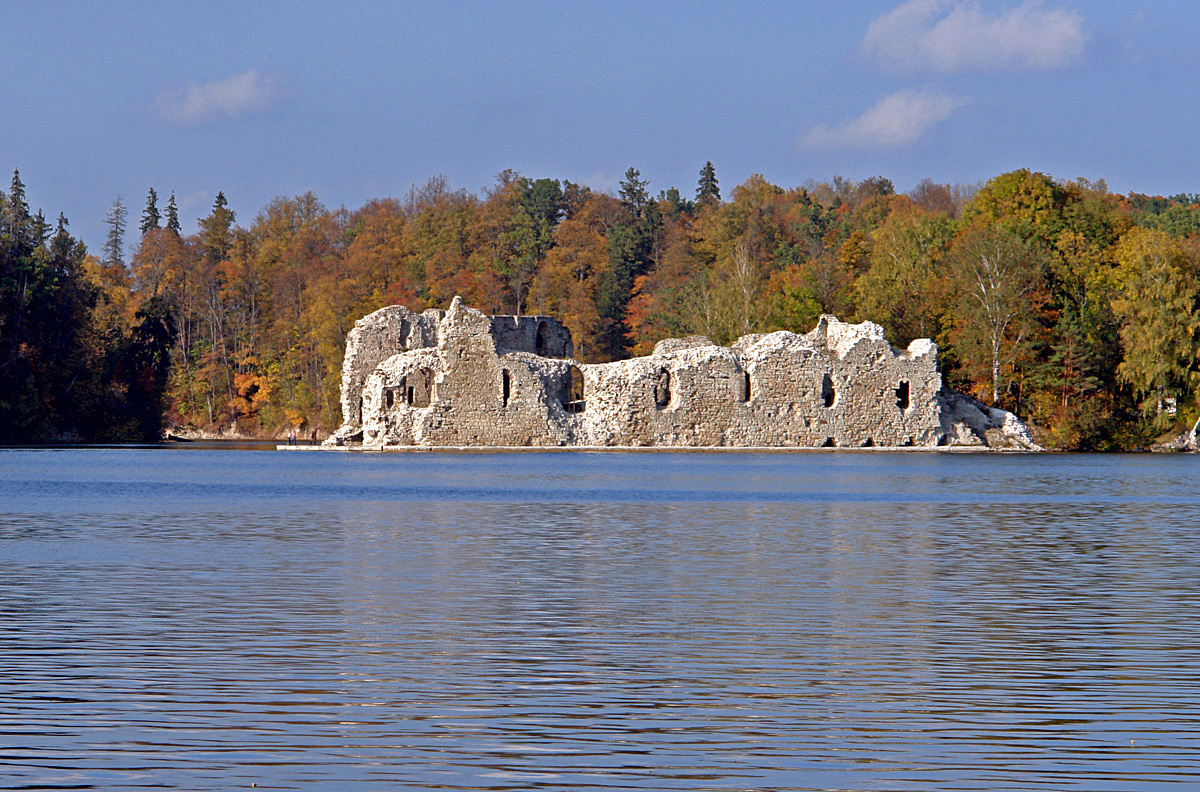
- Ruins of the Koknese castle in 2007

Site information
- Type: Castle
- Owner: Municipal, state
- Open to the public: Yes
- Condition: Ruins

Location
- Coordinates: 56°38′17″N 25°25′3″E

Site history
- Built: 1209
- Built by: Albert of Riga
- In use: 491–492 years
- Materials: Lime-gravel mortar bricks, light grey dolomite
- Fate: Demolished in 1701
- Battles/wars: Battle of Kokenhausen (1601); Northern War of 1655–1660; Great Northern War (1701)

Koknese Castle (Latvian: Kokneses pils, German: Burg Kokenhusen) is a complex in Koknese, in the Vidzeme region of Latvia, dating from the 13th century. The castle was situated on a high bluff overlooking the Daugava river valley. In 1965 a hydroelectric dam was built downriver, creating a water reservoir that partially submerged the castle and flooded the surrounding valley.

The castle was heavily contested between Polish, Swedish and Russian forces in the 16th and 17th centuries. It changed hands many times, while the native inhabitants endured periodic slaughter, capture, and famine. In 1701, during the Great Northern War, Koknese was blown up by retreating forces to avoid the strategic castle falling into advancing Russian hands.

== History ==
Before the arrival of the Teutonic Knights, Koknese was the site of a wooden hill fort inhabited by the Balts until 1208, when Vyachko, prince of Koknese, burned down the castle. In 1209 Bishop Albert of Riga ordered the construction of a stone castle at the site, naming it Kokenhusen. For the first 50 years of its existence, Koknese was solely used as a defensive fort, but by 1277, Koknese had enough population to receive city rights. Koknese also became a member of the Hanseatic League thanks to its strategic location on the Daugava trade route.

After 1582, in the peace treaty of Yam-Zapolsky, it was named the citadel of Koknese Castle (Latin: arx Kokenhausen, Russian: Кокенгаузен). After the end of the Livonian War, Koknese Castle County became a part of the Wenden Voivodeship.

During the Polish-Swedish War in 1601, Swedish troops unsuccessfully attempted to take Koknese Castle, and only succeeded in 1621. The castle was extensively rebuilt and strengthened and in 1636 Koknese was proclaimed a town of the Swedish Livonia County along with Riga, Pärnu and Tartu. In 1656, during the Second Northern War, the castle was captured by the Russian Tsarist troops and central warehouses for Russian exports began to be built around the castle. In 1661, the Swedes regained control of the castle. At the beginning of the Great Northern War, on 17 October 1700, the castle was captured by Saxon troops. On 25 July 1701, the Saxon Colonel Bose ordered the two western towers of the castle to be blown up - and the castle has been unoccupied ever since.

The castle was never rebuilt after the Saxons' scorched earth demolition and laid unattended for 200 years before being turned into a tourist attraction by the Soviet Union.

The town around Koknese began to reappear in the 19th century, after serfdom was abolished and a railroad station was built in the village, facilitating movement to the area. In 1900, a park was established around the castle ruins, and Koknese became a popular summer resort. The area was known for its scenic waterfalls, cliffs, and look-outs. In 1965, the Soviet government built Pļaviņas Hydro Power Plant in the town of Aizkraukle. The reservoir flooded the entire length of the Daugava to Pļaviņas. Koknese Castle, once sitting atop a high bluff, was placed at the river's edge, while the scenic Daugava valley was submerged.

== Bailiffs (Vogt) of Koknese (Kokenhusen) ==
Bailiffs (Vogt) of Koknese (Kokenhusen):

- 1295–1312? Johann von Tiesenhausen
- 1340–1342 Woldemar de Wrangel
- 1363 Otto de Rosen
- 1371 Luderus de Stederen
- 1382–1385 Henricus Kruze
- 1417–1426 Georg Gudesleff
- 1428–1434 Odert Orges
- 1436–1437 Otto von Rosen
- 1444 Laurencies
- 1460–1461 Rodolph Persevall
- 1469 Jakob Koskull
- 1473 Robrecht Czeszwegen
- 1477 Jurgen Curszel
- 1479 Andreas von Rosen
- 1493 Hans Ninegal
- 1497–1506 Gert Linde
- 1507–1523 Friedrich von der Broele gen. Plater
- 1528–1545 Godert von Neilen
- 1548–1549 Georg Gartmann
- 1552–1556 Gert von Medem

== Summary ==
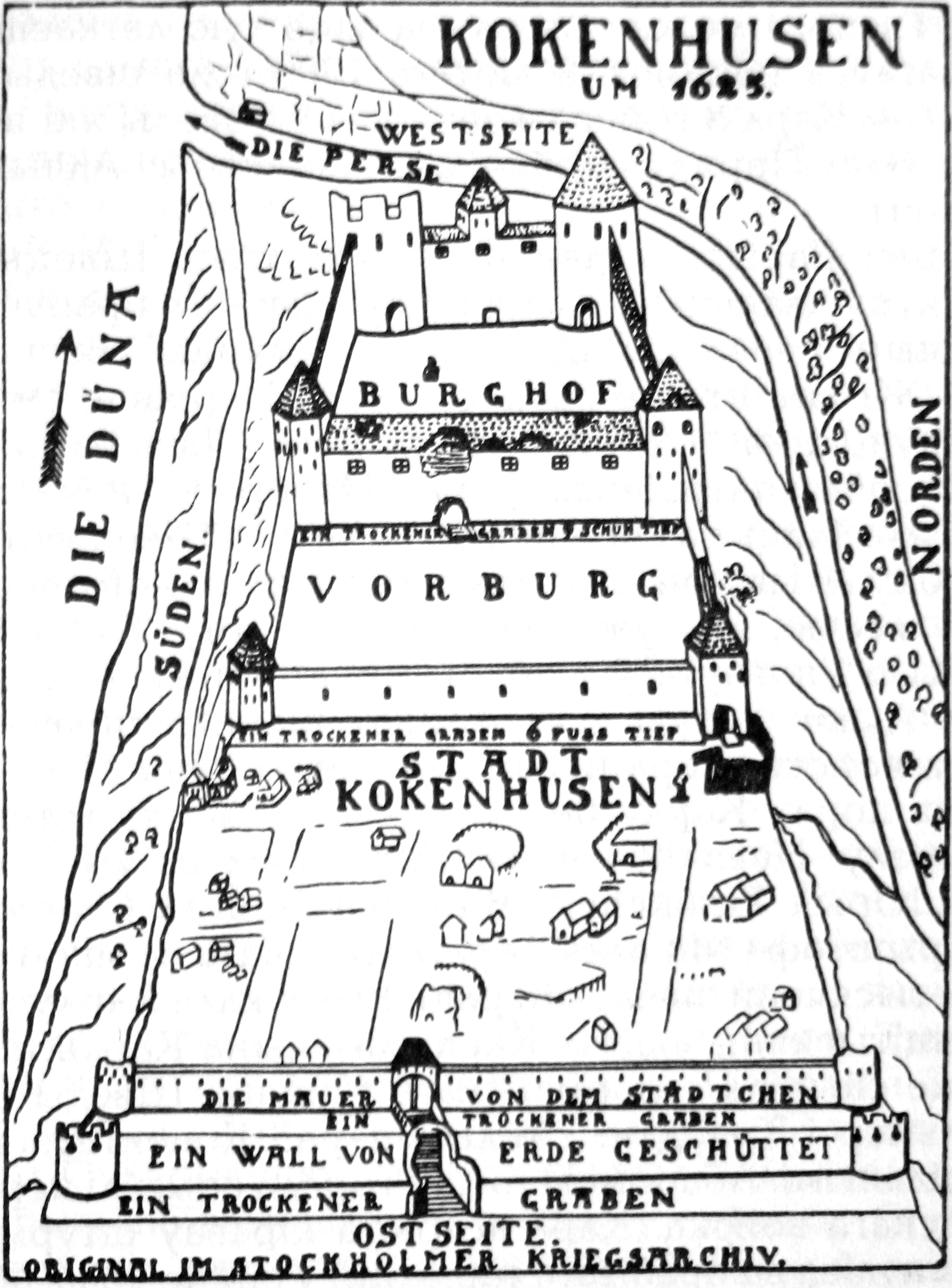
Koknese fortress and town during the Swedish Livonia period (1625)

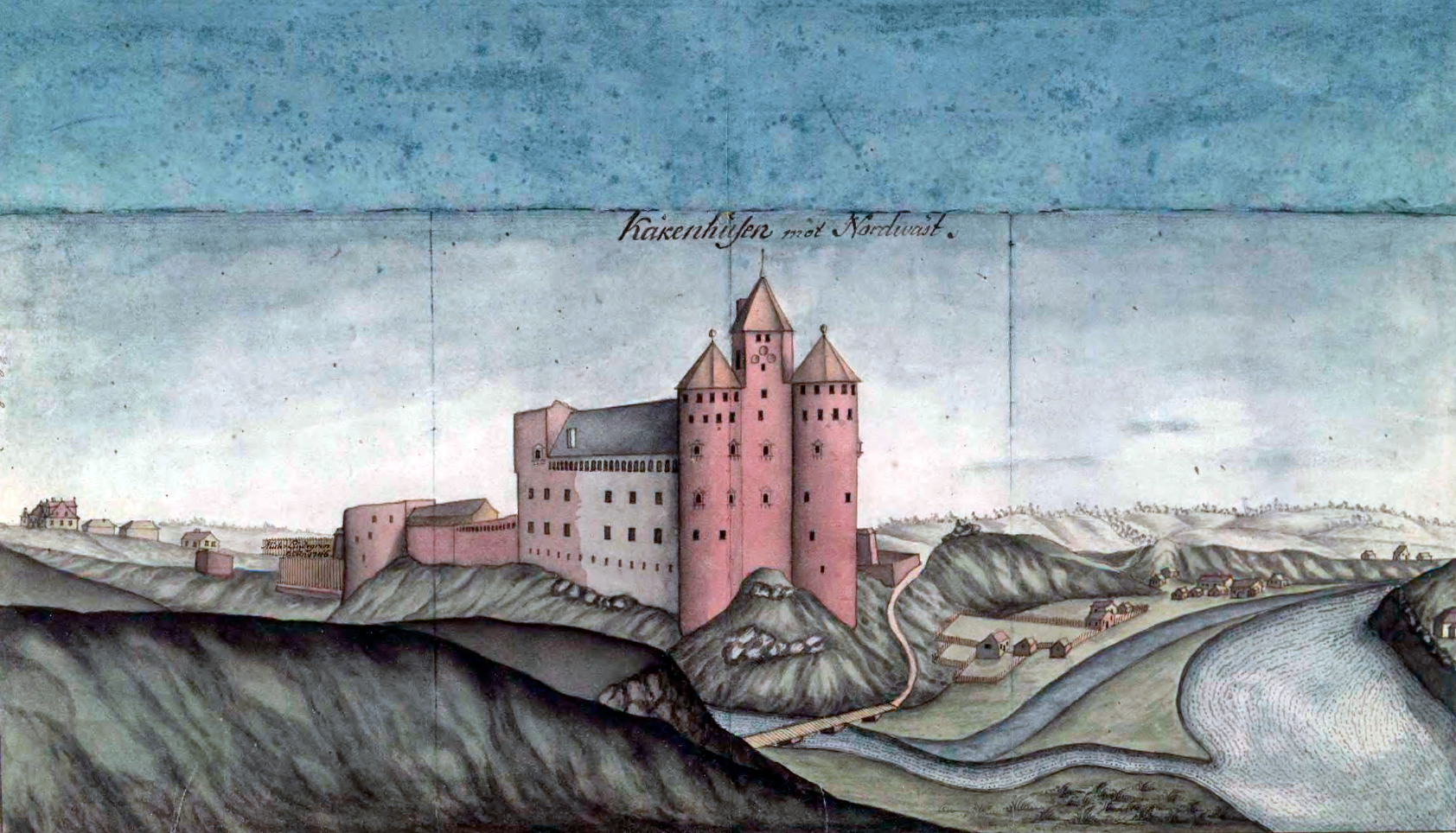
Castle from northwest in the 17th century

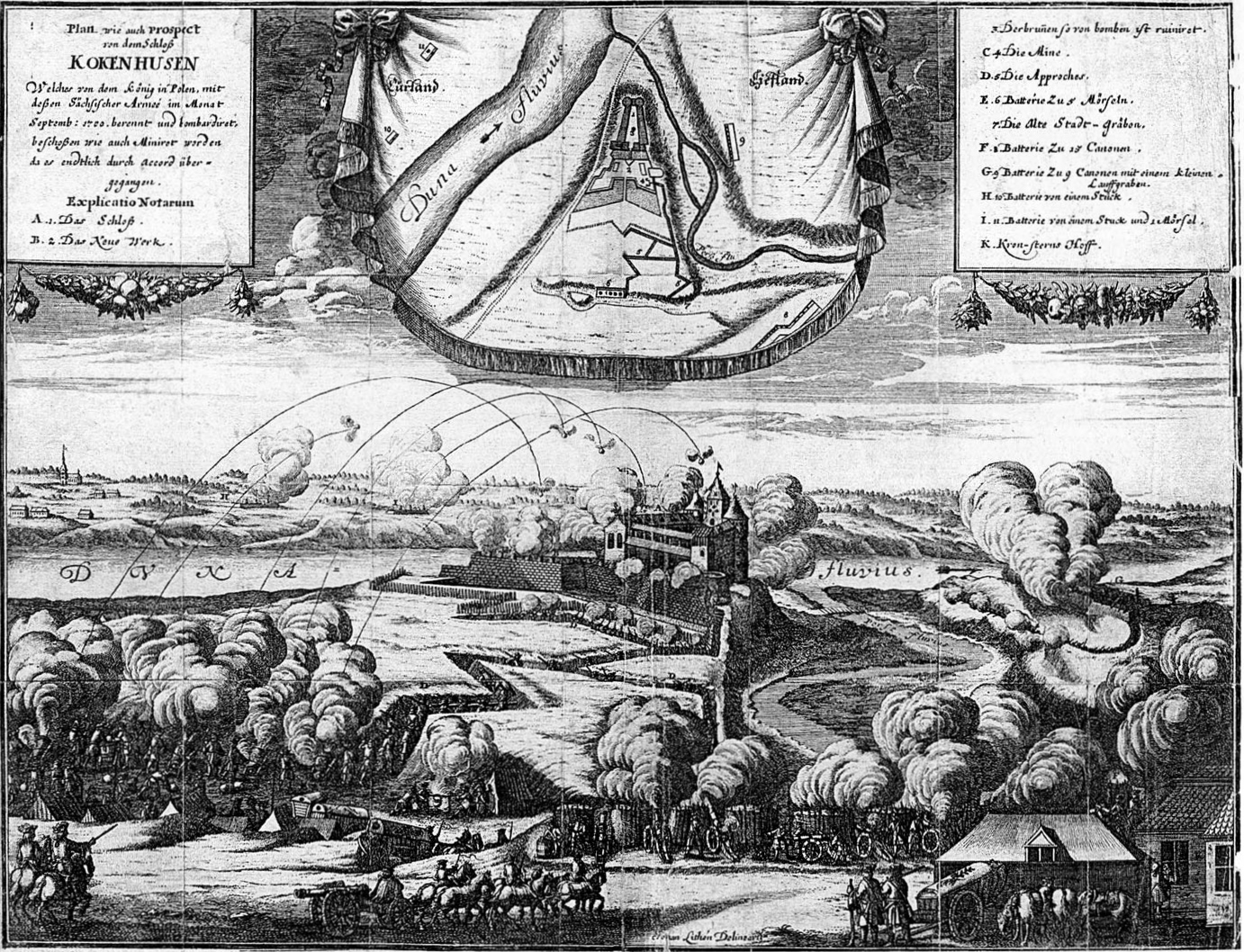
Siege and bombardment of Koknese Castle in 1700

By the end of the 13th century, the territory of the Archbishopric of Riga, like that of the other bishoprics of Livonia, had become stable. For nearly three centuries, the Archbishop, along with his cathedral chapter, governed the approximately 400 square kilometer territory. As a secular lord, the Archbishop had the authority to manage the land reserves, establish towns, and mint currency, among other things.

The representative of the Archbishop in a secular trial was the bailiff or land-bailiff ((Latin: advocatus, German: voget, Stiftvogt, Landvogt etc.). Generally, land-bailiffs were administrators who collected taxes, claimed duties, and administered the law in a specific territory under the authorization of the spiritual territorial Lord Archbishop of Riga. They were responsible for concluding agreements and organizing the defense of the land. Additionally, they were required for the construction and reconstruction of the Archbishop's castles. Bailiffs were vassals, appointed for a certain period.

In the Archbishopric of Riga, there were multiple bailiffs simultaneously working in their respective administrative territories. The territorial changes in the administrative districts of the Riga bishopric between 1201 and 1253/1255 document the organization of land administration in areas inhabited by Livonians, starting from 1207. Initially, the boundaries of administrative districts were based on pre-existing territorial divisions established before the conquest of crusaders. As new castles were constructed, they became the administrative centers. During the 13th to 15th centuries, the bailiffs' districts in Ydumea and Lielvārde (Lenewarden) ceased to exist. However, for a brief period in the 15th century, Rauna (Ronneburg) emerged as a bailiwick.

The stone castle of Turaida (also known as Treyden, Thoreida, and built in 1214) maintained its position as the center of the bailiwick for an extended period until the secularization of the Archbishopric in 1566. The origins of the Turaida bailiwick can be traced back to the early 13th century when this territory was part of the Livonian-inhabited Bishopric of Riga. In the first half of the 16th century, the bailiwick expanded to include some of the Latvian-inhabited castle districts. Koknese (also known as Kokenhusen and built since 1209) is mentioned as a bailiwick at the end of the 13th century and maintained its status as the center of the bailiwick until the Coadjutors' war of 1556-1557.

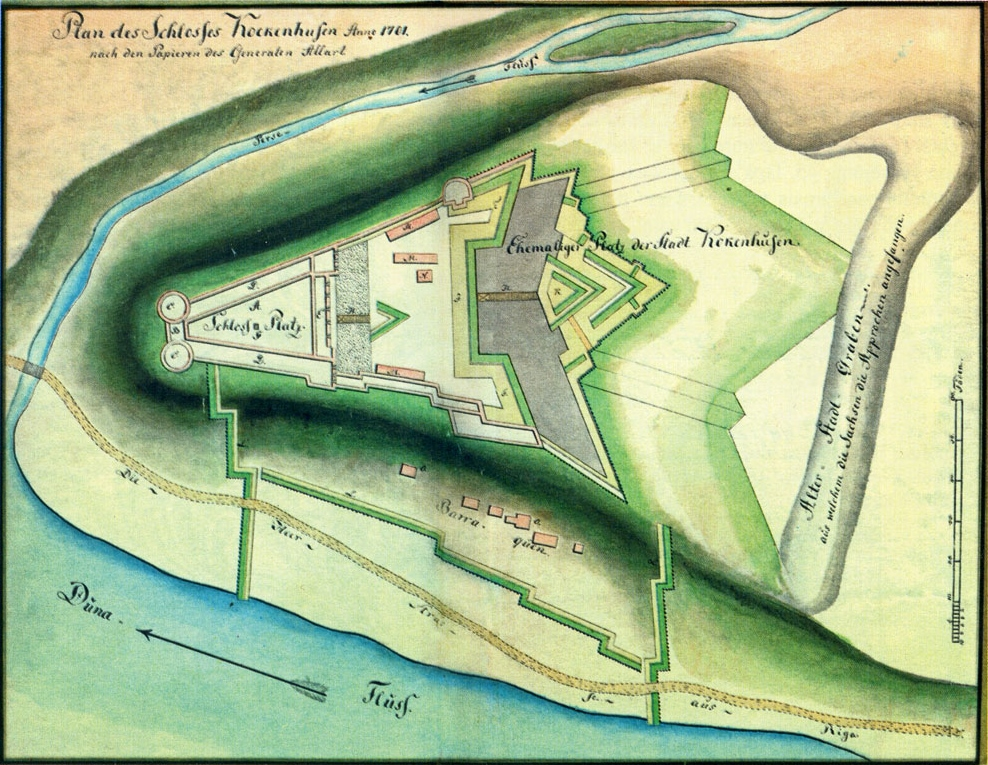
Map of Koknese in 1701 by General Allart

The seals of the Turaida and Koknese bailiffs, which were issued under the authorization of the Archbishop, featured a heraldic symbol of the Archbishopric of Riga - a long bishop's cross and a staff with inscriptions: "sigillum advocati toreiden" and "sigillum advocati kokenhůszen." These seals acknowledged the bailiffs' work and authority in the 15th/16th century.

However, the aristocracy that governed the bailiwick as an inheritable fief did not emerge from the Riga archbishopric. Instead, some vassal families, such as the von Rosen and von Tiesenhausen families, began to form a community in the 13th-14th century, with their fief possessions and bailiwicks eventually becoming the foundation for the Baltic German aristocracy which lasted nearly 8 centuries Bolshevik Revolution in 1917, Latvia declared independence soon after.

The powerful ecclesiastical lords of Livonia sought to curtail the influence of the secular knights in their territories, and they were successful in the Archbishopric of Riga. The position of land-bailiff was particularly esteemed in the 14th century, when the Archbishops of Riga had conflicts with the Teutonic Order and often resided outside of Livonia. The use of fiefs for service allowed the bailiffs to significantly increase their wealth and prestige, ensuring a steady income and strengthening their position.

Disputes over Koknese Castle between the territorial lord and the vassals von Tiesenhausen lasted nearly half a century, until 1397, when the castle was eventually gained by the territorial ruler. As a result, the centers of the bailiwicks in the 15th/16th century were stone castles and domains owned by the Archbishop.

The local knighthood, including land bailiffs, played a significant role in the administration and domestic policy of the Archbishopric of Riga. The Archbishop of Riga granted special joint-property rights, known as "Gesamthand Recht," to the most powerful vassal families of the archbishopric, including the von Rosens, who received their fief in 1350/1428 the von Tiesenhausens in 1417, the von Ungerns in 1455 and the von Üxkülls in 1477. These fiefs allowed the families to govern large fief districts for several centuries and act as territorial lords, granting fiefs to their sub-vassals and building stone and brick castles.

The former bailiwick of Ydumea saw castles spring up on the properties of the von Rosens: Augstroze (Rosen, Hochrosen, 1350), Lielstraupe (Gross-Roop, before 1310), Rozbeķi (Rosenbeck, ca. 1372–1395), Mazstraupe (Klein-Roop, ca. 1408), Mujāni (Mojahn, ca. 1473–1503), and Nabe (Nabbe, before 1318)

With at least nine family members serving as bailiffs of Turaida and Koknese, the von Rosen family was the most prominent and influential among the vassals in the Livonian district of the Archbishopric of Riga. The Rosen family's origins can be traced back to Theoderich (Theodericus), a brother of Bishop Albert of Riga (Albert von Buxhoeveden) (ca. 1165–1229), according to the chronicle of Henry of Livonia, Theoderich married the daughter of Prince Vladimir of Pskow (Woldemarus, rex de Plicekowe), further solidifying the family's connection to the region. In 1213 Vladimir became the Bailiff of Ydumea instead of his son-in-law Theoderich.

== Gallery ==
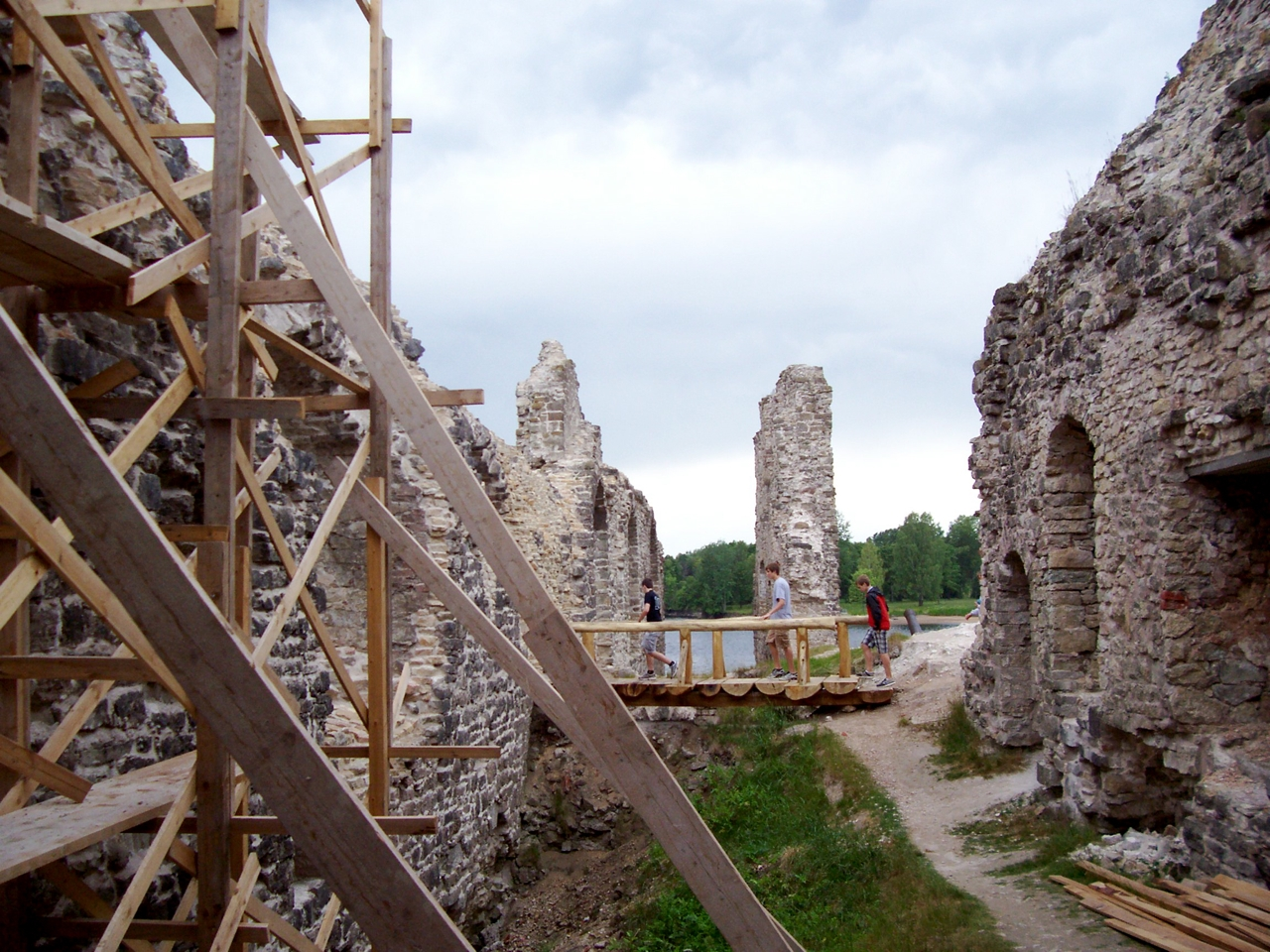

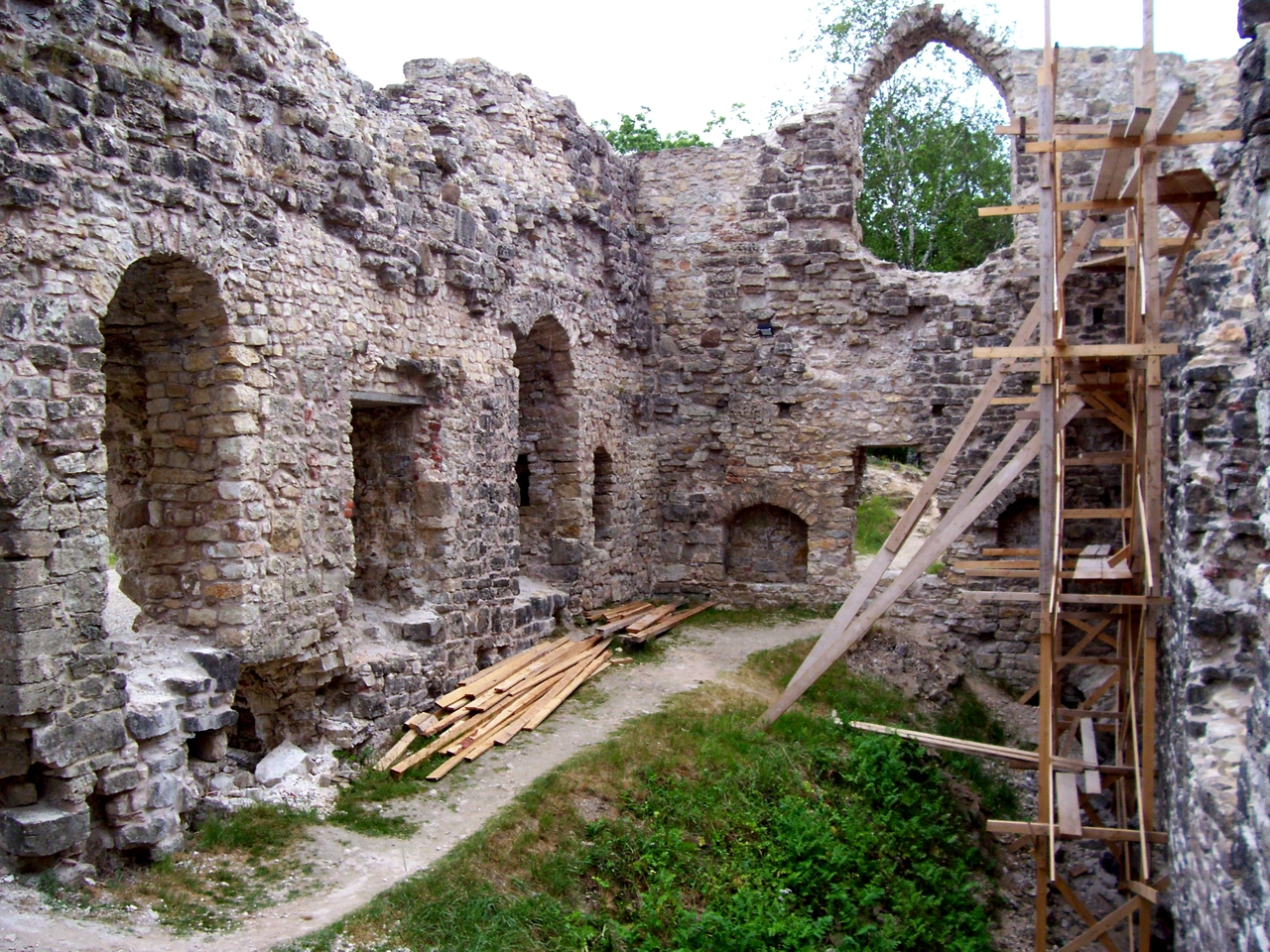

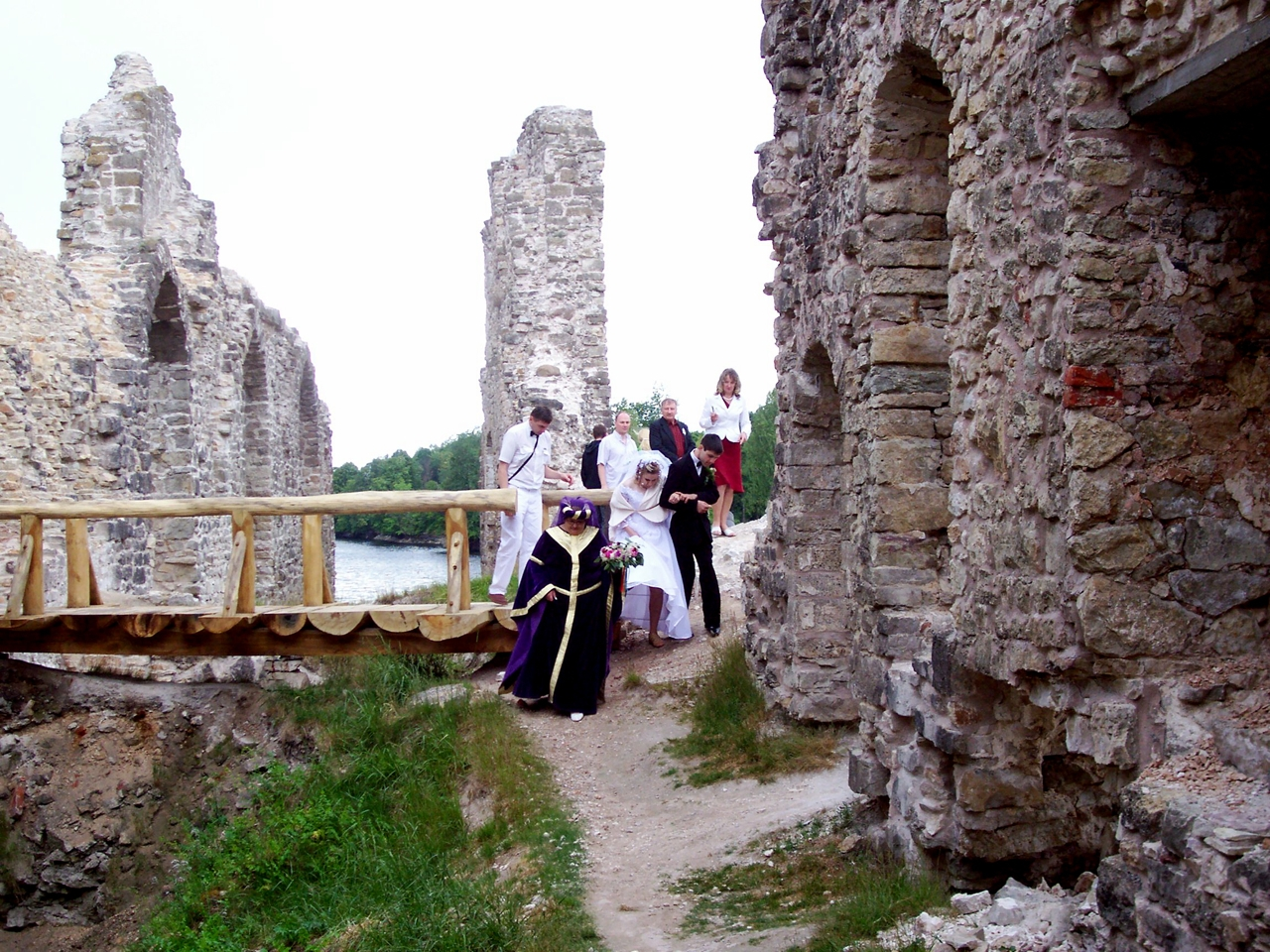

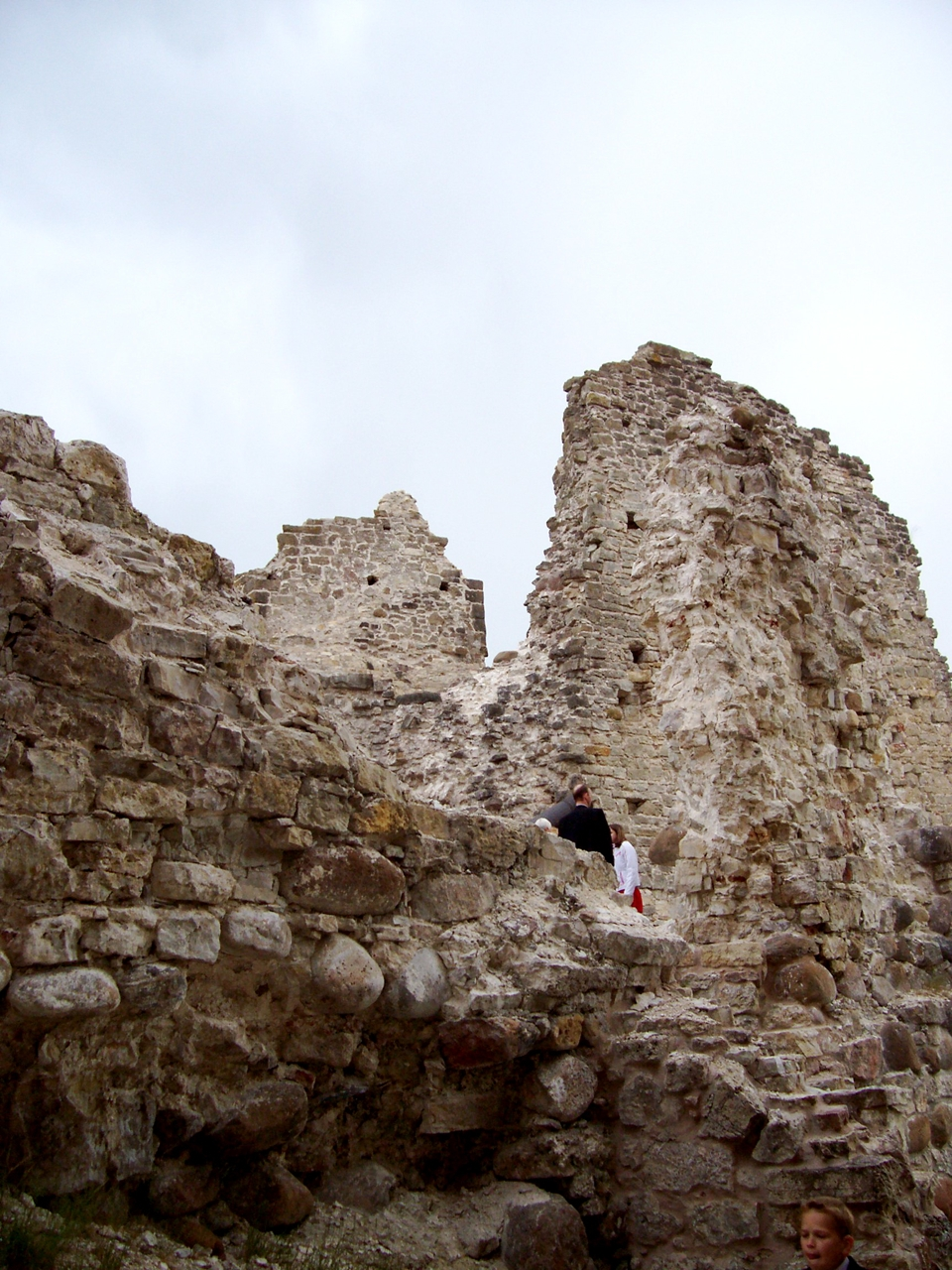

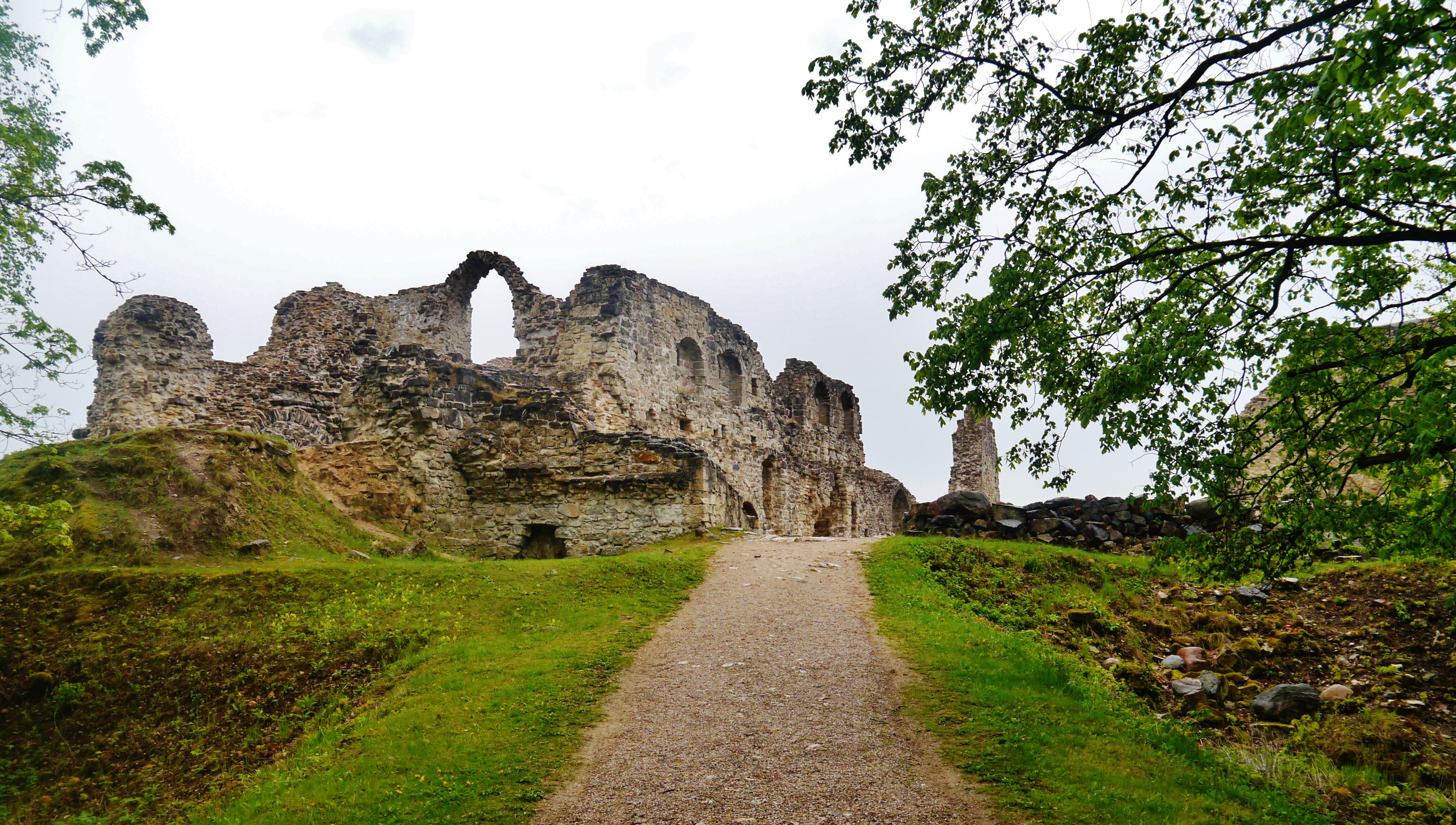

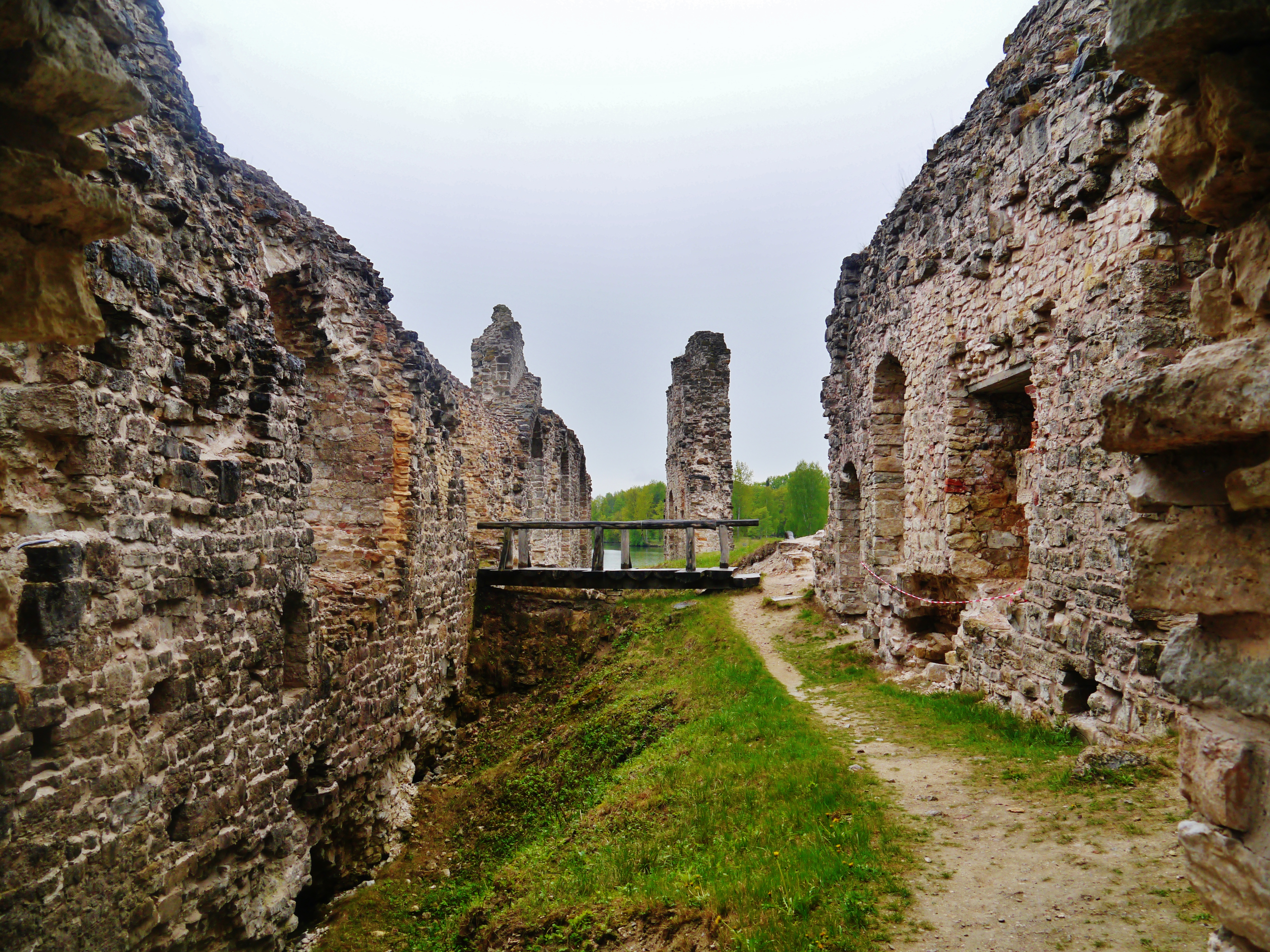

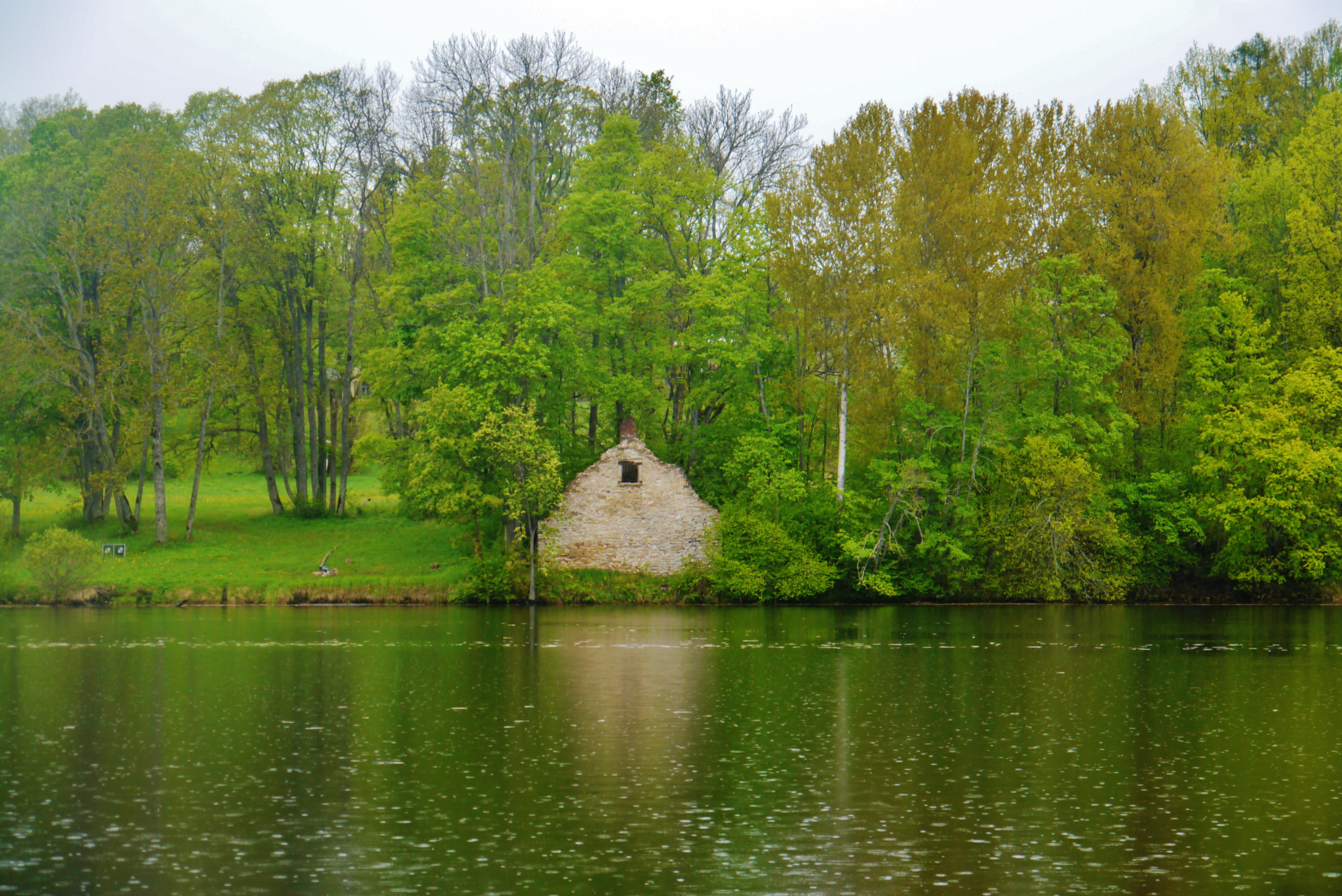

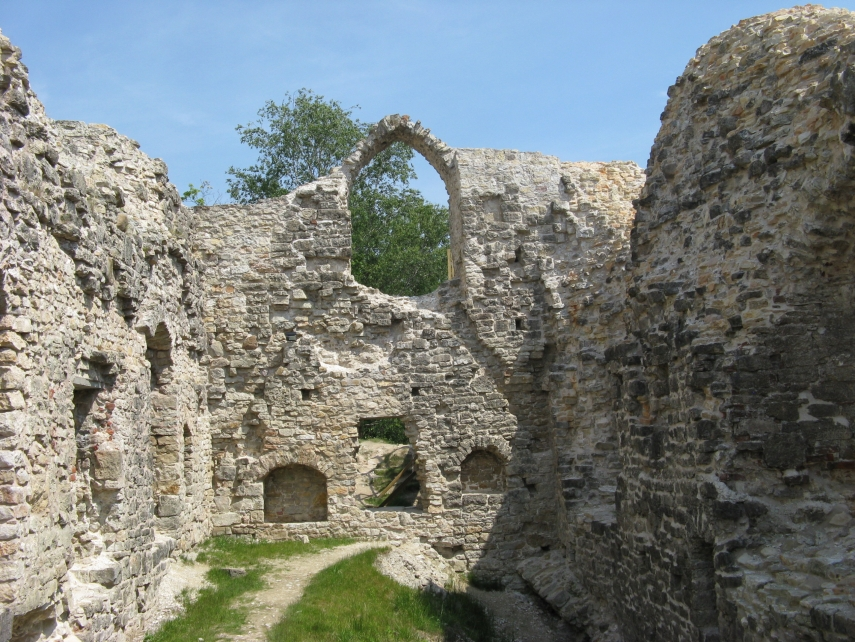

== See also ==
- Principality of Koknese
