= Semigallian =

Semigallian may refer to:

- Semigallia, a region in Latvia
- Semigallians, a Baltic tribe
- Semigallian language, an extinct Baltic language
