= List of Latvian words borrowed from Old East Slavic =

Principalities of Kievan Rus', 1054–1132

This is a list of Latvian words borrowed from Old East Slavic (or its dialects where particularly ts–ch are merged) during 8th–13th centuries.

== Dating ==
Sound changes in OES
Date	Change	Examples
800^{±50}	no liquid diphthongs	before: *xolpъ : kalps [kal̃ps], *xormъ : kārms
825^{±25}	no nasals	...
...	...	before: у/ѫ : uo after: у/ѫ : ū, у : u
...	...	ѧ : ē [ę̃]
988?	yat ..?	before: ѣ : ē [ę̃] after: ѣ : ie
1200^{±50}	yers fall	before: ь : i, ъ : u after: ь_{1} : ?, ъ_{1} : ?, ь_{0}/ъ_{0} : _

== Comparison of letters ==
Vowels
Old East Slavic; Latvian	ъ—ь u—i	о—а a—a/ā	у o/ū	ѫ—ѧ o—ē	е—ѣ e—ē/iẽ	и ī/i/ìe	ꙑ ui

Consonants
Old East Slavic; Latvian	р—л r—l	н—м—в n—m—v	б—п b—p	д—т d—t	з—с z—s	ж—ц ž—c	г—к—х g—k—k

Other
Old East Slavic; Latvian	лꙗ ļa	ꙗ jã	кꙑ ķī	хꙑ ķī

== List of words ==
List structure:

- Old East Slavic: Latvian "meaning"
- [] contain alternative/other form

=== Orthodoxy ===
- крьстъ: krusts [krists] "cross". Possibly 'u' from Latin crux "cross".
- божьница: baznīca [baznîca] "church".
- говѣти: gavēt [gavêt] "to fast"
- грамота: grāmata [grãmata] "book"
- грѣхъ: grēks [grę̀ks] "sin"
- хоругꙑ: karogs [karuõgs] "flag, banner"
- недѣлꙗ: nedēļa [nedẽļa] "week"
- *свѧтъкъ [свꙗтокъ]: svētki [svę̀tki] "holiday, celebration"
- свѧтъ: svēts [svę̀ts] "holy, sacred"
- звонъ: zvans "bell"
- поганъ: pagãns "pagan, heathen". Alternatively from Latin.

=== Society or government ===
- рѫбежь: robeža [rùobeža] "border, frontier"
- сѫдъ: sods [sùods] "penalty, punishment".
- тълкъ: tulks [tũlks, tul̃ks] "interpreter, translator"
- погостъ: pagasts "parish?"
- право: prāva [prāvas] "lawsuit?"
- пълкъ: pulks [pùlks, pul̂ks] "regiment"
- страдати: strādāt [stràdât] "to work"
- человѣкъ [*чьловѣкъ]: cilvēks [cìlvę̃ks] "human, person"
- мѣсто: miẽsts "village"
- боꙗринъ: bajãrs "boyar"
- сѫди: sùoģis "judge"

=== Trading ===
- търгъ: tirgus [tìrgus] "market". Unless related ('ъ' > 'u' is expected).
- безмѣнъ: bezmēns [bęzmę̄ns, vęzmę̄ns] "steelyard"
- цѣна: cena "price"
- мꙑто: muita [muĩta] "customs (duty)"
- скѫпъ: skops [skùops] "stingy, miserly"

=== Household ===
- кожухъ: kažoks [kažuõks] "fur coat"
- мѫка: mokas [muõkas] "torment, agony"
- сума: soma [suoma] "bag"
- истъба: istaba [istuba, ustaba, ustuba] "room (building)"
- дуда: dūdas [dũda] "bagpipe"
- котьлъ: katls "boiler"
- кꙑсель: ķīselis "kissel"
- мѧтьлъ: mētelis [mètelis] "coat (garment)"
- сапогъ [забогъ]: zābaks (zàbaks) "boot (footwear)".
- жьзлъ: zizlis [zizls] "wand, baton"
- ножь: nazis "knife"
- стькло: stikls "glass"

=== Other ===
- *Кривъ: krìevs "Russian (person)". Compare Russian кривичи "Krivichs".
- пустъ: posts [puõsts]
- богатъ: bagāts [bagâts] "rich, wealthy"
- думати: domāt [duõmât] "to think"
- дума: doma [duõma] "thought, idea, opinion"
- умъ: oma [uôma] "mood (mind)". Or at least partly inherited.
- сулити: solīt [sùolît] "to promise"
- хꙑтръ: neķītrs "obscene, dirty, lewd"
- поваръ: pavārs [pavãrs] "cook"
- капуста: kāposti [kàpuõsts] "cabbage"
- сѣра: sērs [sę̃rs] "sulfur"
- бѣда: bēda [bę̀da] "sorrow, grief"
