= Shunmyō Masuno =

Japanese monk and garden designer

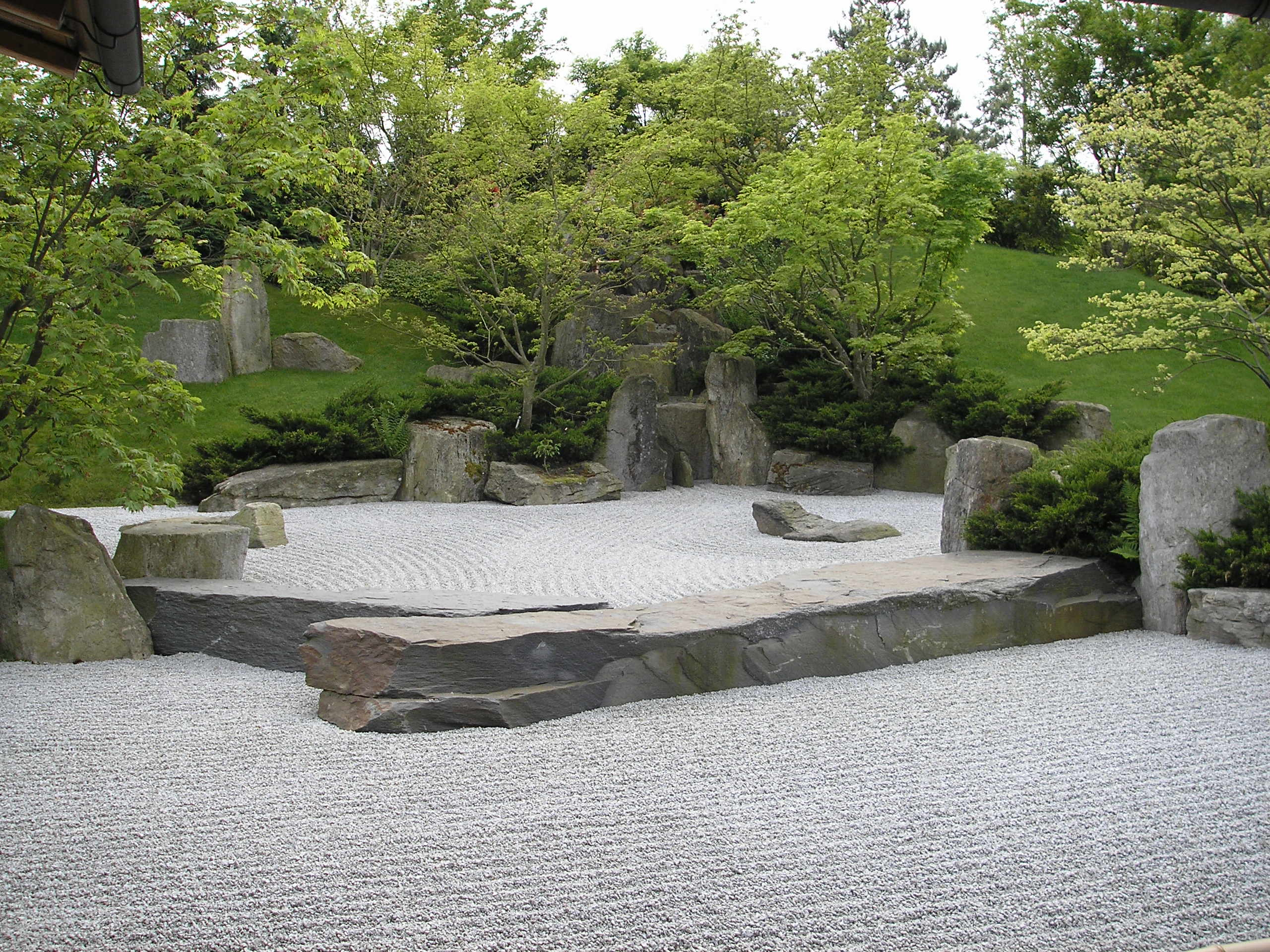
Japanese garden at Erholungspark Marzahn, Berlin (2003)

Shunmyō Masuno (枡野 俊明, Masuno Shunmyō) (born 28 February 1953) is a Japanese monk and garden designer. He is chief priest of the Sōtō Zen temple Kenkō-ji (建功寺), professor at Tama Art University, and president of a design firm that has completed numerous projects in Japan and overseas. He has been called "Japan's leading garden designer".

== Career ==
Shunmyō Masuno was born in Yokohama as the eldest child of the 17th chief priest of Kenkō-ji. After graduating in 1975 from the Faculty of Agriculture of Tamagawa University he continued an apprenticeship in garden design under Katsuo Saitō, who had designed the garden at his father's temple. From 1979 he underwent Zen training at Sōji-ji, one of the two head temples of the Sōtō school. He founded Japanese Landscape Consultants, his garden design firm, in 1982. He became chief priest of Kenkō-ji in 2000.

Since the 1980s he has lectured at universities such as Cornell, University of London, and Harvard. He is a professor in the Department of Environmental Design at Tama Art University since 1998, and has also taught at the University of British Columbia. Through his firm, he has designed dozens of gardens throughout Japan and around the world. They include traditional designs such as the Japanese garden at Berlin's Erholungspark Marzahn park as well as strikingly contemporary designs such as the karesansui garden at the Canadian Embassy in Tokyo.

== Philosophy ==
When designing a garden, Masuno first meditates and establishes a dialog with the space. This requires an emptying of the self in order to "hear" the elements of the garden speak. In discussions with the philosopher Koji Tanaka, he explained his perspective on the ethics of gardening, saying that gardening brings about a gentleness in the designer, builder, and caretakers. The garden teaches the suchness or intrinsic value of each thing, the connectedness, harmony, tranquility, and sacredness of the everyday. Developing a sense of respect for all things is no small step in becoming an ethical human being, both with respect to other humans and the environment at large.

== Selected publications ==
- Ten Landscapes: Shunmyo Masuno. Rockport. 1999. ISBN 978-1-56496-614-8.
- 禅の庭: 枡野俊明の世界 [Zen Gardens: The world of Shunmyō Masuno] (in Japanese). Mainichi Shimbun. 2003. ISBN 978-4-620-60600-2.
- Inside Japanese Gardens―From Basics to Planning, Management and Improvement. Kokusai Hana to Midori no Hakurankai Kinenkyōkai [The Commemorative Foundation for the International Garden and Greenery Exposition]. 2003. ISBN 4-620-90636-0.
- 夢窓疎石: 日本庭園を極めた禅僧 [Musoh-soseki : Zen priest who established the secrets of the Japanese garden] (in Japanese). NHK Books. 2005. ISBN 9784140910290.
- 禅と禅芸術としての庭 [Gardens as Zen and Zen art] (in Japanese). Mainichi Shimbun. 2008. ISBN 978-4-620-60633-0.
- 禅の庭II 枡野俊明作品集 2004-2009 [Zen Gardens: Works by Shunmyō Masuno 2004–2009] (in Japanese). Mainichi Shimbun. 2010. ISBN 978-4-620-60651-4.
- The Art of Simple Living: 100 Daily Practices from a Japanese Zen Monk for a Lifetime of Calm and Joy. Michael Joseph. 2019. ISBN 978-0525505846.

== Selected designs ==
- Likteņdārzs ("Garden of Destiny"), Latvia
