= Vyachko =

Prince of Koknese (d. 1224)

- Prince of Koknese; Prince of Yuryev
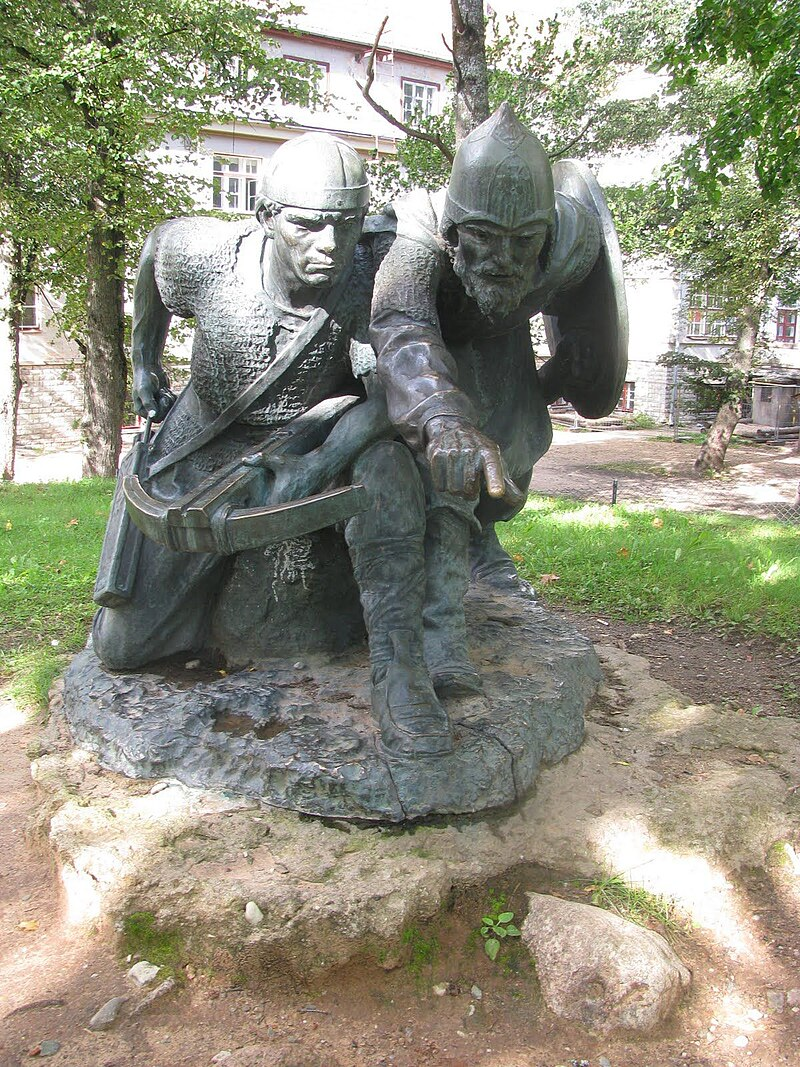
- Monument to Vyachko (right) in Tartu, Estonia
- Reign: Until 1224
- Died: 15 August 1224; Yuryev

Vyachko (Russian: Вячко; died 1224; also Vyacheslav), also known as Vetseke, was the prince of Koknese (Kuikenos). He later became the prince of Yuryev (now Tartu) while in the service of Novgorod, which was the last Russian stronghold in Estonia. He died during the defense of the city against the Livonian Brothers of the Sword in 1224.

== Origins ==
Vetseke may have been the equivalent to the Russian Vyachko (a shortened form of Vyacheslav). Evidence from the Chronicle of Henry of Livonia indicates the possibility that he came from a local élite, perhaps a Livonian, who converted to Orthodox Christianity and became a vassal of the Principality of Polotsk. Despite this, he was still perceived as a Russian prince.

The Chronicle says that the population of Koknese (Kokenhusen) included Balts (Latgallians and Selonians) and a Germanic colony, as well as some Slavic peoples.

== Early relations with the Crusaders ==
At the beginning of the 13th century, when during the Northern Crusades the crusading Teutonic knights led by bishop Albert of Buxhoeveden began to establish themselves on the shores of the Gulf of Riga, Vetseke ruled the fortress of Koknese some 100 km upstream of the Daugava.

Although his principality is believed to have been subject to Polotsk, this did nothing to help him withstand either the Knights’ nor the Lithuanians’ pressure. According to the Chronicle of Henry of Livonia, it was indeed in return for protection against the Lithuanians that Vetseke offered half of his land and the fort to Albert in 1205 (...offerens sibi terre et castri sui medietatem). Albert accepted the offer and promised to send Vetseke weapons and men.

In 1208, Koknese was captured by the Livonians of Lielvārde in retaliation of Vetseke's raids. Vetseke and all his wealth were captured and the king himself cast in chains. However, Daniel, the knight of Lielvārde (Danielus de Lenewarde), upon hearing the news of Vetseke's capture immediately notified bishop Albert who then "ordered the fort to be restored to the king and all his wealth to be given back to him". He then summoned Vetseke to Riga where he honored him with gifts of many horses and suits of precious garments. The bishop then sent Vetseke back along with "twenty strong men with arms, knights with their mounts, ballistarii, and masons to strengthen the fort and hold it against the Lithuanians", just as he had promised three years earlier.

After sending Vetseke back to Koknese bishop Albert prepared to leave on a customary annual trip to Germany in order to recruit new crusaders to replace the ones whose pilgrimage was completed. Knowing that only a few defenders had remained in Riga, Vetseke had the support troops and artisans sent by Albert murdered and then "sent the best German horses, ballistas, coats of mail, and similar things" to Grand Prince Vladimir of Polotsk, "with an urgent request that he call together an army and come as quickly as possible to take Riga, in which he said few men remained, the best having been killed by him and the others having gone away with the bishop". Vladimir, whom the chronicler describes as an "excessively credulous king", responded by gathering an army in anticipation of the expedition.

Meanwhile, the leaving crusader army had been detained in Dünamünde by a contrary wind. After receiving word of Vetseke's treachery and the massacre at Koknese from the few survivors who had reached Riga, the flotilla turned back and returned to the city. Upon hearing that a grand army of crusaders and native Livonians has gathered in Riga, the Russians became afraid, "divided the arms and horses of the Germans among themselves, set fire to the fort of Koknese and fled, each one on his own way". Vetseke, however, "since he had acted evilly, departed for Russia, never to return thenceforth to his kingdom".

The crusaders, being deprived of the opportunity to gather loot in Koknese, took revenge on the local Latvian population by killing many Latgallians and Selonians who had fled to the woods. By 1209, Koknese had been taken over by the Order and the formal sovereignty of Polotsk was finally revoked in 1215.

== Vetseke's death in Tartu ==
In 1223, there was a general anti-crusader uprising in all of mainland Estonia. After the German garrisons had been killed the Estonians took over all the fortresses. In order to secure their initial military success, mercenary troops were invited from Novgorod and Pskov and stationed in several key fortresses such as Viljandi and Tartu.

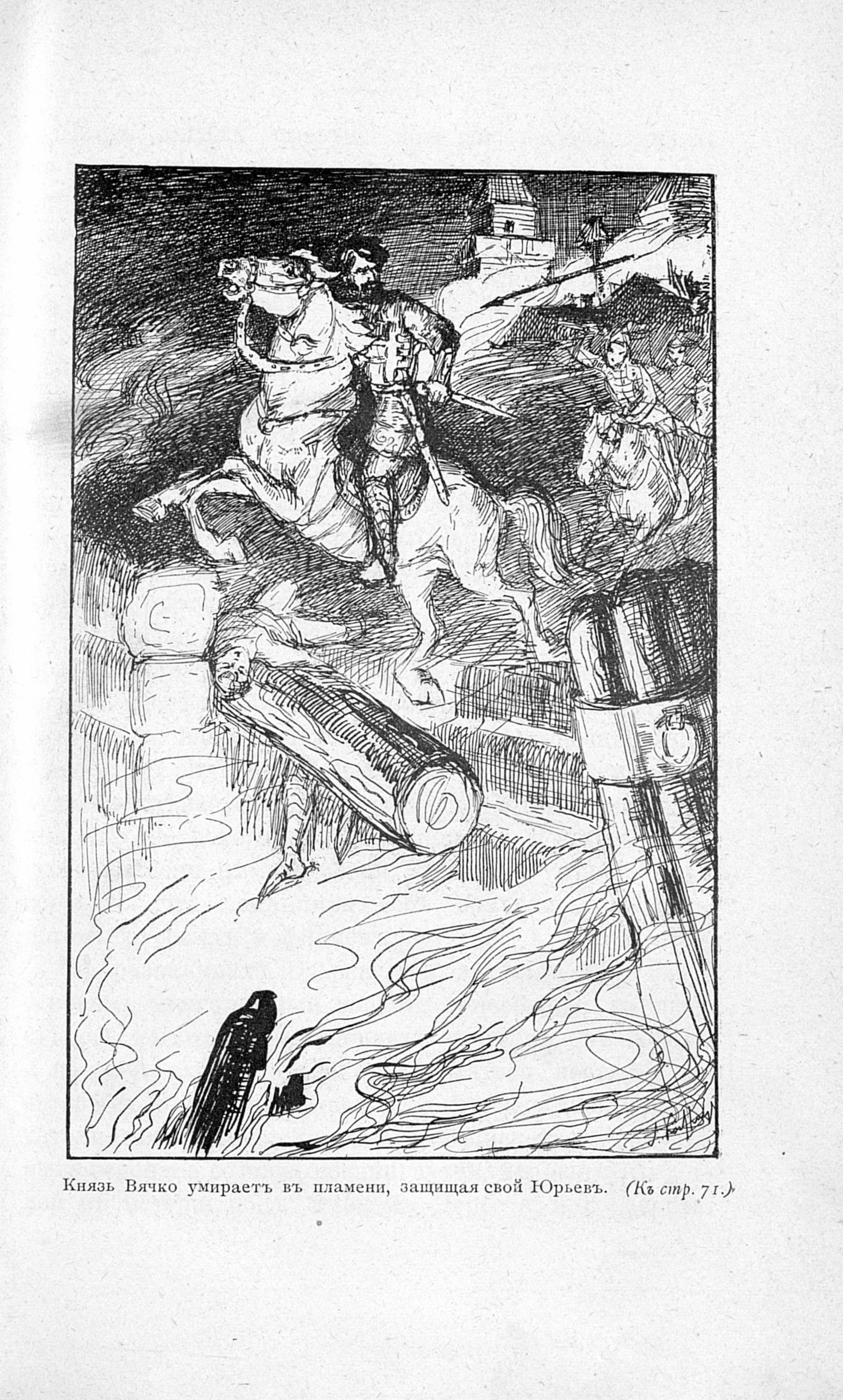
The death of Vyachko

Vetseke, who had lost his earlier dominions to the crusaders and Livonians, was given money and two hundred men by the Novgorod Republic so that he could establish himself in Tarbatu (present-day Tartu) or any other place "that he could conquer for himself". In Russian historiography this payment for military help has been interpreted as the Estonians subjugating themselves to Vetseke and paying him tax. Soviet historiography claimed that the "Russian-Estonian cooperation" in the defense of Tartu "against common enemy – the German colonizers" – was a sign of "friendship between the two brotherly nations".

By 1224, Tartu remained the last centre of anti-crusader resistance in south Estonia. In addition to the local Ugandi, many fighters from Sakala and other neighboring provinces had gathered there ("vicinas omnes provincias"). After Easter the crusaders laid siege to Tartu but were forced to leave after only five days of fighting. The bishops sent a delegation to Vetseke and asked him to give up the "heathen rebels" in the fortress and leave, but he chose to stay because "the Novgorodians and Russian princes had promised him the fortress and the surrounding lands" if he could conquer them for himself.

On August 15, 1224, the crusader army, reinforced with a large number of Christian Latvian and Livonian troops, returned with all its might to Tarbatu. The second siege of Tartu in 1224 lasted many days and nights. Vetseke and his 200 troops were again offered free passage through the crusader camp, but Vetseke, expecting a relief army from Novgorod, refused. When the fortress finally fell, all the survivors inside, including women, were killed in the final onslaught. According to the Chronicle of Henry of Livonia Vetseke along with his Russian mercenaries tried to put up resistance in one of the fortifications, but were all dragged out and killed. Of all the people in the fortress, only one Russian was left alive. He was given a good horse and sent back to Novgorod. The relief troops from Novgorod had already reached Pskov when they received the news from Tartu whereupon they decided to cancel the expedition and make peace with the Germans.

== See also ==
- Chronicle of Henry of Livonia
- Full Collection of Russian Chronicles

== Sources ==
- "Вячеслав Борисович" . Brockhaus and Efron Encyclopedic Dictionary (in Russian). 1906.
