= Selonian language =

Extinct Baltic language

Selonian
- Selian
- Native to: Selonia
- Region: Latvia and Lithuania
- Ethnicity: Selonians
- Extinct: 16th century
- Language family: Indo-European: Balto-Slavic; East Baltic; Selonian

Language codes
- ISO 639-3: sxl
- Glottolog: None
- Distribution of the Baltic tribes, c. 1200 CE (boundaries are approximate)

Selonian (Latvian: Sēļu valoda; Lithuanian: Sėlių kalba) was an East Baltic language, which was spoken by the East Baltic tribe of the Selonians, who until the 15th century lived in Selonia, a territory in southeastern Latvia and northeastern Lithuania. The language persisted until the 16th century.

== History ==
Traces of the Selonian language can still be found in the territories the Selonians inhabited, especially in the accent and phonetics of the so-called Selonian dialect of the Latvian language. There are some traces of the Selonian language in the northeastern sub-dialects of the Aukštaitian dialect of the Lithuanian language, mostly in the lexicon.

== Classification ==
It is considered that the Selonian language retained the Proto-Baltic sonorant diphthongs *an, *en, *in, unlike the Lithuanian language, but like the Latvian language the Proto-Baltic *kʲ, *ɡʲ changed to c, dz, and the Proto-Baltic *š, *ž changed to s, z.
