= Principality of Koknese =

Baltic principality (1180s–1206)

- c. 1180–1208
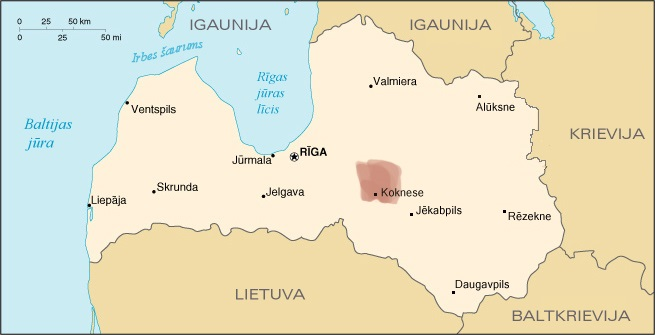
- Border speculations of Principality of Koknese
- Capital: Koknese Castle; 56°42′00″N 25°28′00″E
- Common languages: Latgalian, Selonian
- Religion: Eastern Orthodox Church, Baltic paganism
- Government: Principality
- Prince (regulus)
  - 1180–1206: Vetseke
- History
  - Established: c. 1180
  - Disestablished: 1208
Preceded by	Succeeded by
Principality of Polotsk	Archbishopric of Riga

The Principality of Koknese (Russian: Кукейносское княжество; German: Fürstentum Kokenhusen; Latin: Terra Kukonois) was a small vassal state of the Principality of Polotsk on the right bank of the Daugava River in ancient Livonia (modern Latvia) during the Middle Ages.

== History ==
At the beginning of the 13th century, when the crusading Livonian Brothers of the Sword led by bishop Albert of Riga began to occupy the shores of the Gulf of Riga, the Eastern Orthodox prince Vetseke ruled the fortress of Koknese some 100 km upstream.

According to old sources, Vetseke gave half of his land to Albert of Riga in 1205 in return for protection against the Duchy of Samogitia. During one of their raids he was captured by the Livonians but was released by order of the bishop. When the bishop left for Germany Vetseke rebelled, killed all the Germans in Koknese and called on Polotsk for support. The bishop and his army quickly returned and Vetseke burned his castle and fled to Novgorod. By 1209 Koknese had been taken over by the Brothers of the Sword and the sovereignty of Polotsk was finally revoked in 1215. The knights controlled the town until it was transferred to the Bishopric of Riga in 1238.

Archaeological excavations in Koknese showed that town in the 13th century was inhabited mainly by Latgalians and Selonians with a very small Slavic minority.

== See also ==
- Koknese Castle
- Bibliography of Russian history
