= Semigallian language =

Extinct Baltic language of Semigallia

Semigallian
- Zemgalian
- Native to: Latvia and Lithuania
- Extinct: 16th century
- Language family: Indo-European: Balto-Slavic; East Baltic; Semigallian

Language codes
- ISO 639-3: xzm
- Glottolog: zemg1234
- Distribution of the Baltic tribes, c. 1200 CE (boundaries are approximate)

Semigallian, also known as Zemgalian (Latvian: Zemgaļu valoda; Lithuanian: Žiemgalių kalba), was an East Baltic language of the Baltic language sub-family of the Indo-European languages.

== History ==
It was spoken in the northern part of Lithuania and southern regions of Latvia in what is known as Semigallia. It is thought that it was extinct by the 16th century, with the assimilation by the Latvians and Lithuanians. Semigallian is known only from references to it in documents and texts from before the 16th century.

== Phonology ==
Semigallian shares some phonological similarities to Curonian and, to a lesser extent, Latvian. The Common Baltic /k/, /ɡ/ consonants became /c/, /d͡z/ in their soft varieties in Semigalian. All long vowels and diphthongs at the end of the word in Common Baltic were reduced to simple short vowels in Semigallian.
