= Selonians =

Eastern Baltic ethnic group

Selonians in the context of the other Baltic tribes, c. 1200. The Eastern Balts are shown in brown hues while the Western Balts are shown in green. The boundaries are approximate.

The Selonians (Latvian: sēļi; Lithuanian: sėliai, from Livonian: sälli – "highlanders") were a tribe of Baltic peoples. They lived until the 15th century in Selonia, located in southeastern Latvia and northeastern Lithuania. They eventually merged with neighbouring tribes, contributing to the ethnogenesis of modern Latvians and Lithuanians. They spoke the Eastern Baltic Selonian language.

== History ==
Little is known about the Selonians. There is little archaeological evidence and in historic sources the region is often described as a "scarcely populated land". In written sources they are mentioned only few times.

Archeological data can trace the Selonians back to the beginning of 1st millennium AD when they lived on both sides of the Daugava River. But since the 6th and 7th centuries their settlements can be traced only on the left bank of the river.

Selonian culture had a very strong Latgalian influence. Selonian and Latgalian burial traditions show little difference. Some scholars speculate that during the late Iron Age the Selonians had already partly merged with the Latgalians.

The Chronicle of Henry of Livonia mentions the Selonians at the beginning of the 13th century, when they were conquered and christened. The author of the chronicle describes the Selonians as Lithuanian allies. Their lands were subjects of the principalities of Jersika and Koknese, which were vassals of the principality of Polotsk. The Southern lands however were ruled by Lithuanian lords.

In 1207, the German Brothers of Sword together with their Livonian and Latgalian allies besieged the main Selonian centre at Sēlpils hillfort. Reason for the attack were German claims that Sēlpils hillfort was used as main Lithuanian support base for their attacks in Livonia. After a long siege the Selonians agreed to baptism and German rule and the stone Sēlpils Castle (German: Selburg) was built in place of the hillfort. The Selonians were last mentioned in written sources in the 15th century.

== See also ==
- Selonian language
