= List of ancient Baltic peoples and tribes =

The following is a list of ancient Baltic peoples and tribes.

== Background ==
This is a list of the ancient Baltic peoples and tribes. They spoke the Baltic languages (members of the broader Balto-Slavic), a branch of the Indo-European language family, which was originally spoken by tribes living in area east of Jutland peninsula, southern Baltic Sea coast in the west and Moscow, Oka and Volga rivers basins in the east, to the northwest of the Eurasian steppe. Modern descendants are the Lithuanians and Latvians (they themselves assimilated other related Baltic tribes).

== List of ancient Baltic peoples and tribes (table) ==
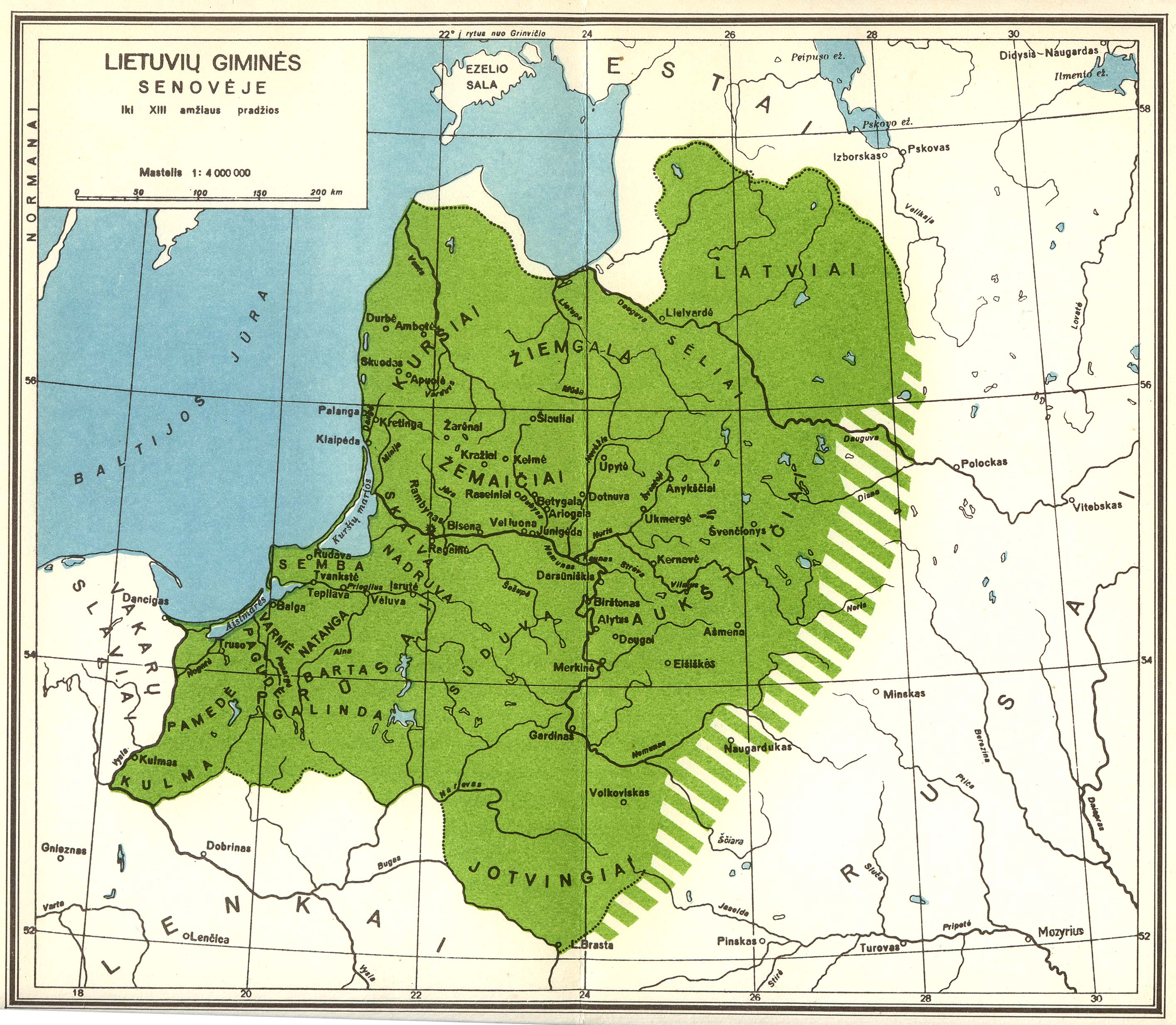
Lithuanian tribes in antiquity until the beginning of the 13th century by Adolfas Šapoka

Groups	Peoples / Nations	Tribes	Languages	Land / Region / Localities
Eastern Balts^{†}	Dniepr Balts	Neuri? (mentioned by Herodotus; possibly a Baltic or Slavic tribe)	Unknown	Dnieper basin (north of the Pontic Eurasian steppe)
Eastern Balts^{†}	Oka Balts	Eastern Galindians	Unknown	Upper courses of the Dniepr and Oka rivers basins, including Moscow region
Eastern (Middle) Balts	Latvians (Latvieši)	Latgalians (Latgaļi)	Old Latgalian	Latvia, Latgalia (Latgola) — Adzele, Gersika or Jersika (Alene, Autine, Casvaine, Ērgļi, Gerdene, Jersika Proper, Lerene, Mārksne, Negeste, Osota, Preiļi), Kūknuojs and Eastern Vāina, Lotygola or Latgalia Proper (Īdeņa, Ludza, Rēzne, Varka), Pītuolova (Ābelene, Abrene, Bērzene, Purnava) and Tuolova or Tālava (Gulbene, Imera, Piebalga, Smiltene, Trikāta and Idumaa and Vendi)
Eastern (Middle) Balts	Lithuanians (Lietuviai)	Old Lithuanians (Senlietuviai)	Old Lithuanian	Eastern Lithuania — Deltuva, Deremela, Lietuva, Nalšia
Eastern (Middle) Balts	Lithuanians (Lietuviai)	Old Lithuanians (Senlietuviai)	Old Lithuanian	Austechia or Central Lithuania (Aukštaitija) — Neris, Upytė
Eastern (Middle) Balts	Lithuanians (Lietuviai)	Samogitians (Žemaitē)	Old Samogitian	Samogitia (Žemaitija) — Gaižuva, Karšuva, Knituva, Kulenė, Milžava, Šiauliai (Šiaulių Žemė), Medininkai and Upytė (Upytės Žemė)
Eastern (Middle) Balts	Lithuanians (Lietuviai)	Prussian Lithuanians (Lietuvininkai)	Old Lithuanian	Lithuania Minor (Mažoji Lietuva)
Transitional Balts^{†}	Curonians		Curonian	Curonia or Courland (Kurzeme, Kursa) — Bandava, Ceklis, Curonian Spit (Kuršu kāpas) and Vistula Spit, Duvzare, Megava, Piemare, Pīlsats, Vanema or Miera Kursa, Ventava
Transitional Balts^{†}	Selonians		Selonian	Selonia (Sēlija) — Alektene, Kalvene, Maleisine, Medene, Pelone, Tovrakste
Transitional Balts^{†}	Semigallians		Semigallian	Semigalia (Zemgale) — Dobele or Duobele, Dobene or Duobe, Guosta Galis, Mežotne, Nogailene, Plāne, Putelene, Sidabre, Silene, Šiurpe, Spārnene, Tērvete, Upmale, Žagare
Western Balts^{†}	Yotvingians		Yotvingian	Yotvingia — Dainava or Dzukija, Jotva or Yotva, Paleksija or Palenke and Sudovia (Sūdava)
Western Balts^{†}	Prussians (Prūsai)	Scalovians	Scalovian	Scalovia and Lamata
Western Balts^{†}	Prussians (Prūsai)	Bartians	Prussian	Bartia
Western Balts^{†}	Prussians (Prūsai)	Lubavians	Prussian	Lubavia
Western Balts^{†}	Prussians (Prūsai)	Nadruvians	Prussian	Nadruvia
Western Balts^{†}	Prussians (Prūsai)	Natangians	Prussian	Natangia
Western Balts^{†}	Prussians (Prūsai)	Pogesanians	Prussian	Pogesania
Western Balts^{†}	Prussians (Prūsai)	Pomesanians	Prussian	Pomesania and Kulmerland
Western Balts^{†}	Prussians (Prūsai)	Sambians	Prussian	Sambia
Western Balts^{†}	Prussians (Prūsai)	Sasnans	Prussian	Sasna
Western Balts^{†}	Prussians (Prūsai)	Warmians or Varmians	Prussian	Warmia
Western Balts^{†}	Prussians (Prūsai)	Western Galindians	Galindian	Galindia (Western)
Western Balts^{†}	Pomeranian Balts	Unknown	Unknown	Pomerania

^{†}Extinct

== Ancestors ==
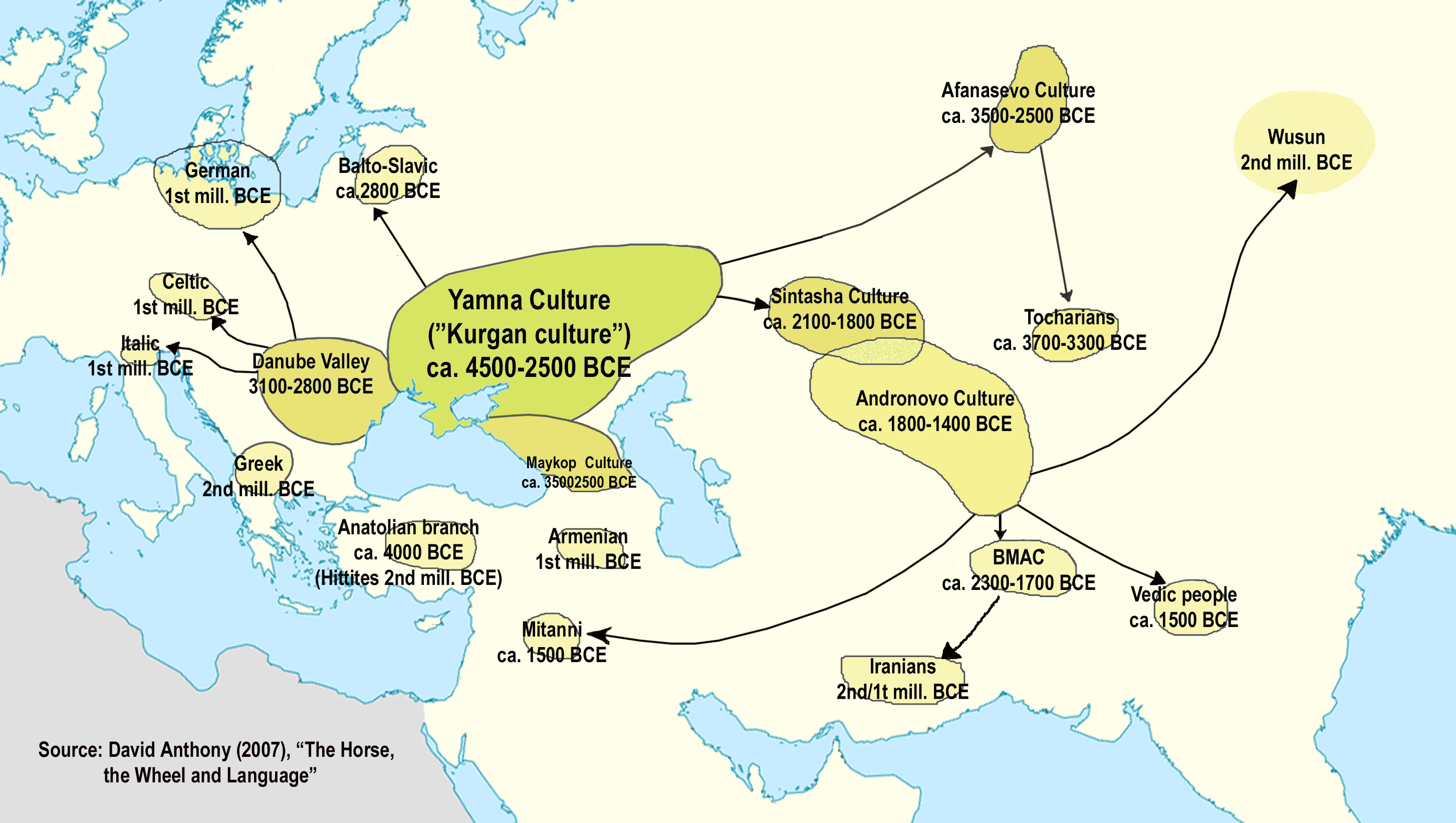
Map 1: Indo-European migrations as described in The Horse, the Wheel, and Language by David W. Anthony

- Proto-Indo-Europeans (Proto-Indo-European speakers)
  - Proto-Balto-Slavs (common ancestors of Balts and Slavs) (Proto-Balto-Slavic speakers)
    - Proto-Balts (Proto-Baltic speakers)

== List of Ancient Baltic peoples and tribes (kinship tree) ==
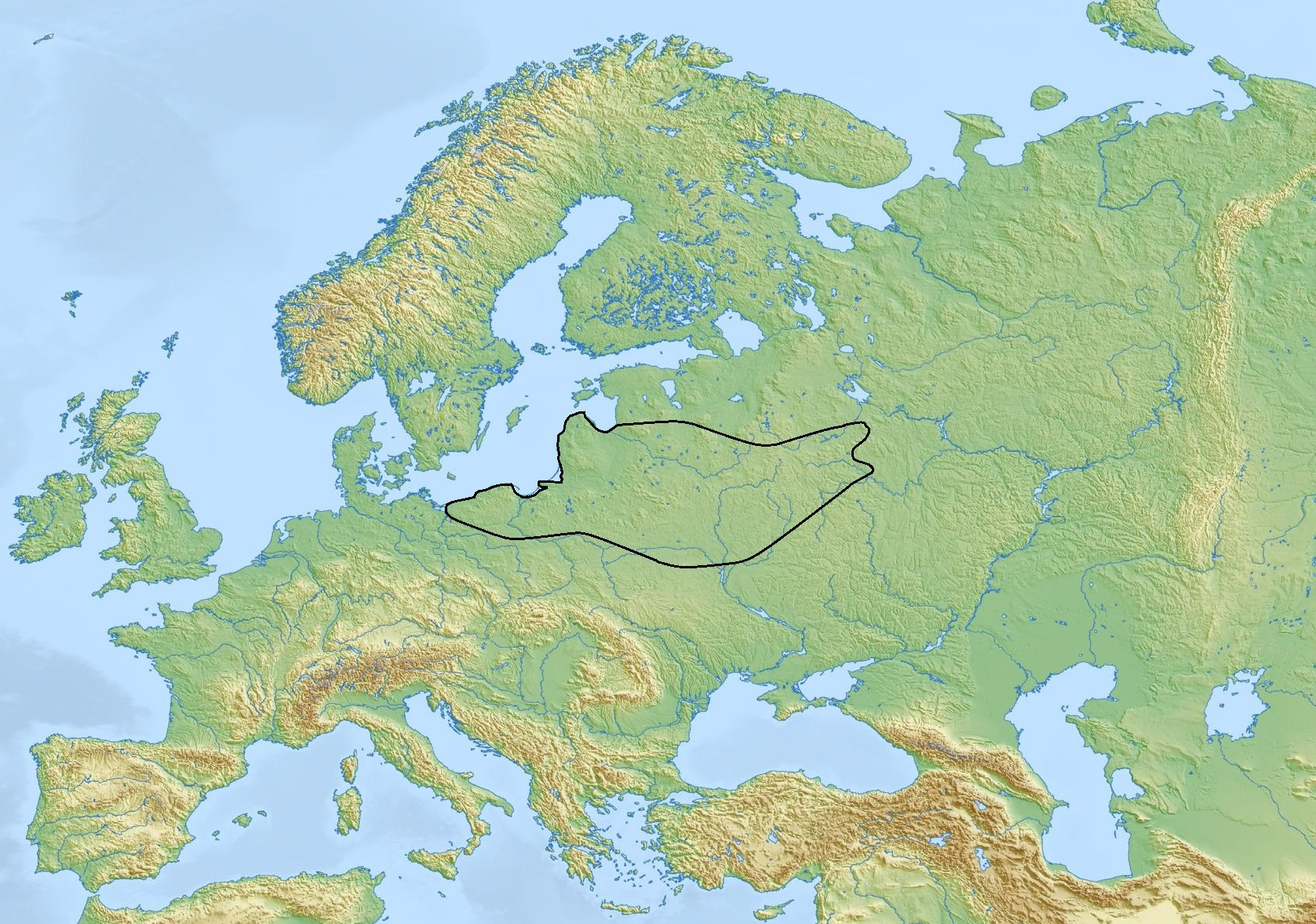
Map 2: Distribution area of Baltic hydronyms. This area is considered the urheimat of the Balts.

Map 3: Baltic archaeological cultures in the Iron Age from 600 BC to 200 BC. Sambian-Nothangian group Western Masurian group (Galindians?) Eastern Masurian group (Yotvingians) Lower Neman and West-Latvian group (Curonians) Brushed Pottery culture Milograd culture Plain-Pottery culture, AKA Dnepr-Dvina culture Pomeranian culture Bell-shaped burials group

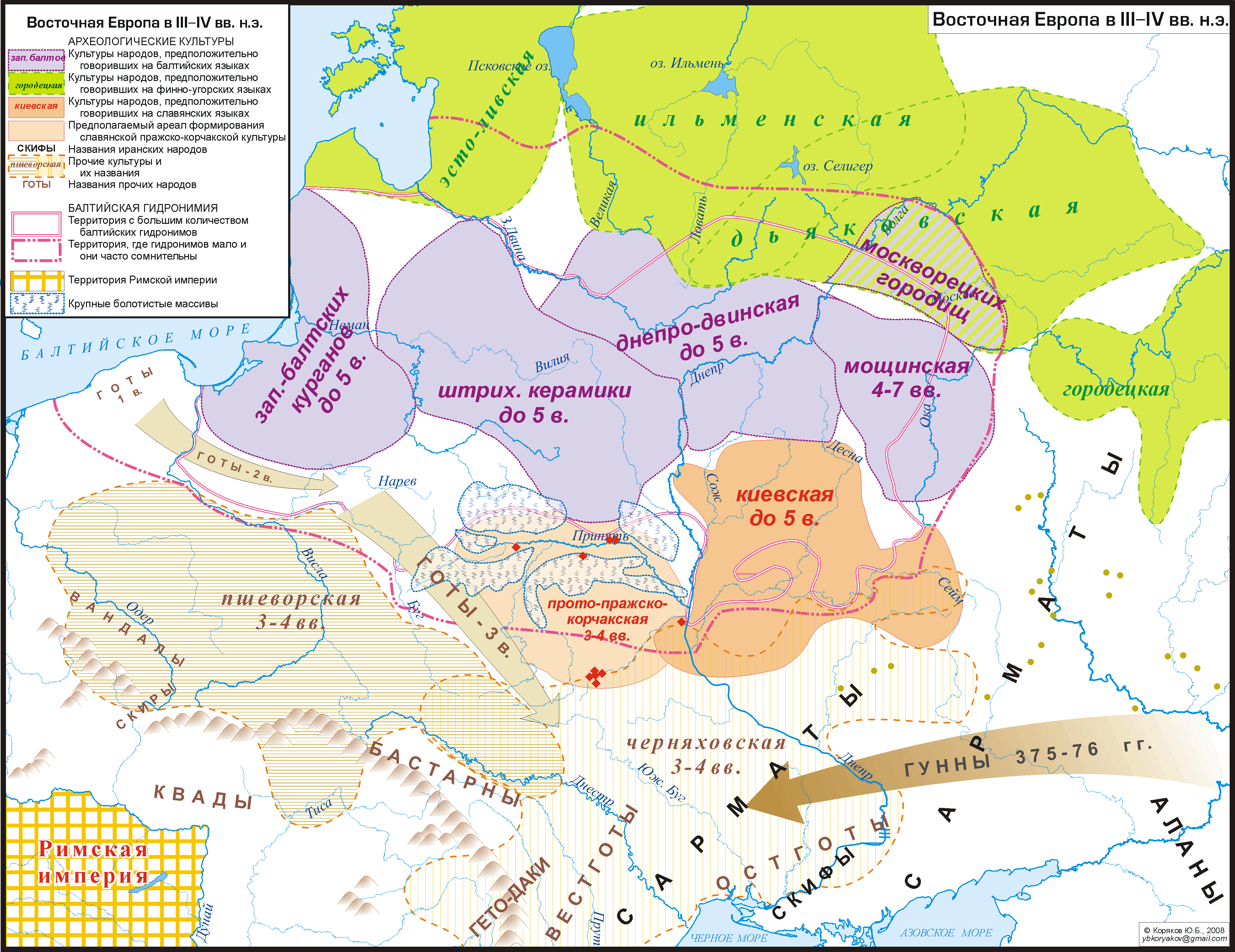
Map 4: Eastern Europe in 3-4th century CE with archaeological cultures identified as Baltic-speaking in purple. Their area extended from the Baltic Sea to modern Moscow region.

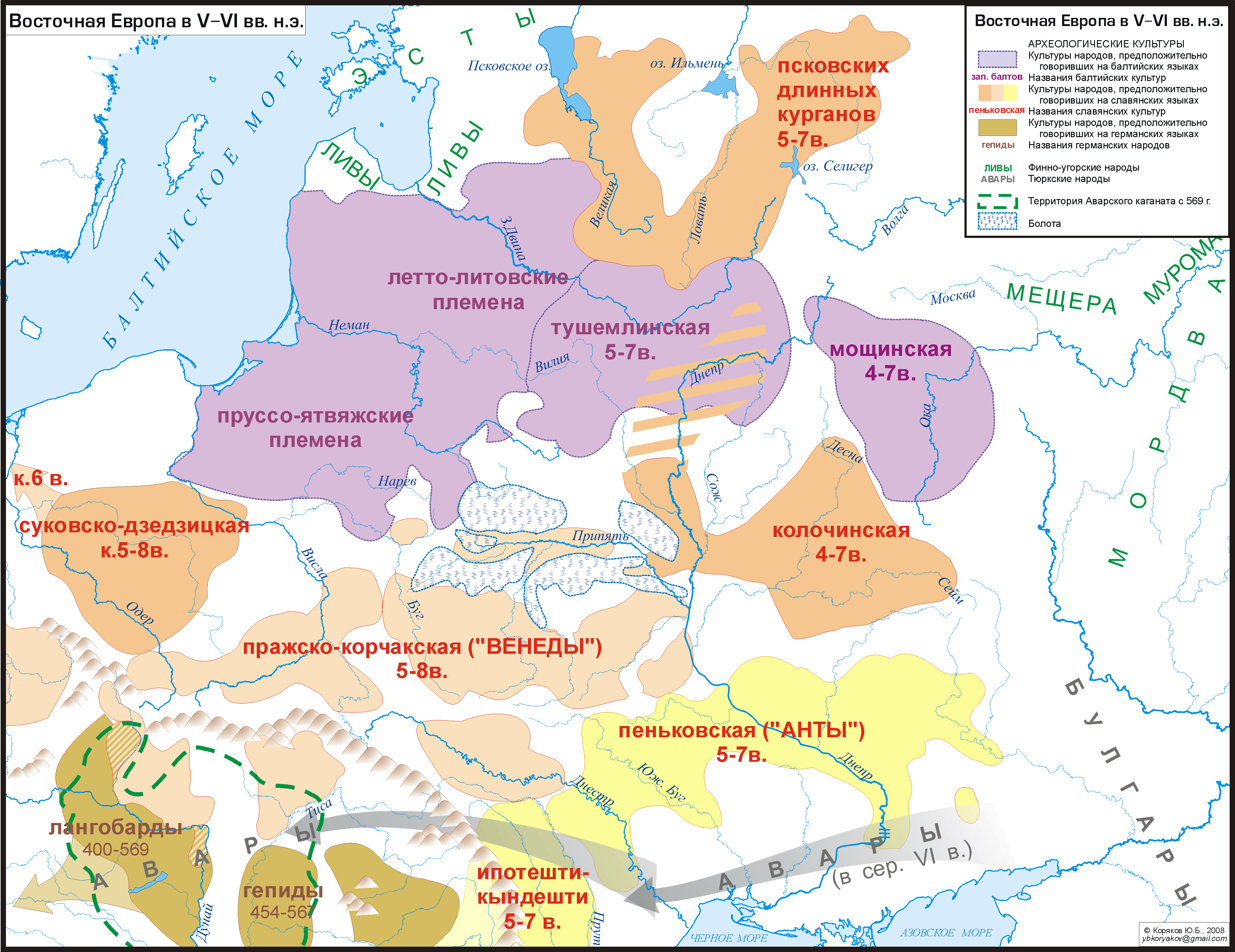
Map 5: During the Migration Period in 5-6th century CE, the area of archaeological cultures identified as Baltic is becoming more fragmented.

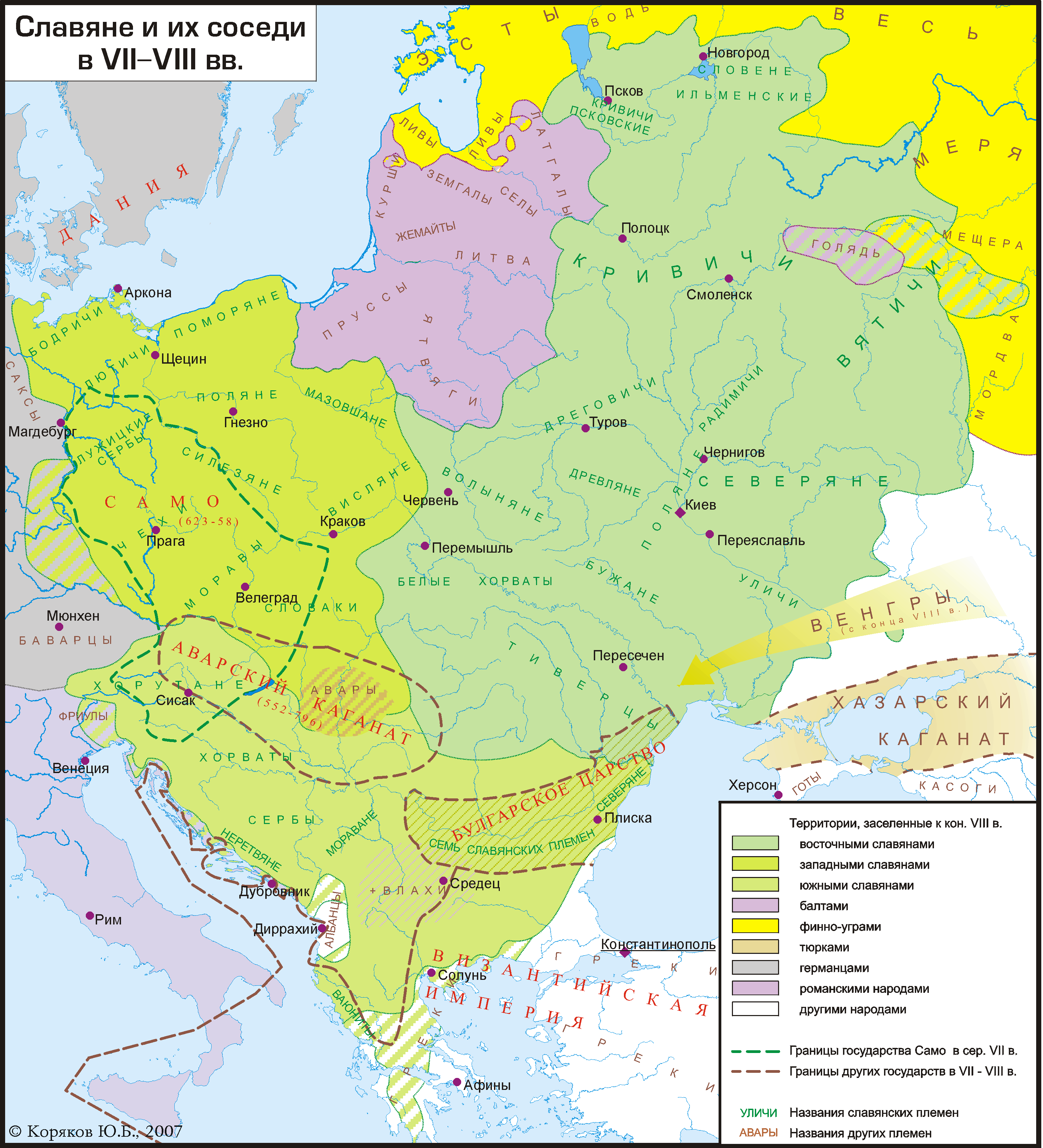
Map 6: By the 7th–8th century CE, only Eastern Galindians remain in the east within the Slavic territory.

Map 7: Distribution of the Baltic tribes, circa 1200 CE. The Eastern Balts are shown in brown hues while the Western Balts are shown in green. The boundaries are approximate.

- Balts
  - Eastern Balts
    - Eastern Galindians
    - Eastern (Middle) Balts
      - Latgalians (Latgaļi / Letgaļi / Leti) (they lived in Latgalia — Latgola)
        - Latvians (they were formed by the merger of Latgalians, as the main component, with the Selonians, Semigallians, Curonians and Livonians, the last ones are a Finnic people and not an Indo-European one) (they live in Latvia)
      - Transitional Balts (between Latgalians and Lithuanians)
        - Selonians (they lived in Selonia — Sēlija)
        - Semigallians (they lived in Semigallia — Zemgale)
        - Curonians (they lived in Curonia or Courland)
          - Curonian Kings (Kuršu Koniņi) (a distinct Latvian cultural group of Curonian ancestry) (they live in seven villages between Kuldīga and Aizpute in Courland)
          - Kursenieki (although they adopted a Latvian dialect, with Curonian substrate, they keep a distinct Curonian ethnic identity and name) (they lived in the Curonian and Vistula Spits)
      - Lithuanians (Senlietuviai) (they lived in Eastern Lithuania, later expanding westward into Samogitian territory and forming a separate cultural group — the Aukštaitians)
        - Samogitians (Žemaitē) (they lived in Samogitia, might have been a distinct Baltic tribe)
        - Prussian Lithuanians or Small Lithuanians (Lietuvininkai) (they lived in Lithuania Minor, northeastern Prussia)
  - Western Balts
    - Scalovians (Skallawai) (they lived in Scalovia — Skallawa)
    - Prussians (Old Prussians, Baltic Prussians) (Prūsai) (they lived in Prussia, Old Prussia or Baltic Prussia)
      - Bartians (Bartai) (they lived in Bartia — Barta)
      - Lubavians (Lubawai) (they lived in Lubavia — Lūbawa)
      - Nadruvians (Nadrāuwai) (they lived in Nadruvia — Nadrāuwa)
      - Natangians (Natangai or Notangiai) (they lived in Natangia — Nātanga or Notangi)
      - Pogesanians (Paguddiai) (they lived in Pogesania — Paguddi)
      - Pomesanians (Pameddiai) (they lived in Pomesania — Pameddi)
      - Sambians (Sembai) (they lived in Sambia — Semba)
      - Sasnans (Sasnai) (they lived in Sasna)
      - Warmians (Wārmiai) (they lived in Warmia — Wārmi)
    - Western Galindians (Galindai) (they lived in Western Galindia — Galinda)
    - Yotvingians (they lived in Yotvingia)

== Hypothetical Ancient Baltic peoples and tribes ==
- Eastern Balts
  - Dniepr-Oka Balts
    - Dniepr Balts
    - Oka Balts
- Western Balts
  - Pomeranian Balts

== Possible Balts ==
=== Balts or Slavs ===
- Neuri / Navari (a people mentioned by Herodotus)

=== Balts, Slavs or Uralics ===
- Budini
