= Šapoka =

- Lithuanian surname
- m.: Šapoka
- f.: (unmarried): Šapokaitė
- f.: (married): Šapokienė

Šapoka

- Adolfas Šapoka
- Vida Marija Čigriejienė-Šapokaitė (born 1936), Lithuanian physician, politician (M.P.) and public figure
- Vilius Šapoka
