= Balts =

Group of peoples in northern Europe

- Countries with a predominantly Baltic population

Total population
- c. 5.4 million (including the diaspora)

Regions with significant populations
- Lithuania: 2,397,418
- Latvia: 1,182,008

Languages
- Baltic languages

Religion
- Predominantly Roman Catholicism and Protestantism; minority Eastern Orthodoxy and Baltic neopaganism

Related ethnic groups
- Other Indo-European-peoples, especially Slavs

The Balts or Baltic peoples (Lithuanian: baltai, Latvian: balti) are a group of peoples inhabiting the eastern coast of the Baltic Sea who speak Baltic languages. Among the Baltic peoples are modern-day Lithuanians (including Samogitians) and Latvians (including Latgalians) — all East Balts — as well as the Old Prussians, Curonians, Sudovians, Skalvians, Yotvingians and Galindians — the Western Balts — whose languages and cultures are now extinct, but made a large influence on the living branches, especially on literary Lithuanian language.

The Balts are descended from a group of Proto-Indo-European tribes who settled the area between the lower Vistula and southeast shore of the Baltic Sea and upper Daugava and Dnieper rivers, and which over time became differentiated into West and East Balts. In the fifth century CE, parts of the eastern Baltic coast began to be settled by the ancestors of the Western Balts, whereas the East Balts lived in modern-day Belarus, Ukraine and Russia. In the first millennium CE, large migrations of the Balts occurred. By the 13th and 14th centuries, the East Balts shrank to the general area that the present-day Balts and Belarusians inhabit.

Baltic languages belong to the Balto-Slavic branch of the Indo-European languages. One of the features of Baltic languages is the number of conservative or archaic features retained.

== Etymology ==
Medieval German chronicler Adam of Bremen in the latter part of the 11th century AD was the first writer to use the term "Baltic" in reference to the sea of that name. Before him various ancient places names, such as Balcia, were used in reference to a supposed island in the Baltic Sea.

In Germanic languages there was some form of the toponym East Sea until after about the year 1600, when maps in English began to label it as the Baltic Sea. By 1840, German nobles of the Governorate of Livonia adopted the term "Balts" to distinguish themselves from Germans of Germany. They spoke an exclusive dialect, Baltic German, which was regarded by many as the language of the Balts until 1919.

In 1845, Georg Heinrich Ferdinand Nesselmann proposed a distinct language group for Latvian, Lithuanian, and Old Prussian, which he termed Baltic. The term became prevalent after Latvia and Lithuania gained independence in 1918. Up until the early 20th century, either "Latvian" or "Lithuanian" could be used to mean the entire language family.

== History ==
=== Origins ===
Baltic archaeological cultures in the Iron Age from 600 BC to 200 BC Dollkeim-Kovrovo culture (Sambians and Natangians) Olsztyn culture (Galindians?) Sudovian culture (Yotvingians) Neman culture (Curonians) Brushed Pottery culture (Lithuanians, Selonians, Latgalians and Semigallians) Milograd culture (Neuri?) Dnieper-Dvina culture (Dnieper Balts) Pomeranian culture (Pomeranian Balts) Bell-shaped burial culture

The Balts or Baltic peoples, defined as speakers of one of the Baltic languages, a branch of the Indo-European language family, are descended from a group of Indo-European tribes who settled the area between the lower Vistula and southeast shore of the Baltic Sea and upper Daugava and Dnieper rivers. The Baltic languages, especially Lithuanian, retain a number of conservative or archaic features, perhaps because the areas in which they are spoken are geographically consolidated and have low rates of immigration.

Some of the major authorities on Balts, such as Kazimieras Būga, Max Vasmer, Vladimir Toporov and Oleg Trubachyov, in conducting etymological studies of eastern European river names, were able to identify in certain regions names of specifically Baltic provenance, which most likely indicate where the Balts lived in prehistoric times. According to Vladimir Toporov and Oleg Trubachyov, the eastern boundary of the Balts in the prehistoric times were the upper reaches of the Volga, Moskva, and Oka rivers, while the southern border was the Seym river. This information is summarized and synthesized by Marija Gimbutas in The Balts (1963) to obtain a likely proto-Baltic homeland. Its borders are approximately: from a line on the Pomeranian coast eastward to include or nearly include the present-day sites of Berlin, Warsaw, Kyiv, and Kursk, northward through Moscow to the River Berzha, westward in an irregular line to the coast of the Gulf of Riga, north of Riga.

However, other scholars such as Endre Bojt (1999) reject the presumption that there ever was such a thing as a clear, single "Baltic Urheimat":

'The references to the Balts at various Urheimat locations across the centuries are often of doubtful authenticity, those concerning the Balts furthest to the West are the more trustworthy among them. (...) It is wise to group the particulars of Baltic history according to the interests that moved the pens of the authors of our sources.'

=== Proto-history ===
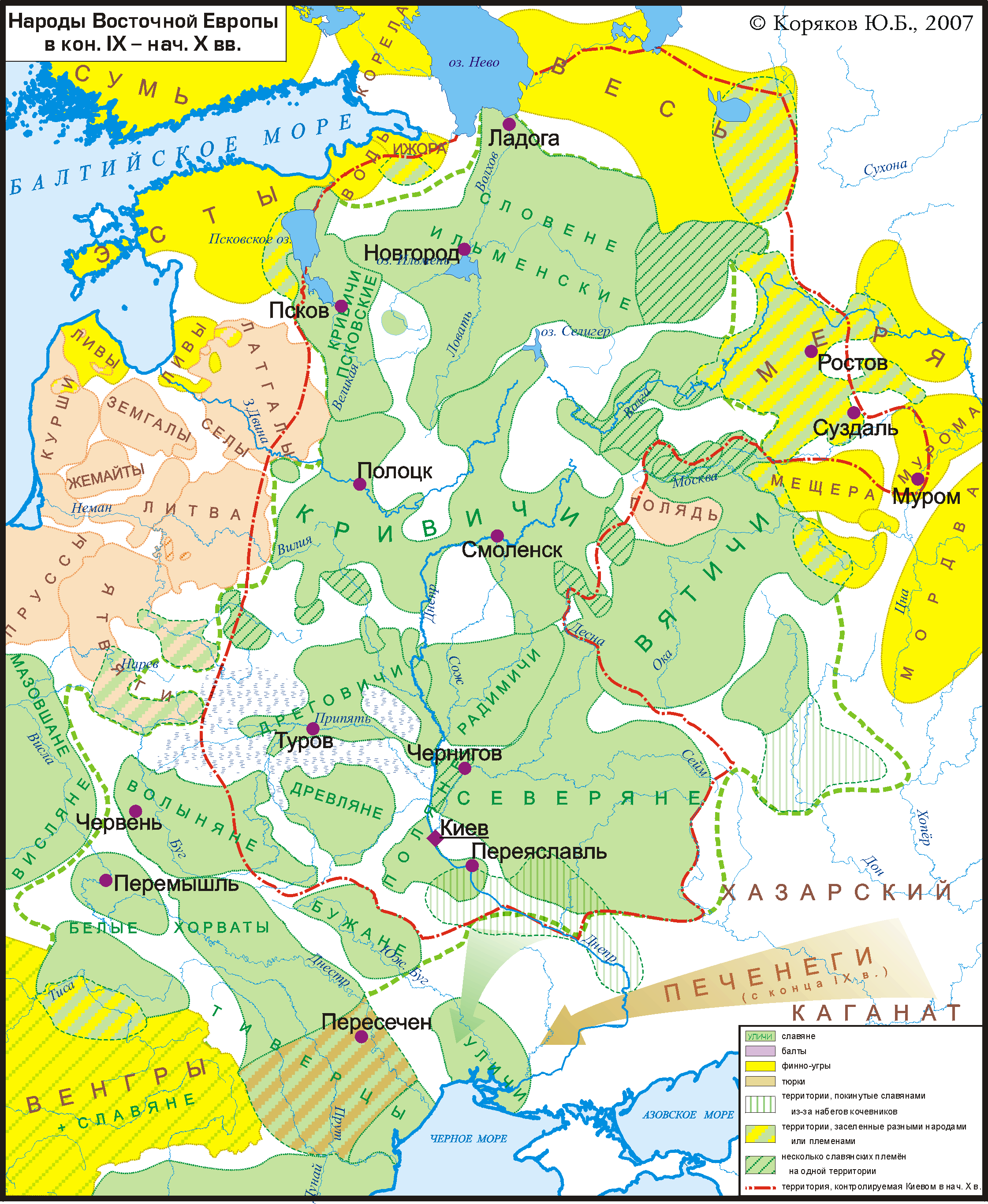
Eastern Europe at the end of 9th century to beginning of 10th century with the last remaining Dnieper Baltic (Eastern Galindian) inhabited area around the modern-day Moscow cut off from the rest of the Baltic people by Krivichs

The time period from the 2nd century to the 5th century AD were a golden age for the Balts. East Prussia and Lithuania had become trade hubs with the Roman Empire and Germanic Tribes, while also growing through increasing industry and agriculture into a cultural center that influenced all of northeast Europe. The era saw the proliferation of Bronze and Iron tools, which had previously been concentrated around the Amber Road, to the whole of the Baltic peoples. Trade routes lead north and east to the Finno-Ugric areas in Livonia, Finland, Northern Russia, and Eastern Russia, passed through the territory occupied by the Baltic tribes. At this time the Baltic peoples territory was second only to that of the Romans.

Germanic peoples lived to the west of the Baltic homelands; by the first century AD, the Goths had stabilized their kingdom from the mouth of the Vistula, south to Dacia. As Roman domination collapsed in the first half of the first millennium CE in Northern and Eastern Europe, large migrations of the Balts occurred — first, the Galindae migrated to around modern day Moscow in the 4th century, and later, East Balts towards the west. In the eighth century, Slavic tribes from the Volga regions appeared. Around the year 400 AD there is evidence of some sort of war which devastated the Northern Balts, many destroyed villages have been found and trade between the Balts and Finno-Ugrians appears to have stopped.

The period from the 5th century to the 9th century, called the Middle Iron Age saw two major events for the Balts. The Slavic migrations began encroaching on the Balts eastern territory starting around 400 AD and Swedish Expansion into the western coasts of Baltic territory starting around 650 AD. These events put pressure on some tribes but overall the Balts continued to develop as a people. Among the Baltic tribes the Prussians and Curonians continued to play leading roles. When the Goths had left the lower Vistula area, Prussians took it over, firmly established their territory where they remained there until the invasion of the Teutonic Order in the thirteenth century. Sudovians and Lithuanians continued in their preexisting lands. With their ornaments and pottery dating from the 2nd to the 10th century are found in present northern Poland as far south as the lower Bug, and the upper Pripet swamps. By the sixth to seventh centuries the Latgalians had expanded into northern Latvia, which previously had been occupied by the western Finno-Ugric tribes. The fall of the Roman Empire saw disruptions to southern trade, including the Amber Road closing for a century until the rule of Theodoric, but they did continue. With letters from Theodoric the great showing the Ostrogoths had good relations with the Prussians.

Over time the Balts became differentiated into West and East Balts. In the fifth century AD parts of the eastern Baltic coast began to be settled by the ancestors of the Western Balts: Brus/Prūsa ("Old Prussians"), Sudovians/Jotvingians, Scalvians, Nadruvians, and Curonians. The East Balts, including the hypothesised Dniepr Balts, were living in modern-day Belarus, Ukraine and Russia.

=== Middle Ages ===
Baltic tribes before the coming of the Teutonic Order (c. 1200 AD). The East Balts are shown in brown hues while the West Balts are shown in green. The boundaries are approximate. Baltic territory was extensive inland.

In the 12th and 13th centuries, internal struggles and invasions by Ruthenians and Poles, and later the expansion of the Teutonic Order, resulted in an almost complete annihilation of the Galindians, Curonians, and Yotvingians. Gradually, Old Prussians became Germanized or Lithuanized between the 15th and 17th centuries, especially after the Reformation in Prussia. The cultures of the Lithuanians and Latgalians/Latvians survived and became the ancestors of the populations of the modern-day countries of Latvia and Lithuania.

By the 13th and 14th centuries, they reached the general area that the present-day Balts and Belarusians inhabit. Many other Eastern and Southern Balts either assimilated with other Balts, or Slavs in the fourth–seventh centuries and were gradually slavicized.

=== Modern era ===
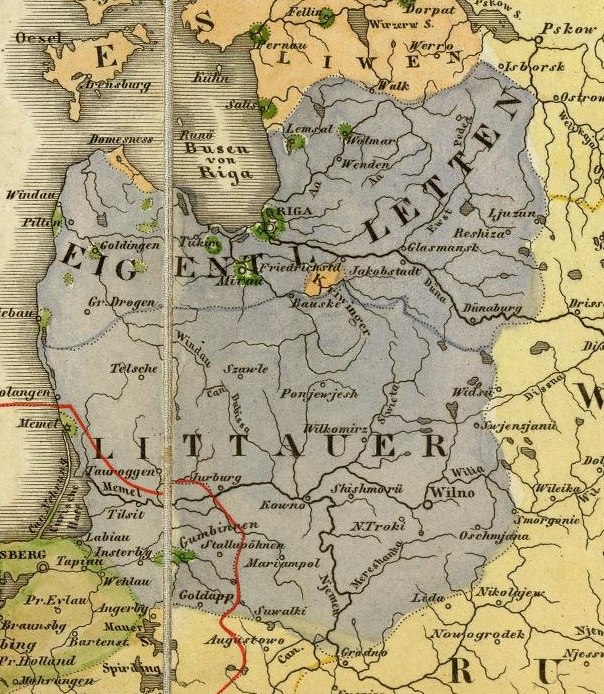
Ethnographic map of Balts in 1847 by Heinrich Berghaus. Lithuanians (Littauer) and Latvians (Letten).

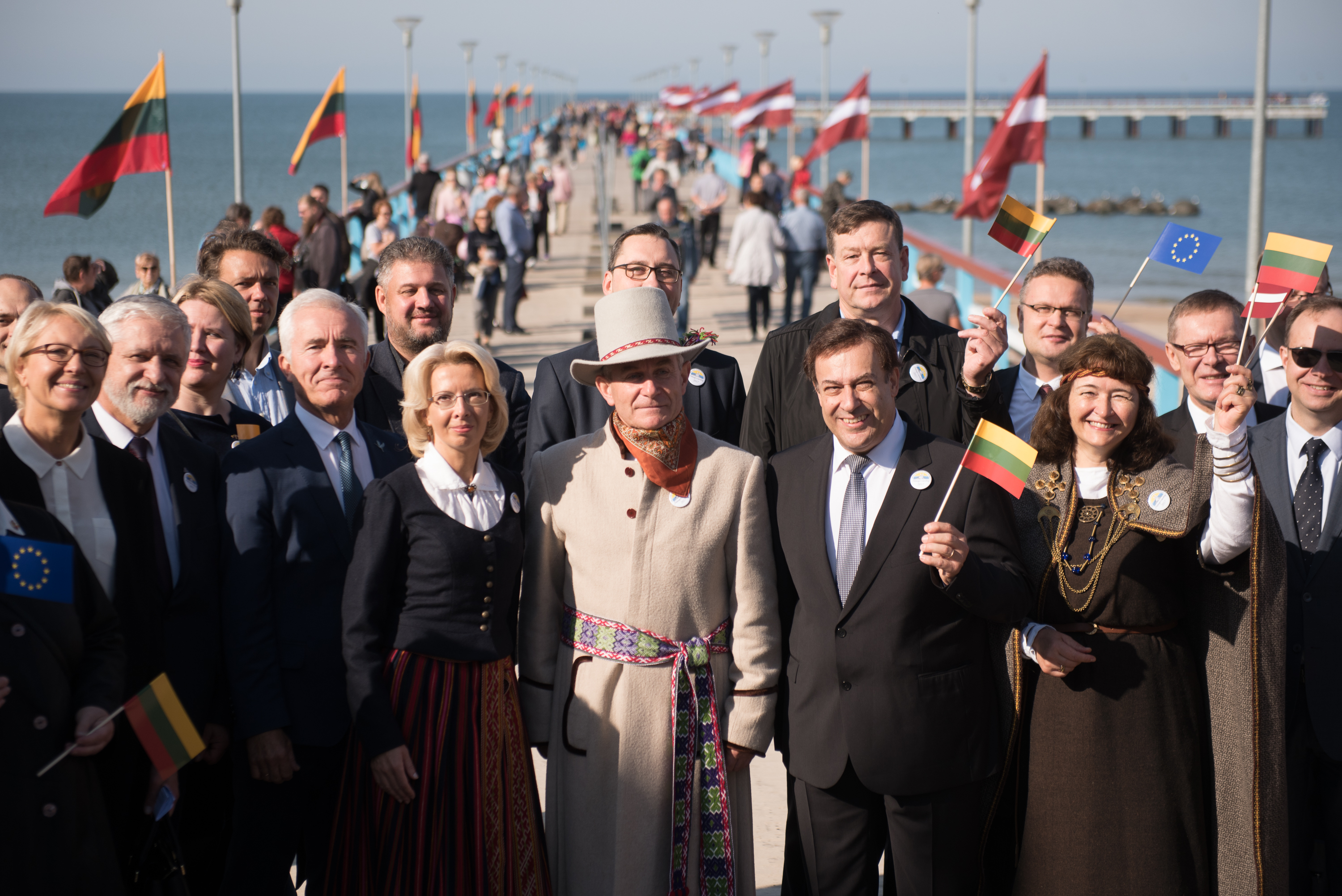
Baltic Unity Day in Palanga, 2017.

In the modern era, the Balts — primarily Lithuanians and Latvians — have sustained a unique cultural and linguistic identity along the eastern shores of the Baltic Sea, speaking the only surviving Eastern Baltic languages, Lithuanian and Latvian, which are among the most conservative Indo‑European tongues and retain archaic features from their Proto‑Indo‑European roots. Following nearly five decades of Soviet rule, Lithuania and Latvia restored their independence in 1990–1991 and subsequently pursued integration with Western institutions, culminating in accession to both the European Union and NATO in 2004. In the 21st century, these two Baltic nations have established stable democracies with parliamentary systems, preserved local languages and traditions, and address common economic, political and cultural priorities.

== Culture ==
The Balts originally practiced Baltic religion. They were gradually Christianized as a result of the Northern Crusades of the Middle Ages. Baltic peoples such as the Latvians, Lithuanians and Old Prussians had their distinct mythologies. The Lithuanians have close historic ties to Poland, and many of them are Roman Catholic. The Latvians have close historic ties to Northern Germany and Scandinavia, and many of them are irreligious. In recent times, the Baltic religion has been revived in Baltic neopaganism.

== Genetics ==
The Balts are included in the "North European" gene cluster together with the Germanic peoples, some Slavic groups (the Poles and Northern Russians) and Baltic Finnic peoples.

Saag et a. (2017) detected that the eastern Baltic in the Mesolithic was inhabited primarily by Western Hunter-Gatherers (WHGs). Their paternal haplogroups were mostly types of I2a and R1b, while their maternal haplogroups were mostly types of U5, U4 and U2. These people carried a high frequency of the derived HERC2 allele which codes for light eye color and possess an increased frequency of the derived alleles for SLC45A2 and SLC24A5, coding for lighter skin color.

Baltic hunter-gatherers still displayed a slightly larger amount of WHG ancestry than Scandinavian Hunter-Gatherers (SHGs). WHG ancestry in the Baltic was particularly high among hunter-gatherers in Latvia and Lithuania. Unlike other parts of Europe, the hunter-gatherers of the eastern Baltic do not appear to have mixed much with Early European Farmers (EEFs) arriving from Anatolia.

During the Neolithic, increasing admixture from Eastern Hunter-Gatherers (EHGs) is detected. The paternal haplogroups of EHGs was mostly types of R1a, while their maternal haplogroups appears to have been almost exclusively types of U5, U4, and U2.

The rise of the Corded Ware culture in the eastern Baltic in the Chalcolithic and Bronze Age is accompanied by a significant infusion of steppe ancestry and EEF ancestry into the eastern Baltic gene pool. In the aftermath of the Corded Ware expansion, local hunter-gatherer ancestry experienced a resurgence.

Haplogroup N reached the eastern Baltic only in the Late Bronze Age, probably with the speakers of the Uralic languages.

Modern-day Balts have a lower amount of EEF ancestry, and a higher amount of WHG ancestry, than any other population in Europe. (Note: "Baltic populations carry the highest proportion of WHG ancestry of all Europeans, supporting the theory that the hunter-gatherer population of this region left a lasting genetic impact on subsequent populations.")

== List of Baltic peoples ==
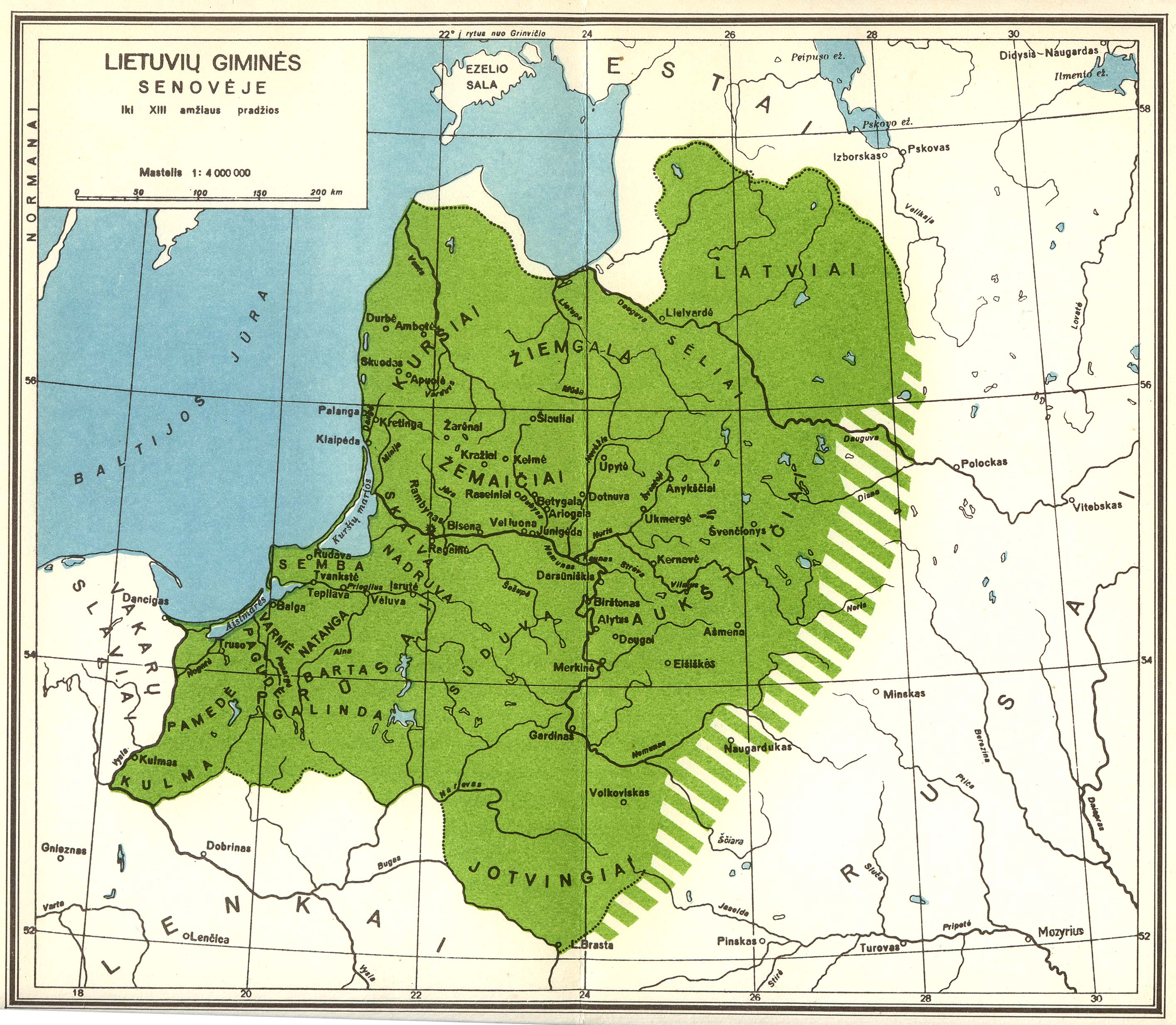
Lithuanian tribes in antiquity until the beginning of the 13th century by Adolfas Šapoka

Modern-day Baltic peoples

- Eastern Baltic peoples
  - Latvians
    - Latgalians
  - Lithuanians
    - Aukštaitians ("highlanders")
    - Samogitians ("lowlanders")

== See also ==
- Eastern Baltic languages
- Western Baltic languages
- Baltic studies
- Baltic Unity Day
