= Western Baltic =

Western Baltic or West Baltic may refer to the:

- western part of the Baltic Sea region, or the
- Western Baltic languages, associated with the
- Western Baltic cultures.
