= Sasna =

Region of ancient Prussia

Sasna on an administrative map of Poland

Sasna or Sassen (German: Sassen; Latin: terra Sossinensis; Lithuanian: Sasna; Polish: ziemia sasińska or Saska) was one of the regions of ancient Prussia. It is now located in northern Poland.

== Etymology ==
Variations of the region's name include Sasna, Sassen, Sasno, Soysim, Sossen, Sassen, Szossen, and Czossin. Its name is traditionally derived from sasnis the Old Prussian word for hare.

== History ==
It is first mentioned as terra Soysim in a 1267 document written by King Ottokar II of Bohemia. It was a small and scarcely inhabited territory roughly between Galindia and Lubavia. Before the arrival of the Teutonic Knights, it was plundered by Masovians and its inhabitants moved northward. It was first governed from Dzierzgoń before its own administrative center was set up at Ostróda.

Sasna was included within the Duchy of Prussia in 1525 and later composed the Kreise Osterode and Neidenburg of East Prussia. In 1945, following World War II, the region became part of Poland.
