= Dnieper Balts =

Historical Baltic ethnicity that existed from millennia B.C. until the Early Middle Ages

Baltic archaeological cultures in the Iron Age from 600 BC to 200 BC with Dnieper-Dvina culture in brown

The Dnieper Balts were a subgroup of the Balts that lived in the Dnieper river basin for millennia until the Late Middle Ages, when they were partly destroyed and partly assimilated by the Slavs by the 13th century. To the north and northeast of the Dnieper Balts were the Volga Finns, and to the southeast and south were the ancient Iranians, the Scythians.

The Dnieper Balts have been studied by the Russian archeologist Valentin Sedov, the Lithuanian linguist Kazimieras Būga, the German linguist Max Vasmer, and the Russian linguists Vladimir Toporov and Oleg Trubachyov.

== History ==
In the early 20th century, the Lithuanian linguist Kazimieras Būga showed that essentially all names in the upper Nemunas and upper Dnieper basins were Baltic. In 1962, the Russian linguists Vladimir Toporov and Oleg Trubachyov, in their work, the "Linguistic analysis of the hydronyms of the Upper Dnieper region" (Russian: Лингвистический анализ гидронимов Верхнего Поднепровья), demonstrated that more than a thousand names in the Dnieper basin were of Baltic origin, due to their morphology and etymology.

The former ethnic Balticness of the Dnieper basin is evidenced by numerous archaeological finds, as well as hydronyms. For example, the hydronyms Yauza, Khimka and Moskva, are of Baltic origin according to Toporov. In the late Bronze Age, the Balts lived in territories from what is now the western border of Poland to the Ural Mountains. However, some propose a smaller territory of Baltic inhabitation from the Vistula in the west to at least as far as Moscow in the east and as far south as Kyiv.

=== Ancient history ===
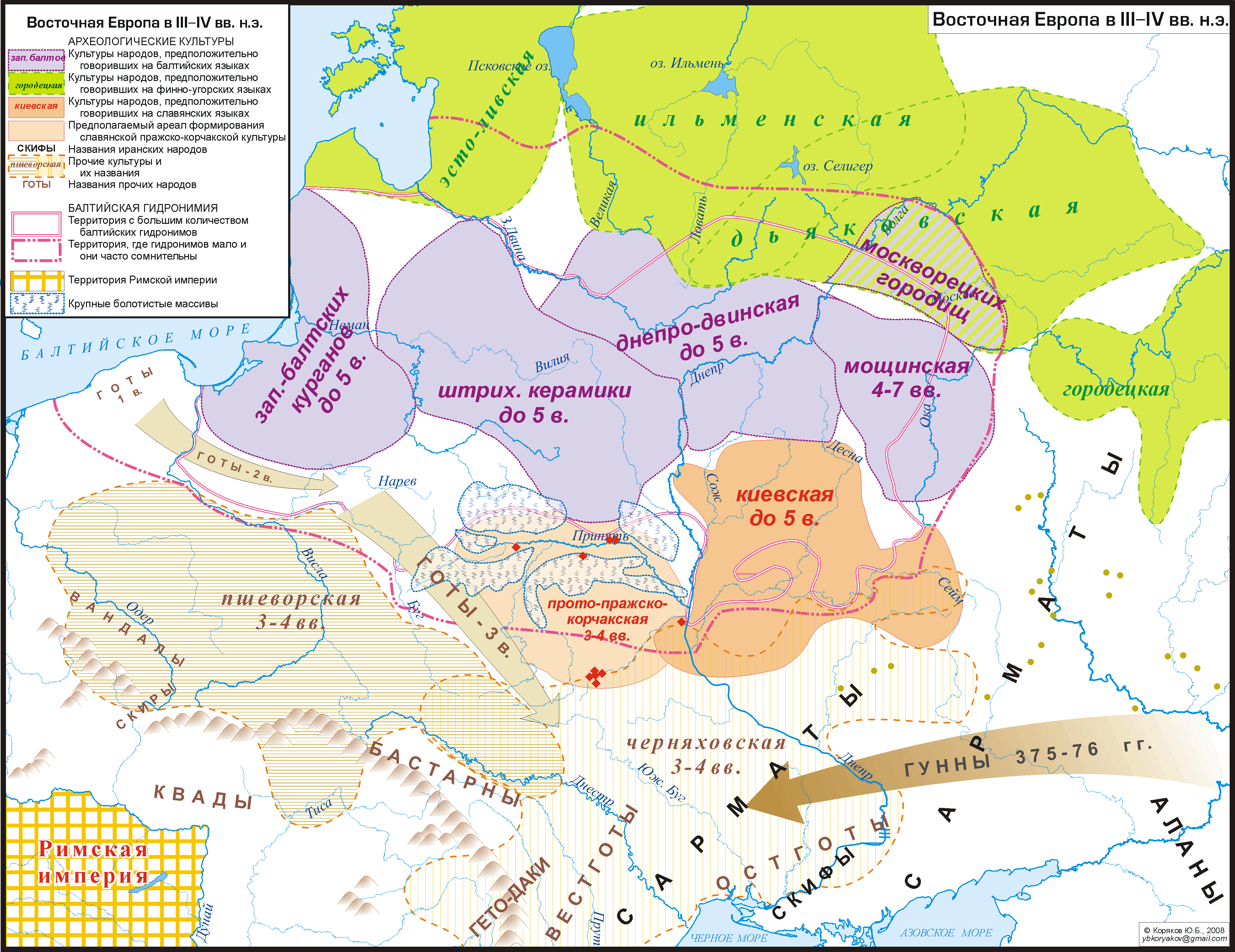
Baltic archeological cultures (in purple) at the end of 3rd century to beginning of 4th century between Slavic (in brown) and Finno-Ugric archeological cultures (in green)

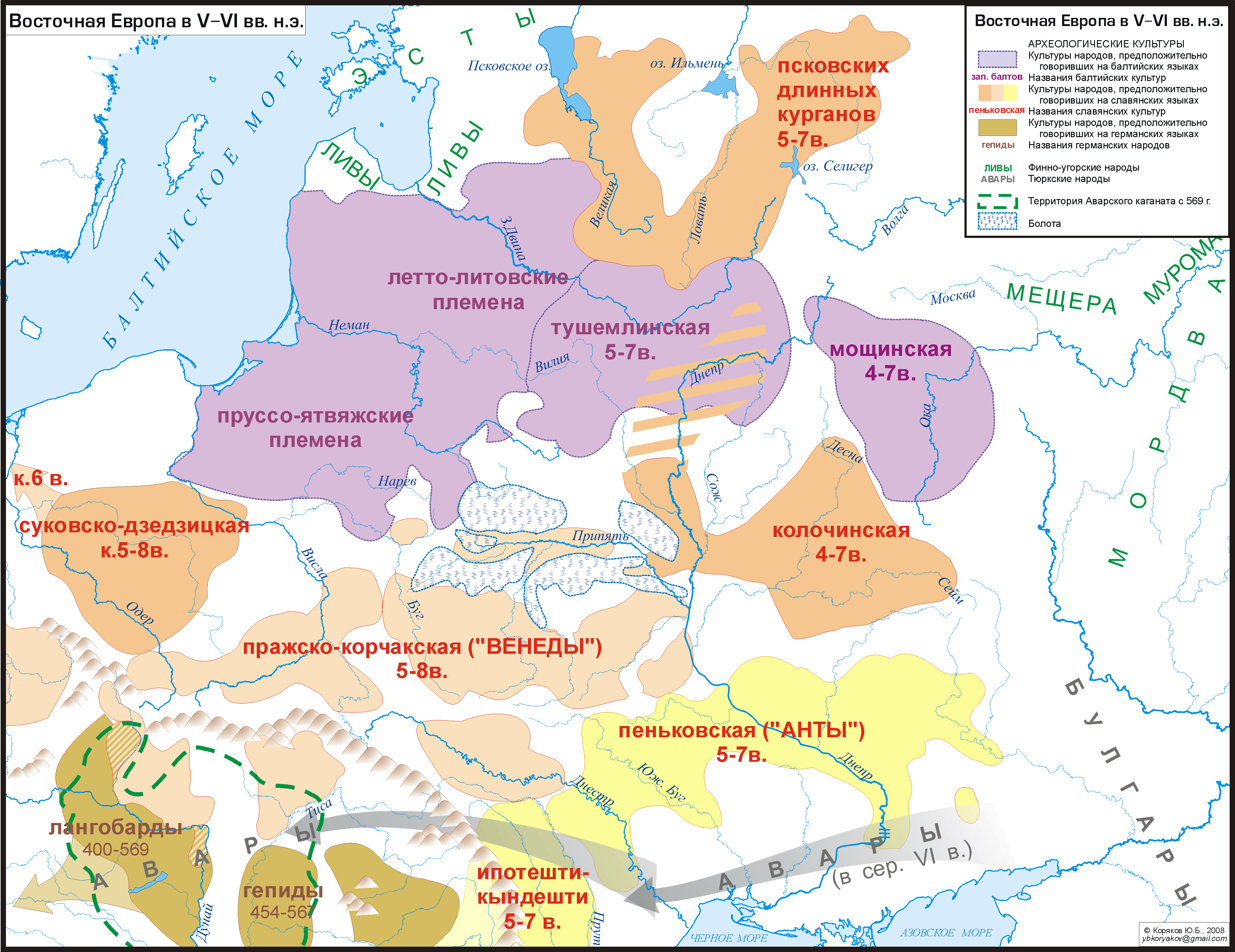
Baltic archeological cultures (in purple) at the end of 5th century to 7th century between Slavic archeological cultures (in light brown)

Various archeological monuments and the prevalence of Baltic hydronyms indicate that by the end of the Neolithic period (c. 3rd to 2nd millennium BC), there were several closely related, at least hypothetically Baltic, cultures in Central and Eastern Europe, which were the Pamariai, (Late) Narva, and (Late) Nemunas cultures. The earliest of them is the Pamariai culture, which covered only a narrow part of the southeastern coast of the Baltic Sea.

During the Bronze (c. 2nd to 1st millennium BC) and Iron (c. 1st millennium BC to 1st millennium AD) Ages, in the lands to the east and south of modern-day Lithuania and Latvia, there were Baltic (Late) Narva and the Brushed Pottery cultures (the areas of these two cultures included the east of present-day Lithuania and Latvia), the Dnieper-Daugava culture, Milograd, Yukhniv and the later Dyakovo cultures.

In the 3rd and 5th centuries AD, the aforementioned Baltic cultures of the Dnieper, Daugava and Oka basins transformed into the Kolochin, Tushemlia and Moshchiny cultures, which existed until the 8th–10th centuries. This transformation was due to the strong influence of the culture of the Western Balts (of the Zarubintsy culture), which moved from the territory of what is now Poland deep into the Dnieper basin as early as the 2nd and 1st centuries BC.

Moshchiny culture is considered to be the ancestor of the Eastern Galindians, who lived in the lands near Moscow and within the Protva river basin.

=== Slavic invasion ===
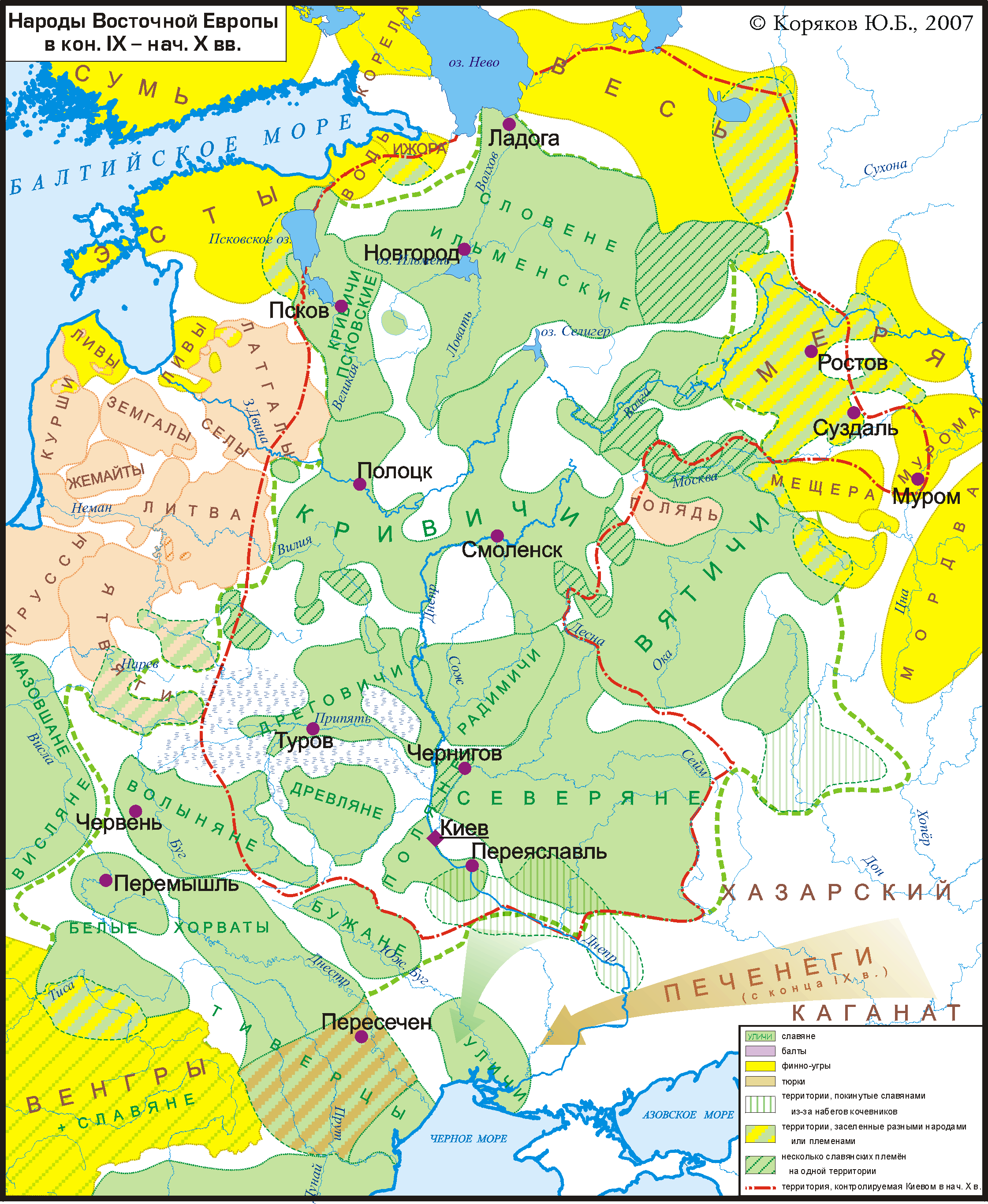
Eastern Europe at the end of 9th century to beginning of 10th century with the last remaining Dnieper Baltic inhabited area around the modern-day Moscow cut off from the rest of the Baltic people by Krivichs

In the middle of the 1st millennium, Slavs began to invade the Baltic territory of the Dnieper Balts along the Dnieper and its tributaries. In the 7th century, the Slavs, that previously only lived in Right-bank Ukraine, started invading the Baltic lands in the eastern Dnieper basin. Since the 7th and 8th centuries, the linguistic and cultural Slavicisation of Dnieper Balts was accelerated by the conversion of the multilingual tribes living in Ruthenia to Eastern Orthodoxy. By the early 9th century, only small numbers of Slavs had gone into Upper Dnieper and the majority were still Balts, with the Slavs mostly settling near Gnezdovo.

Some researchers believe that after the Christianization of Kievan Rus' in 988, part of the Dnieper Balts retreated westwards, eventually merging into Lithuanians and Latgalians. In the 9th and 10th centuries, the majority of the Dnieper Balts were separated from the other Balts living in the west by Slavic migrants moving north on the Dnieper banks. In the 11th and 12th centuries, out of the Dnieper Balts, only the Eastern Galindians remained undestroyed by the eastern Slavs.

The Lithuanian professor Zigmas Zinkevičius writes that:

It is thought that the Dnieper Balts, just as the other Balts living to the east from present-day Lithuania and Latvia, had an important influence on the Slavs who moved to these lands and the formation of East Slavic as a separate linguistic group.

== Religion ==
According to some researchers, the pagan religion of the Dnieper Balts included the veneration of pillars with bear heads.

== Sources ==
- Toporov, Vladimir (1972). "«Baltica» Подмосковья" ["Baltica" of the Moscow Region]. Балто-славянский сборник [Balto-Slavonic collection] (PDF) (in Russian). Moscow: Nauka. pp. 217–280.
- Mallory, J. P.; Adams, Douglas Q. (1997). Encyclopedia of Indo-European culture. London: Fitzroy Dearborn Publishers. ISBN 9781884964985.
- Fortson, Benjamin (2004). Indo-European Language and Culture: An Introduction (PDF). Padstow: Blackwell Publishing.
- Gimbutas, Marija (1963). The Balts. London: Thames and Hudson. Archived from the original on 23 August 2007.
- Girininkas, Algirdas (2009). Lietuvos archeologija (in Lithuanian). Vol. I – Akmens amžius. Vilnius: Versus aureus. ISBN 9789955342144.
- Zinkevičius, Zigmas (2022). "Dniepro baltai". VLE (in Lithuanian). Archived from the original on 2022-05-13.
- Vitkūnas, Manvydas; Zabiela, Gintautas (2017). "Toliausiai į rytus: Dniepro baltų piliakalniai" [Furthest to the east: Dnieper Balt hillforts]. Baltų pilkalniai: nežinomas paveldas (in Lithuanian). Lietuvos Archeologijos Draugija.

== See also ==
- Eastern Galindians
- Neuri
