= Moshchiny culture =

Archaeological culture in western Russia

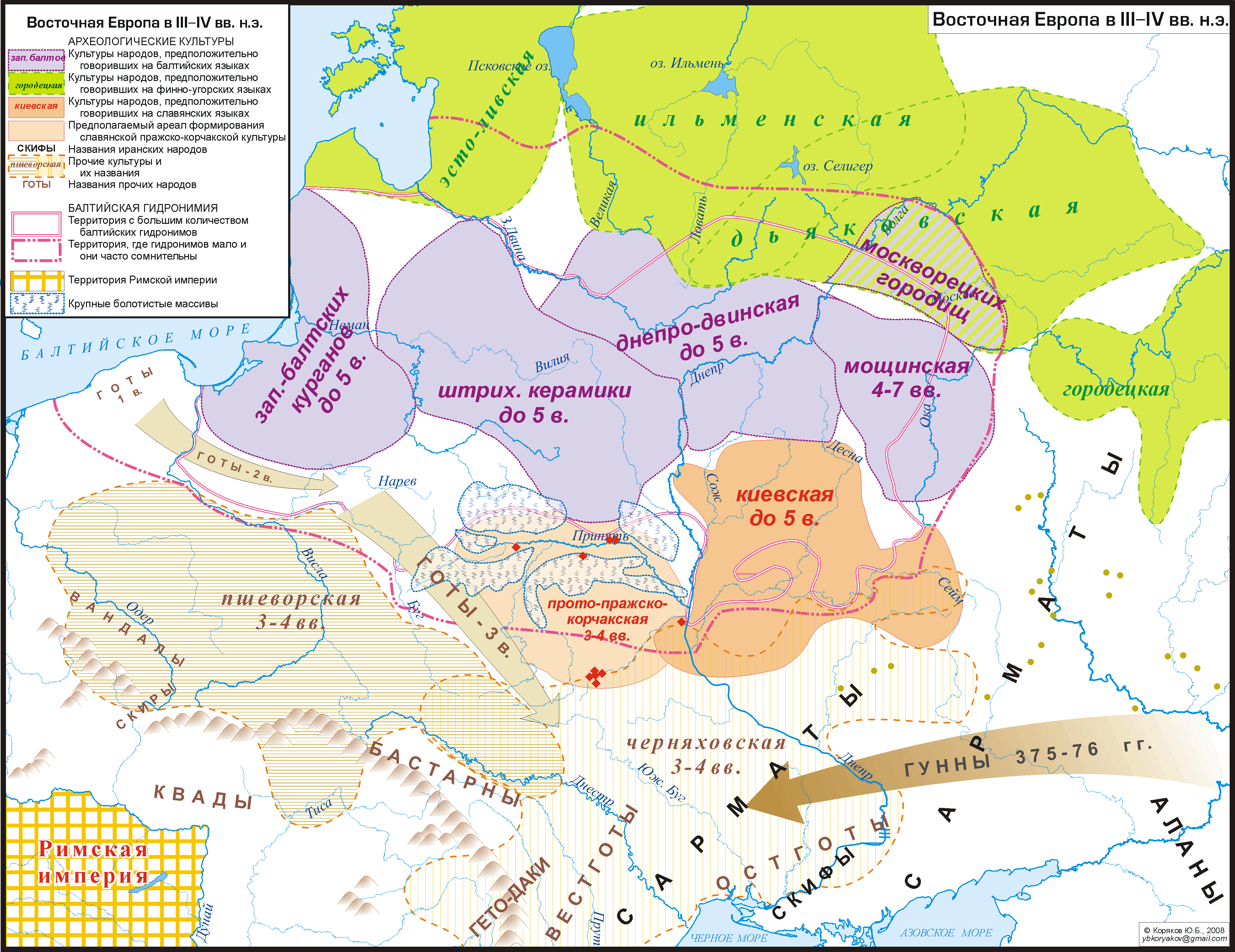
4th Century Baltic Cultures (purple). Moshchiny culture (eastern area)

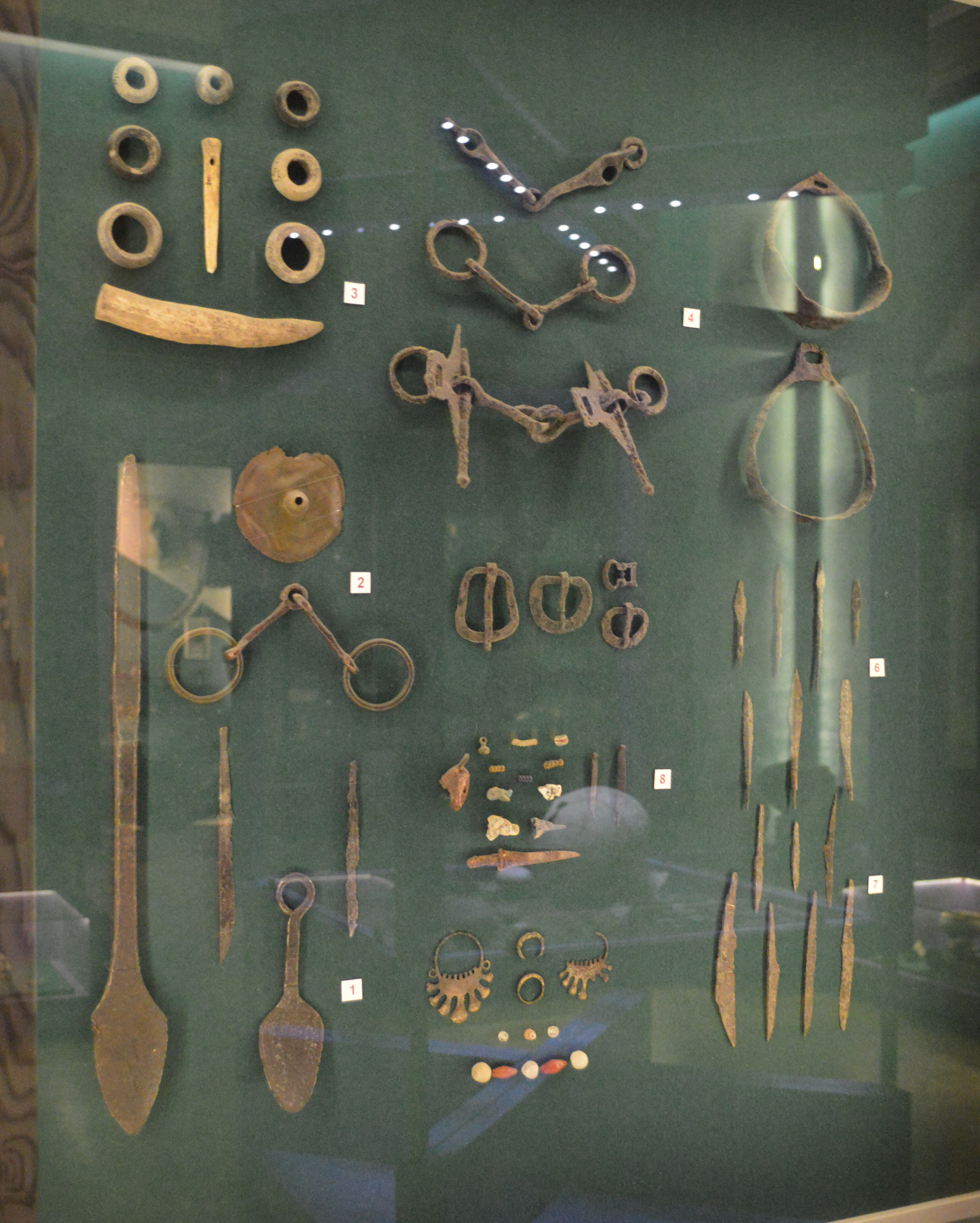
Moshchiny and Romny culture artefacts, 7th - early 11th c.

The Moshchiny culture (Russian: Мощинская культура) was an archaeological culture of the Iron Age from the 4th to the 7th century in present-day western Russia.

== Distribution area ==
The settlement area was located in the forest areas at the upper Dnepr and the upper Oka in today's Russian Oblast Kaluga, Tula, Oryol and Smolensk.

It is named after a settlement near the village Moshchiny (Russian: Мощины) in the Mosalsky District in the Kaluga Oblast.

== Genesis ==
The Moshchiny culture emerged in the 4th century from the Yukhnov culture, with influences from Zarubintsy culture due to immigration. Moshchiny culture is related to the Dnieper-Dvina culture.

== Material culture ==
Agriculture and livestock were nutritional basis. The settlements were mostly fortified.

The ceramic had a smooth surface with bronze ornaments. It was hand-molded. Bronze and iron processing were highly developed.

Mortuary fire was buried in burial mounds.

== Cultural changes ==
For the period from the 9th century, the possibly Baltic-Slavic origin of the Vyatichi is mentioned in the western part of the area. For the 11th century on the Oka the probably Baltic tribe of Galindians (in particular Eastern Galindians ).

== See also ==
- Dniepr Balts

== Literature ==
- (in German) Matthias Albani Der Brockhaus Archäologie: Hochkulturen, Grabungsstätten, Funde Publisher Brockhaus, 671 pages, 2009 ISBN 978-3-7653-3321-7
- G.A. Massalitina: Современное состояние изучения мощинской культуры. Оки связующая нить ( The current status of research on Moschinsky culture Oka .) In: (Red.) EE Fomtschenko: Археология Среднего Поочья: Сборник материалов Второй региональной научно-практической конференции (Ступино, 18 февраля 2009 г.) ( Archeology of the Central Oka region Materials of the second regional scientific-practical conference (Studino, February 18, 2009) ). Moscow 2009, pp. 38–43
