= Milograd culture =

Archaeological culture on present-day Belarus and Ukraine

- Geographical range: Southern Belarus and Northeastern Ukraine
- Period: Iron Age
- Dates: c. 700 BC – c. 100
- Preceded by: Trzciniec culture
- Followed by: Zarubintsy culture

Baltic cultures from 600 to 200 BC: Sambian-Nothangian group Western Masurian group (Galindians) Eastern Masurian group (Yotvingians) Lower Neman and West-Latvian group (Curonians) Brushed Pottery culture Milograd culture Plain-Pottery culture/Dnepr-Dvina culture Pomeranian culture Bell-shaped burials group

The Milograd culture (also spelled Milahrad or Mylohrad, also known as Pidhirtsi culture on Ukrainian territory) is an archaeological culture, lasting from about the 7th century BC to the 1st century AD. Geographically, it corresponds to present day southern Belarus and northern Ukraine, in the area of the confluence of the Dnieper and the Pripyat, north of Kyiv. Their ethnic origin is uncertain, but likely to be either Baltic or Early Slavic. The town of Milahrad (Belarusian: Мілаград), after which the culture is named, is located in the Gomel Region of Belarus.

This culture is identified with the Neuri of Herodotus. The bearers of this archaeological culture are considered to Slavs, Balts, or Balto-Slavs. It is genetically related to the Sosnytsia and Tszynets cultures.

The Milograd culture was over time strongly influenced by the culture of the Podkles-Pomeranian tribes, who came from the northwest and, together with the local Milograd-Podhirtsi tribes, later formed the Zarubynet culture in this territory. In the north, part of the territory of the Milograd culture became part of the Brushed Pottery culture of the late period.

== Territory of residence ==
This is the culture of the tribes who lived between the middle reaches of the Berezina in the north and the Ros River in the south, the Western Bug in the west and the Iput River in the east. This is the modern territory of Southern Belarus and Ukrainian Polissya. The territory of the Milograd culture bordered the Dnieper-Dvina culture in the north, the Yukhniv culture in the east, and the Pomeranian culture in the west. In the south and southeast, it bordered the Scythians.

In the 1950s, O. Melnykivska, having studied the Mylograd settlement in the Rechytsky district of the Gomel region (Belarus), singled out the Mylograd culture among the monuments of the Early Iron Age. At the same time, archaeologist V. Danylenko discovered monuments of this culture in the village of Pidhirtsi, Obukhiv district of the Kyiv region.

== See also ==
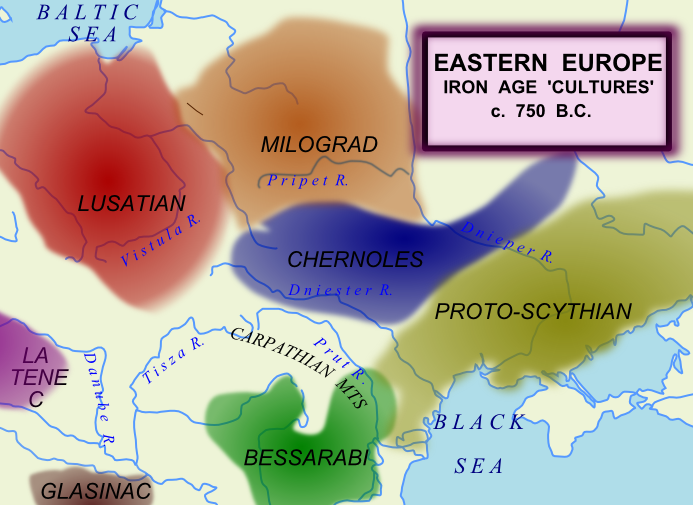
Archaeological cultures, Eastern Europe, c. mid-8th century BC

- Middle Dnieper culture
- Pomeranian culture
- Zarubintsy culture
- Przeworsk culture (Middle and Upper Vistula with the right bank of the Oder)
- Chernoles culture (Pripyat basin, Middle Dnieper and part of Upper Dnieper)
