= Baltic Unity Day =

Observance every September 22 in Lithuania and Latvia

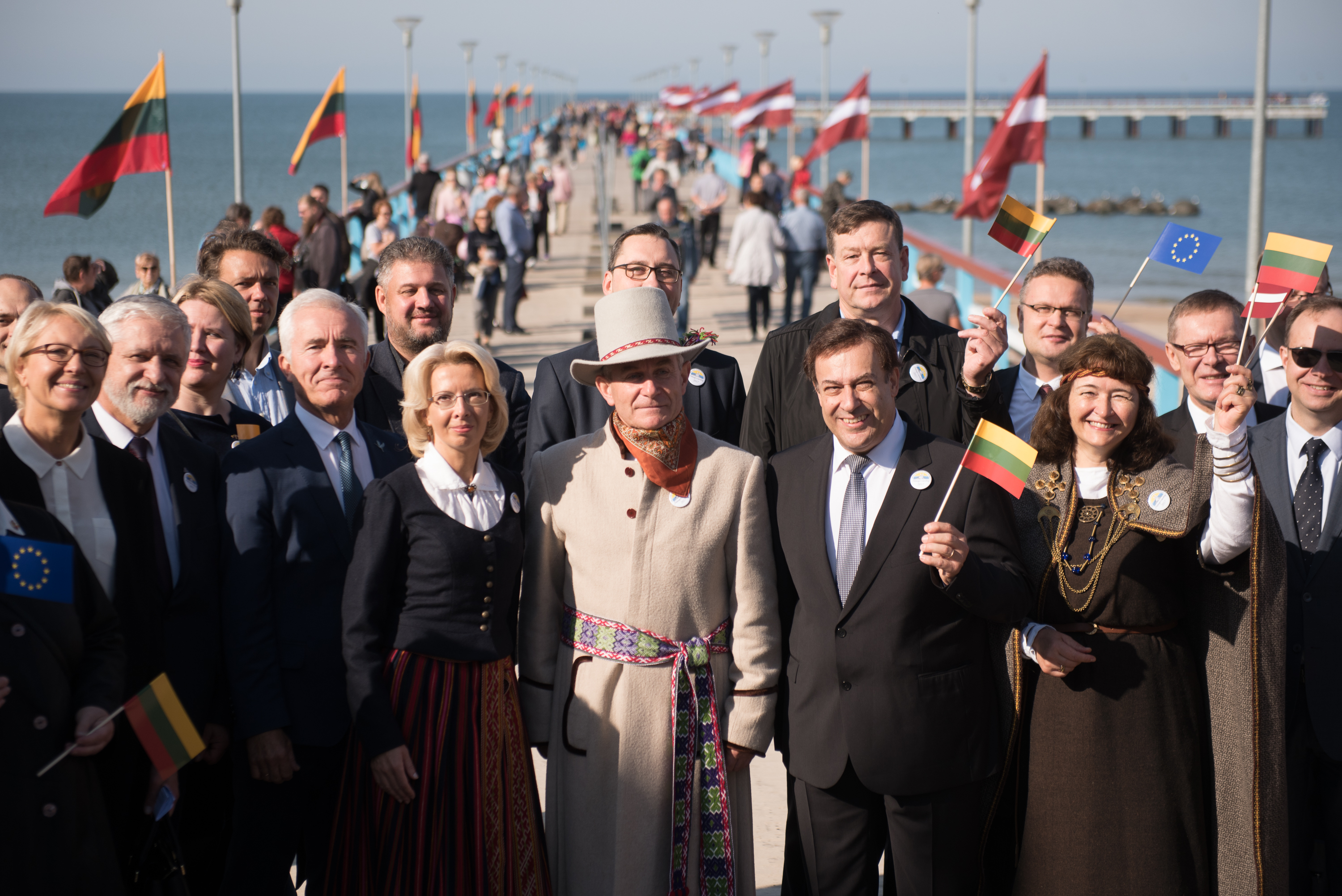
- Baltic Unity Day in Palanga in 2017
- Observed by: Lithuania and Latvia
- Significance: The joint pagan Samogitian and Semigallian forces decisively defeating the Livonian Brothers of the Sword at the 1236 Battle of Saule
- Celebrations: Concerts, artisan fairs, art exhibitions, film screenings, sports competitions, workshops
- Date: September 22
- Frequency: Annual

Baltic Unity day or Day of Baltic Unity (Lithuanian: Baltų vienybės diena, Latvian: Baltu vienības diena) is a commemorative day celebrated on September 22 in Lithuania and Latvia, as well as Latvian and Lithuanian communities abroad. It was recognized as such in 2000 by both the Seimas of Lithuania and Saeima of Latvia commemorating the 1236 Battle of Saule, where the joint pagan Samogitian and Semigallian forces decisively defeated the Livonian Brothers of the Sword.

The day is marked with various events all over Latvia and Lithuania, with the main events taking place in one city on a rotating basis: Rokiškis (2015), Liepāja (2016), Palanga (2017), and Jelgava (2018). In 2017 a special "Balts' Award" was established to be awarded to individuals for the promotion of Latvian and Lithuanian languages, literature, and historic research. In 2018, Latvian Lithuanian professor and linguist Laimute Balode became the first recipient of the prize.
