= Brushed Pottery culture =

Bronze Age culture in the area of Lithuania, Belarus, and southeastern Latvia

- Geographical range: Europe
- Period: Bronze Age
- Dates: c. 1000 BC — c. 500 AD
- Preceded by: Narva culture, Corded Ware culture
- Followed by: Balts

The Brushed Pottery culture was a European Bronze Age archaeological culture found in present-day eastern Lithuania, Belarus, and southeastern Latvia. It succeeded the Neolithic Narva culture. It got its name from its characteristic flat-bottomed pottery, the outer surface of which is generally brushed with strokes, believed to be applied with bundles of straw or grass during pottery making.

== Formation ==
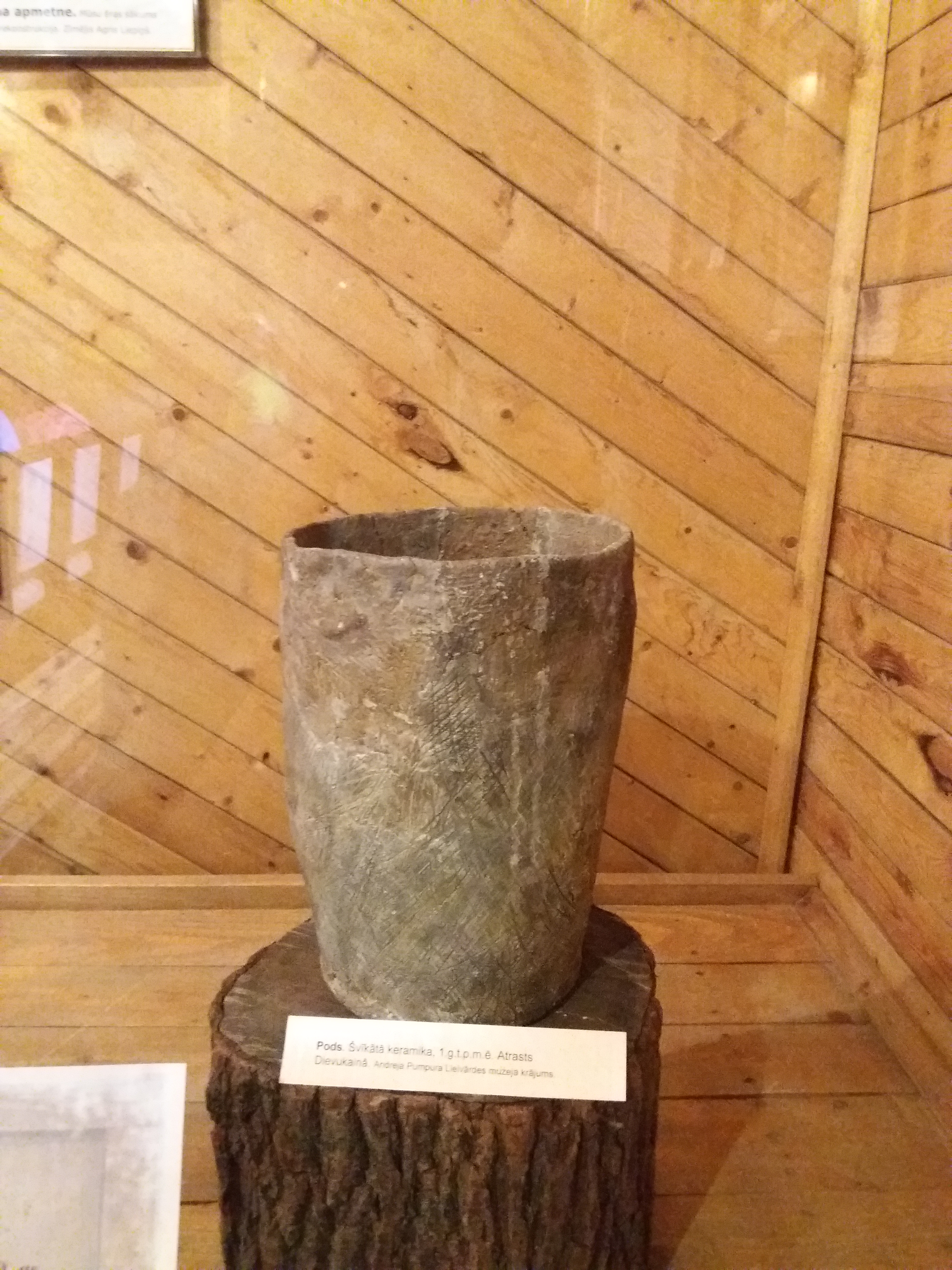
Brushed Pottery pot from Dievukalns, Lielvarde, Latvia, 1st century BC

Baltic groups during the Early Iron Age (600–400 BC and later) based on archaeological finds, according to Gimbutas 1963. The Sembian-Notangian group The west Masurian group, probably connected with the later Prussian Galindians The east Masurian or Sudovian group (Jatvingian) group The lower Neman and western Latvian group connected with the early Curonians (Kurshians) The Brushed Pottery group ancestral to Lithuanians, Selians, Lettigallians and Semigallians The 'Milograd' group of the 7th–6th centuries BCE. The Plain Pottery culture to be identified with the easternmost Balts The 'Face-urn' group of Pomerania and lower Vistula Expansion area of the 'Bell-grave' group, successor of the 'Face-urn' group, in the 4th and 3rd centuries BCE

The oldest settlements considered to be a part of Early Brushed Pottery culture are dated to 1300-1100 BC, and are found along the rivers Neris and Šventoji. It replaced the Narva culture, which existed in the region to 1700 BC. While traditionally it is believed that the Narva culture was replaced by Indo-European influence carried by Corded Ware culture, this viewpoint has been challenged, and a distinction is made between Corded Ware-influenced Western Baltic culture, and separate Brushed Pottery culture.

== Technology and culture ==
The Brushed Pottery culture was conservative and changed very little during its lifespan, only adopting new technologies (such as bronzeworking and ironworking) from nearby cultures.

The most recognizable feature of the culture are hillforts, which were first established circa 1000 BC. They are believed to have been able to house from 80 to 120 inhabitants, in rectangle shaped houses of wooden pole construction, and were fortified. 110 hillforts belonging to Brushed Pottery culture have been found in Eastern Lithuania. The most studied Brushed Pottery culture hillforts are Nevieriškė, Narkūnai and Sokiškiai.

Extensive findings of stone axes and bones of sheep, pigs, cattle as well as hunted animals in hillfort excavations show that Brushed Pottery peoples engaged in a mix of hunting-gathering and animal husbandry, with less focus on agriculture. Some Brushed Pottery hillforts show signs of intensive metallurgy, such as numerous clay casting molds. Animal bone was used as a substitute for metals and bone tools were used, likely borrowed from late Narva culture, which extensively used bone as raw material.

Very little is known about the burial practices of Brushed Pottery culture, as no graves dated to this culture have been found. Several theories have been suggested to explain this, such as cremation, or exotic burial practices, such as burial at water or burial trees.

== Decline ==
The Brushed Pottery culture disappeared in 3rd-5th centuries AD. According to Aleksiejus Luchtanas, it ended in 3rd century AD after influence from Western Baltic culture, and was replaced by East Lithuanian Kurgan culture and Bantserovo-Tushemliya culture. It is considered to correspond to ancestral Baltic tribes and Proto-Baltic language.

== See also ==
- Corded Ware culture
- Milograd culture
- Pomeranian culture
- Western Baltic culture
