= Vida Marija Čigriejienė =

Lithuanian physician and politician

- Born: Vida Marija Šapokaitė; 4 October 1936 (age 89); Alytus, Lithuania
- Other names: Vida Marija Čigriejienė-Šapokaitė, Vida Marija Šapokaitė-Čigriejienė
- Occupations: Physician, professor, politician
- Years active: 1961–2016
- Relatives: Adolfas Šapoka (uncle)

Vida Marija Čigriejienė (born 4 October 1936) is a Lithuanian physician, politician and professor. Born to teachers in Alytus, in 1941, she was deported along with her mother and sister to the Altai Krai region of the Soviet Union, where they lived in forced exile until 1948. Returning to Lithuania, she completed her education at Kaunas Medical Institute, in 1961. She served as a physician at the district hospital in Kybartai for five years, then at the Central Hospital of Vilkaviškis and the Republican Clinical Hospital in Kaunas. After obtaining her candidate of sciences degree in 1972, she taught and practiced at the Kaunas Medical Institute, becoming a docent in 1982, deputy chief physician of obstetrics and gynecology in 1989, and head of the Obstetrics and Gynecology Clinic in 1991, and a full professor and head of its gynecologic oncology department in 1999. She wrote numerous textbooks and publications during her academic career.

In 2004, Čigriejienė entered politics and joined the conservative Homeland Union, representing the Panemunės district. Re-elected in both 2008 and 2012, she served in the Seimas through 2016. As the oldest elected member of the legislature, she served as the head of the government in both 2008 and 2012 until a prime minister was confirmed. Throughout her tenure, she served on the Committee on Health Affairs and proposed legislation often related to health issues, such as limits on sales of cigarettes and alcohol. She supported legislation for assisted reproduction, abortion, and biomedical research, but opposed gender-affirming surgery and home births. She also opposed reducing pensions and curtailing maternity and paternity leave provisions. In 2016, she broke with the conservative alliance and unsuccessfully ran as an independent for re-election. The following year, she was recognized for her service to Kaunas and Lithuania with the Santaka Medal of Kaunas in the third degree.

== Early life and education ==
Vida Marija Šapokaitė was born on 4 October 1936 in Alytus, Lithuania. Her father was a primary school principal and her mother was a primary school teacher in Alytus. Her uncle was the Lithuanian historian Adolfas Šapoka. In 1940, the Soviet Union began an occupation of the Baltic states. One year later, when she was four years old, Šapokaitė's father underwent an operation on his leg in Kaunas. While he was absent from the home, armed men came to their house on 14 June 1941, and took Šapokaitė, her mother and her younger sister in a forced exile. They were marched with a group of thirty-two people to Barnaul in the Altai Mountains, where they camped until winter. Because of the cold, and sickness, in November, the group was moved to Yuzhny. Although there was little food or warm clothing, there was a kindergarten and primary school in the camp in which the children were allowed to study in Lithuanian. Although their forced exile ended on 9 June 1947, Šapokaitė's mother remained in captivity for another seven months.

Returning to Lithuania in 1948, Šapokaitė attended secondary school in Utena and in 1955, enrolled in medical school at the Kaunas Medical Institute, graduating in 1961. After her marriage to Eugenijus Čigriejus, she had three children – Laima, Petras, Saulius – and began using her husband's surname. (Note: Her surname is variously styled Čigriejien, Šapokaitė-Čigrėjienė, or Čigrėjienė-Šapokaitė.)

== Career ==
=== Medicine (1961–2004) ===
Upon graduating, Čigriejienė worked in the gynaecology and obstetrics department at the district hospital in Kybartai for five years. Then she worked at the Central Hospital of Vilkaviškis until 1967, when she began working at the Republican Clinical Hospital in Kaunas and studying for her candidate's degree. She defended her thesis, Изменения кислотно-щелочного равновесия, гликогена и активности пероксидазы в крови плодов и новорожденных при операции кесарева сечения (Changes in Acid-Base Balance, Glycogen and Peroxidase Activity in the Blood of Fetuses and Newborns during Cesarean Section) at Kaunas Medical Institute in 1972. She worked at the Kaunas Medical Institute, becoming a docent in 1982, deputy chief physician of obstetrics and gynecology in 1989, and head of the Obstetrics and Gynecology Clinic in 1991. After completing her habilitation on premature birth in 1999, Čigriejienė became a full professor at the newly named Kaunas Medical University and head of its gynecologic oncology department.

=== Politics (2004–2016) ===
In 2004, Čigriejienė ran as a candidate for the Seimas, for the Panemunės district. Successful in her bid, she served as part of the Homeland Union on the Committee on Health Affairs between 2004 and 2008 and from 2005 to 2008 on petitions commission and Women Parliamentary Group. Among other issues, she proposed legislation for harsher penalties for people who purchased alcohol or cigarettes for minors, student discounts for transportation fares, and burial regulations. She also pressed for funds to establish an intensive care unit for children at the Second Kaunas Clinical Hospital.

Čigriejienė successfully ran for re-election for the 2008–2012 term of the Seimas, and was the oldest member elected to office. Per the rules of the Seimas, as the eldest member, she presided over the parliament for twelve hours, until the new leader was elected. She retained her post to the Committee on Health Affairs and was appointed as deputy chair of the Commission for Ethics and Procedures in 2008, serving throughout her term. Although a conservative, in 2009, Čigriejienė voted against her alliance's legislation to cut social benefits and reduce pensions, noting that her own pension under the plan would be reduced by eighty-four percent. She also objected to proposed legislation that would lower maternity and paternity leave payments for new parents. Along with Antanas Matulas, she proposed legislation in 2011 to ban gender-affirming surgery, but the proposal was defeated. (Note: Although the ban had widespread public support, the government strategy was based upon integrating Lithuanian policy with that of European human rights legislation. In 2013, Linas Linkevičius, the Minister of Foreign Affairs, signed the Istanbul Convention on Preventing and Combating Violence Against Women and Domestic Violence, barring discrimination on the basis of gender identity and sexual orientation. Signing the convention meant that the intent was for the Seimas to ratify the document; however, as of February 2023, the Seimas had not done so.)

To address the issue of parliamentarians failing to attend sessions Čigriejiene and Algimantas Salamakinas submitted legislation to waive the salary stipend for unexcused absences and establish fixed vacation schedules for all members. They also supported regulations to limit compensation for official car rentals. Other legislation that she supported was a law to legalize assisted reproduction for infertile families. In spite of restrictions of donor sperm, because the small population of the country could lead to children born to close relatives, and of the number of implanted embryos because of the risk to the infants and higher costs associated with multiple births, the proposal did not pass.

After winning her third election for the 2012–2016 term in the Seimas, Čigriejiene was again the presiding member until new leadership was elected. She retained her seat on the Committee on Health Affairs and served on the Petitions Commission throughout the period. In addition, in 2015 and 2016, she returned to the Commission for Ethics and Procedures. In the debates which began in 2013 over a case pending at the European Court of Human Rights, she opposed modifying legislation to allow doctors to assist at home births, stating that the risks did not warrant state funding and restrictions against home deliveries should not be loosened. She proposed legislation along with other lawmakers to provide free vaccinations for influenza. Čigriejiene opposed legislation to allow business entities to register with names that did not use the Lithuanian alphabet, citing that the existing law protected the Lithuanian language.

In 2013, when a ban on abortion was proposed, Čigriejiene was verbally attacked by a priest, Andrius Narbekovas, during the Health Affairs Committee meeting. He made accusations that during demonstrations for students which she had performed, babies were mutilated. Čigriejiene denied his allegations. She acknowledged that she had performed terminations in the Soviet era, but said she had not taught procedures to students. However, she stated that abortion was a complicated issue and various factors had to be weighed. Among them, she cited better courses on sex education so that people understand their roles in reproduction. Although against terminations as a method of birth control or for non-medical reasons, she recognized that without legal safe procedures, illegal abortionists would put women in danger of dying. She supported a woman's right to choose without interference from either the church or state, especially in situations where the mother's life was at risk, or for pregnancy resulting from rape or detection of severe fetal genetic abnormalities, or if the fetus was unable to survive.

Čigriejiene was one of the legislators who proposed a ban on cigarette sales to minors in 2015, and legislation to restrict alcohol sales in residential neighborhoods as well as limiting sales hours to between 10 a.m. and 9 p.m. She supported proposed legislation to modify the Biomedical Research Ethics Law to allow expanded research potential for human and fetal tissue. The law banned creation of embryos for research and prohibited cloning and proposed operational procedures, which had previously not been specified in Lithuanian law. Conflicts with her alliance of the Homeland Union and Lithuanian Christian Democrats emerged when the party announced a shift in the way members would be chosen and a preference to introduce younger legislators. In June 2016, she left the conservative ranks and announced that she would run in the next election as an independent candidate. Her bid for a fourth term was unsuccessful, but she continued to be politically involved speaking out on amendments proposed to the assisted reproduction law. She was honored with the Santaka Medal of Kaunas in the third degree for her services to both Kaunas and Lithuania.

== Selected works ==
Čigriejienė published around 300 publications, which include journal articles and textbooks. Among her works are:

- Čigriejienė, V. M.; Janickienė, R. M. (Regina Viktorija); Sadauskas, Vacys; Tarnauskas, Enrikas; Žukauskas, Jurgis (1990). Ginekologija [Gynecology] (in Lithuanian). Vilnius, Lithuania: Mokslas. ISBN 978-5-420-00489-0.
- Čigriejienė, V. M.; Butylkina, M. (Marija); Samulėnienė, N. (Nijolė) (1993). Akušerija: praktinis vadovas [Midwifery: Practical Guide] (in Lithuanian). Vilnius, Lithuania: Mokslas. ISBN 978-5-420-00906-2.
- Čigriejienė, V. M.; Sadauskas, Vacys (1995). Jūsų mažylis pakeliui į gyvenimą [Your Baby on the Way to Life] (in Lithuanian). Kaunas, Lithuania: Europa. ISBN 978-9986-27-025-6.
- Ališauskas, Jonas; Arlauskienė, Audronė; Baliutavičienė, D. K. (Dalia Kotryna); Butylkina, Marija; Černius, Vitalijus; Čigriejienė, V. M.; et al. (1996). Gimdymo pagalba: vadovėlių leidybos komisijos rekomenduota medicinos specialybių studentams [Assisted Delivery: Recommended for Medical Students by the Textbook Publishing Commission] (in Lithuanian). Vilnius, Lithuania: Avicena. ISBN 978-9986-437-30-7.
- Čigriejienė, V. M.; Sadauskas, Vacys (1998). Kolposkopijos pagrindai [Basics of Colposcopy] (in Lithuanian). Kaunas, Lithuania: Europa. ISBN 978-9986-811-70-1.
- Čigriejienė, V. M. (1998). Priešlaikinis gimdymas [Premature Birth] (in Lithuanian). Kaunas, Lithuania: Kaunas Medical University. ISBN 978-9986-451-35-8.
- Žilinskas, M.-K. (Mindaugas-Kąstyti); Čigriejienės, V, M.; Inčiūra, Arturas (2002). Gimdos kaklelio vėžio diagnostikos ir gydymo pagrindai [Fundamentals of Diagnosis and Treatment of Cervical Cancer] (in Lithuanian). Vilnius, Lithuania: UAB Vaistu Zinios. ISBN 978-9955-511-17-5.
