= Western Baltic culture =

Prehistoric culture in northern Europe

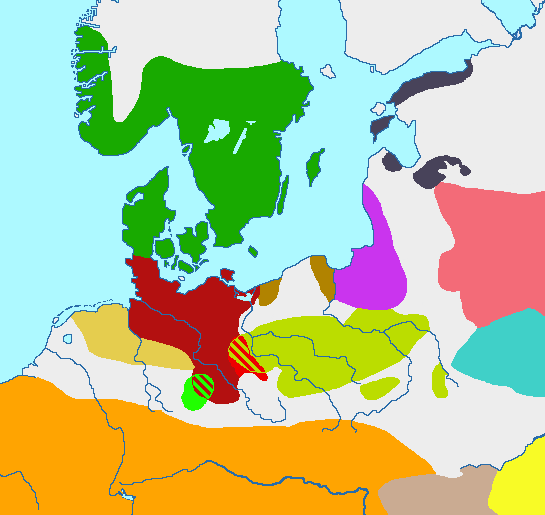
Cultures in Northern and Central Europe during the late Iron Age. pale green (centre) – Przeworsk culture dark green – Nordic group dark red – Jastorf culture yellow – Harpstedt-Nienburger group orange – Celtic groups brown – Oksywie culture pink – East Baltic forest zone cultures magenta – West Baltic cairn culture turquoise – Milogrady culture black – Estonian group

The Western Baltic culture (Lithuanian: Vakarų baltų kultūra; Polish: Kultura zachodniobałtyjska also known as krąg zachodniobałtyjski (West Baltic circle), Russian: Западнобалтская культура, romanized: Zapadnobaltskaya kul'tura) was the westernmost branch of the Balts, representing a distinct archaeological culture of the Bronze Age and Iron Age, along the southern coast of the Baltic Sea. It is a zone of several small archaeological cultures that were ethnically Baltic and had similar cultural features (e.g. similar monuments or some features of the funeral rite). They included tribes such as the Old Prussians, Galindians, Yotvingians (or Sudovians) and Skalvians, in addition to the little-known Pomeranian Balts or Western Balts proper, in the area now known as Pomerania.

== History ==
Most of the Western Balts arose from the West Baltic barrow culture dating back to the early Iron Age. The Western Baltic culture includes:

- Bogaczewo culture (from the end of c. 1st millennium B.C. to the end of the 4th c. A.D., possibly even the end of the 5th c.)
- Sudovian culture (from the mid-2nd c. A.D. to the end of the 6th c.)
- Sambian-Notangian culture (from the end of the 1st c. A.D. to the beginning of the 6th c.)
- Olsztyn group (from the end of the 5th c. A.D. to the mid-7th c. or the beginning of the 8th c.)
- Elbląg group (from the end of the 5th c. A.D. to the mid-7th c.)
- Low German group
- West Lithuanian group
- Central Lithuanian group

=== Geography, chronology and ancient mentions ===
According to Marija Gimbutas, the Baltic culture of the Early and Middle Bronze Age covered a territory which, at its maximal extent, included "all of Pomerania almost to the mouth of the Oder, and the whole Vistula basin to Silesia in the south-west" before the spread of the Lusatian culture to the region and was inhabited by the ancestors of the later (Baltic) Old Prussians.

The Western Baltic cultures were located to the north-east of the Wielbark and Przeworsk cultures, between the Pasłęka and Daugava rivers. They lived there from the end of c. 1st millennium B.C. until the mid-7th century. According to Tacitus, these areas were inhabited by the Aesti, while Ptolemy speaks of the Galindians and the Sudines.

== Art and structures ==
The Balts decorated their pots by creating "deep incisions and ridges around the neck." Baltic graves consisted of huts made out of timber, or stone cists with floors of pavement "encircled by timber posts".

== See also ==
- Early history of Pomerania
- Dniepr Balts

== Sources ==
- Gimbutas, Marija (1963). The Balts. Thames and Hudson.
- Kaczanowski, Piotr; Kozłowski, Janusz Krzysztof (1998). Wielka Historia Polski (in Polish). Vol. I - Najdawniejsze dzieje ziem polskich (do VII w.). Kraków: Fogra. ISBN 83-85719-34-2.
- Kozłowski, Janusz K. (1999). Encyklopedia historyczna świata (in Polish). Vol. I: Prehistoria, praca zbiorowa. Kraków: Agencja Publicystyczno-Wydawnicza Opres. ISBN 83-85909-51-6.

== See also ==
- Tyurin, E.A. "Вооружение всадников самбийско-натангийской и прусской культур I-VI вв. н.э." [Armament of horsemen of the Sambian-Natangian and Prussian cultures of the 1st-6th centuries A.D.]. www.simvolika.org (in Russian).
- Kulakov, V.I. "Памятники археологии Калининградской области" [Archaeological monuments of the Kaliningrad region] (in Russian). Archived from the original on 2010-12-14.
