= Adolfas Šapoka =

Lithuanian historian (1906–1961)

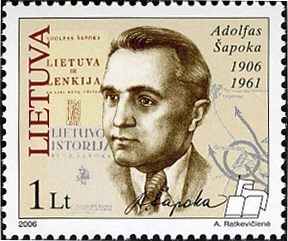
- Šapoka on a Lithuanian postal stamp
- Born: 13 February 1906; Grybeliai, Kovno Governorate, Russian Empire
- Died: 13 February 1961 (aged 55); Toronto, Canada
- Resting place: Park Lawn Cemetery
- Education: Vytautas Magnus University
- Occupations: Historian, writer, publicist
- Spouse: Adelė Stanionytė
- Children: 1
- Relatives: Vida Marija Čigriejienė (niece)
- Writing career
- Subject: Lithuanian medieval history

Adolfas Šapoka (13 February 1906 – 9 March 1961) was a prominent Lithuanian medieval historian. He attended lectures at both Prague University and Stockholm University before becoming a prominent lecturer himself at the Vytautas Magnus and Vilnius universities. Šapoka contributed to the development of the Visuotinė lietuvių enciklopedija as well as medieval historiography in interwar Lithuania. In 1944 he and his family moved to Germany and in 1946 moved again to Canada, where he died. Šapoka's most widely known contribution is "Lietuvos istorija", a study of Lithuania's history from the Baltic Tribes period up to his present-day.

== Biography ==
=== Early life ===
Adolfas Šapoka was born on 13 February 1906 in the village of Grybeliai to Juozapas Šapoka and Konstancija Mikulėnaitė. He attended school in Utena. In 1925 he finished the Panevėžys gymnasium and entered Vytautas Magnus University. He studied with historians Jonas Yčas, Ignas Jonynas, Augustinas Janulaitis, Povilas Gronskis and Lev Karsavin. In 1929 he graduated from the Faculty of Humanitarian Sciences. In 1930 he completed military service and was granted the rank of junior lieutenant.

=== Activity abroad and in Lithuania ===
From 1930 to 1931 Šapoka studied at Charles University in Prague. In 1933 he traveled to Stockholm and attended special courses for foreign historians, as well as collected documents from archives. From 1932 Šapoka was a lecturer at the Vytautas Magnus University. From 1934 he participated in the Lithuanian historical society. In 1936 he and other historians published "Lietuvos istorija" (History of Lithuania). Šapoka also edited a publication on Jogaila, and also published articles in the newspapers Praeitis, Senovė, Vairas, and Židinys. Šapoka's thesis on Lithuania and Poland after the Union of Lublin earned him a doctorate in 1938. His habilitation thesis on the Treaty of Kėdainiai and Swedes in Lithuania in 1655–1656 made Šapoka a docent.

=== Immigration and final years ===
In 1940 the faculty of history was moved to Vilnius. Šapoka was preparing to go there, however he was removed from Vytautas Magnus University by Soviet authorities. From 1940 to 1941 he participated in the editing of the Visuotinė lietuvių enciklopedija and lectured on history in the Kaunas higher technic school. During German occupation from 1941 to 1943 Šapoka was a docent in Vilnius University. In 1944 Šapoka and his family moved to Germany. He lectured on history in a Lithuanian gymnasium and Lithuanian technic school. In 1948 Šapoka immigrated to Canada. From 1941 to 1961 he edited the Catholic newspaper Tėviškės žiburiai. In 1950 Šapoka re-released "Lietuvos istorija" in Germany. He contributed to the making of a Lithuanian encyclopedia in Boston. Šapoka was a council member of the Lithuanian-Canadians Society.

Adolfas Šapoka died on 9 March 1961 in Toronto, Canada. He was buried in Park Lawn Cemetery.

== Historical work and publications ==
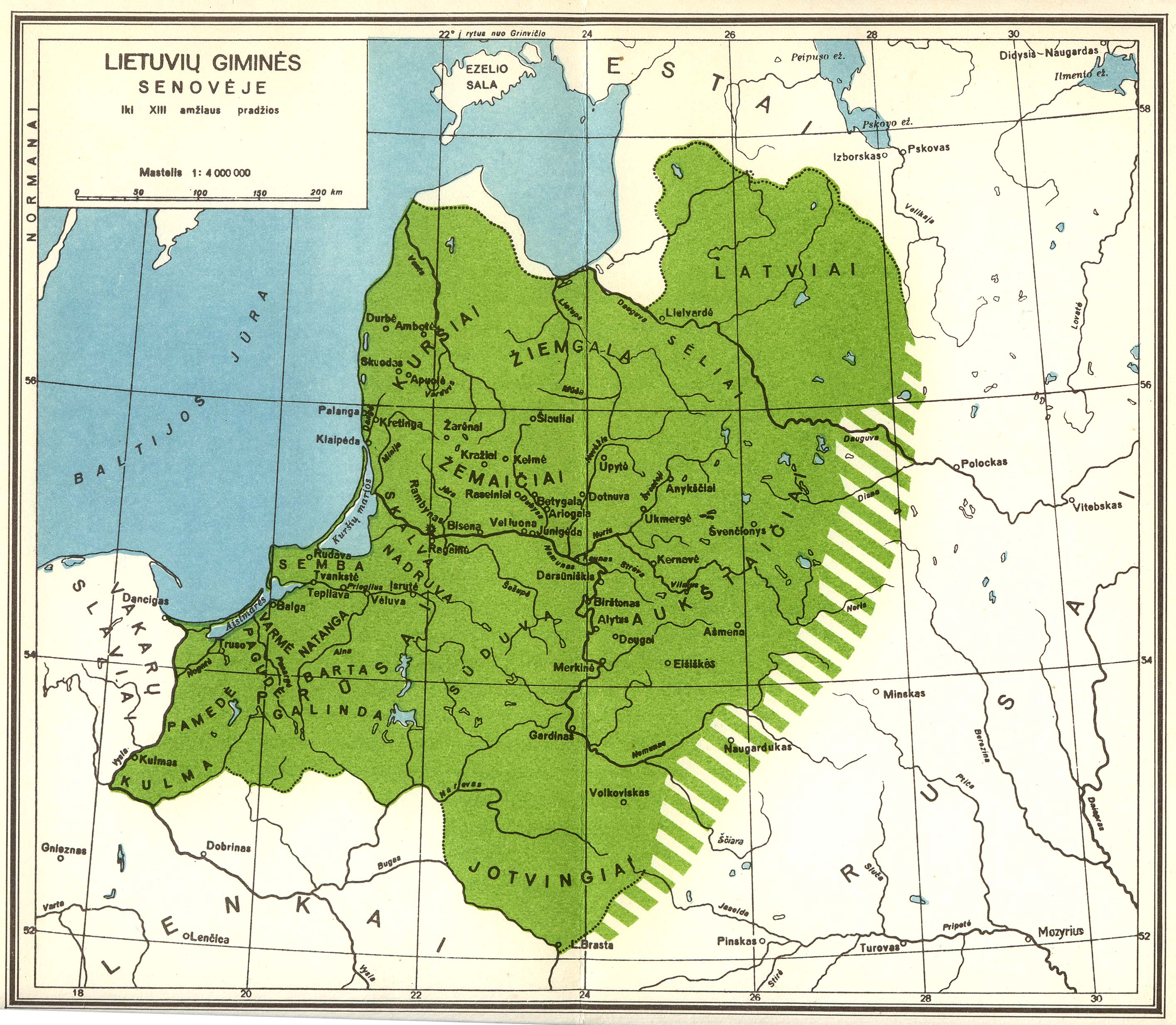
Lithuanian tribes in antiquity until the beginning of the 13th century by Šapoka in 1936

Šapoka was known for logical intellect and analytical thinking. "Lietuvos istorija" was a successful and prominent contemporary publication with record-hitting sales, being used as a study guide for future academics. It garnered much attention from the public, with a record of 17,500 sales. The publication remained an important work for those studying the history of Lithuania for several decades to come. It was re-released in 1989 and sold over 100,000 copies and 155,000 copies in 1990. Šapoka is also known for his publications on Lithuanian medieval history. It was colloquially known as "Šapokos istorija" (Šapokas's History).

== See also ==
- Grand Duchy of Lithuania
- Lithuanian literature
- Lithuanian Canadians
