= Galindians =

Eastern Baltic tribe

The Western Galindians in the context of the other Baltic tribes, circa 1200 CE. The Eastern Balts are shown in brown hues while the Western Balts are shown in green. The boundaries are approximate.

Galindians were two distinct, and now extinct, tribes of the Balts. Most commonly, Galindians refers to the Western Galindians who lived in the southeast part of Prussia. Less commonly, it is used for a tribe that lived in the area of what is today Moscow (Russian: Голядь).

== Etymology ==
Johannes Voigt (supported by many others) suggested that name is derived from the Baltic word *galas ("the end", probably synonymous to "located farthest", "located near the border of the territory or area"), alluding to the fact that they settled for some time further west and further east than any other Baltic tribe.

Polish historian Jerzy Nalepa suggested another etymology: the name Galind- may be derived from the hydronym of Gielądzkie Lake in the province of Olsztyn, in what was the very center of ancient Galindia. J. Nalepa (1971) suggested the root *gal- was originally a different ablaut grade of the same root found in Lithuanian "gilus" – deep, and "gelmė" – depth. The original meaning referred to the depth of the lake mentioned, which is one of the deepest in the area.

The Russian 'golyad' is the result of the common shift of nasal '-en'(ę) into '-ya'(я) in Russian language.

== Galindians ==
Galindians (Old Prussian: *Galindis, (Note: An asterisk placed before the word means that it is reconstructed and is therefore not attested.) Latin: Galindae) – at first a West Baltic tribe, and later an Old Prussian clan – lived in Galindia, roughly the area of present-day Masuria but including territory further south in what would become the Duchy of Masovia. The region lay adjacent to the territory of the Yotvingians, which is today in Podlaskie Voivodeship.

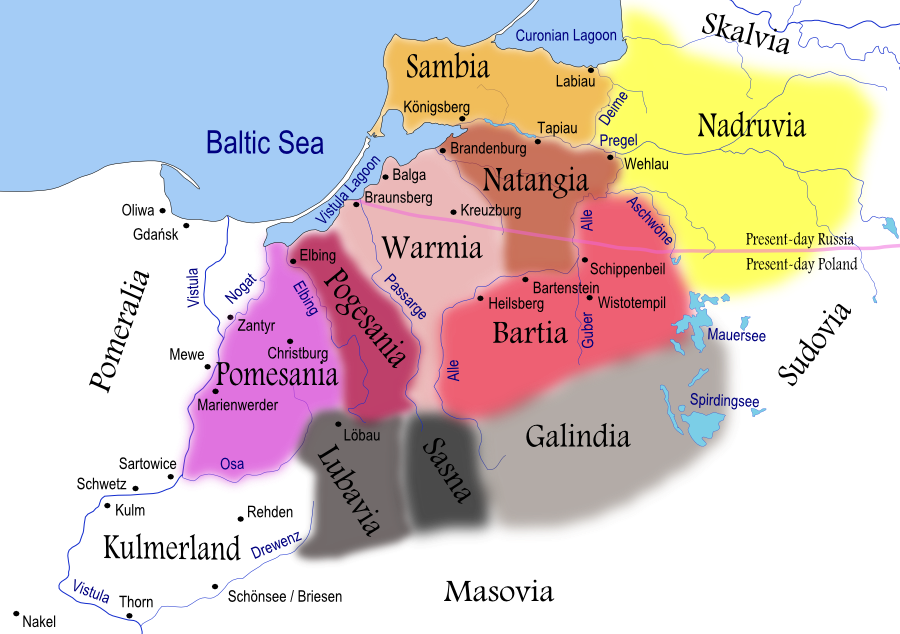
The Prussian tribes in the 13th century (Galindia shown in light grey).

Ptolemy was the first to mention the Galindians (Koine Greek: Galindoi – Γαλίνδοι) in the 2nd century AD. From the 6th/7th century until the 17th century the former central part of the Galindian tribe continued to exist as the Old Prussian clan of *Galindis. The language of the Old Prussians in Galindia became extinct by 17th century, mainly because of the 16th centuries influx of Protestants seeking refuge from Catholic Poland into the Galindian area and German-language administration of Prussia.

== Eastern Galindians ==
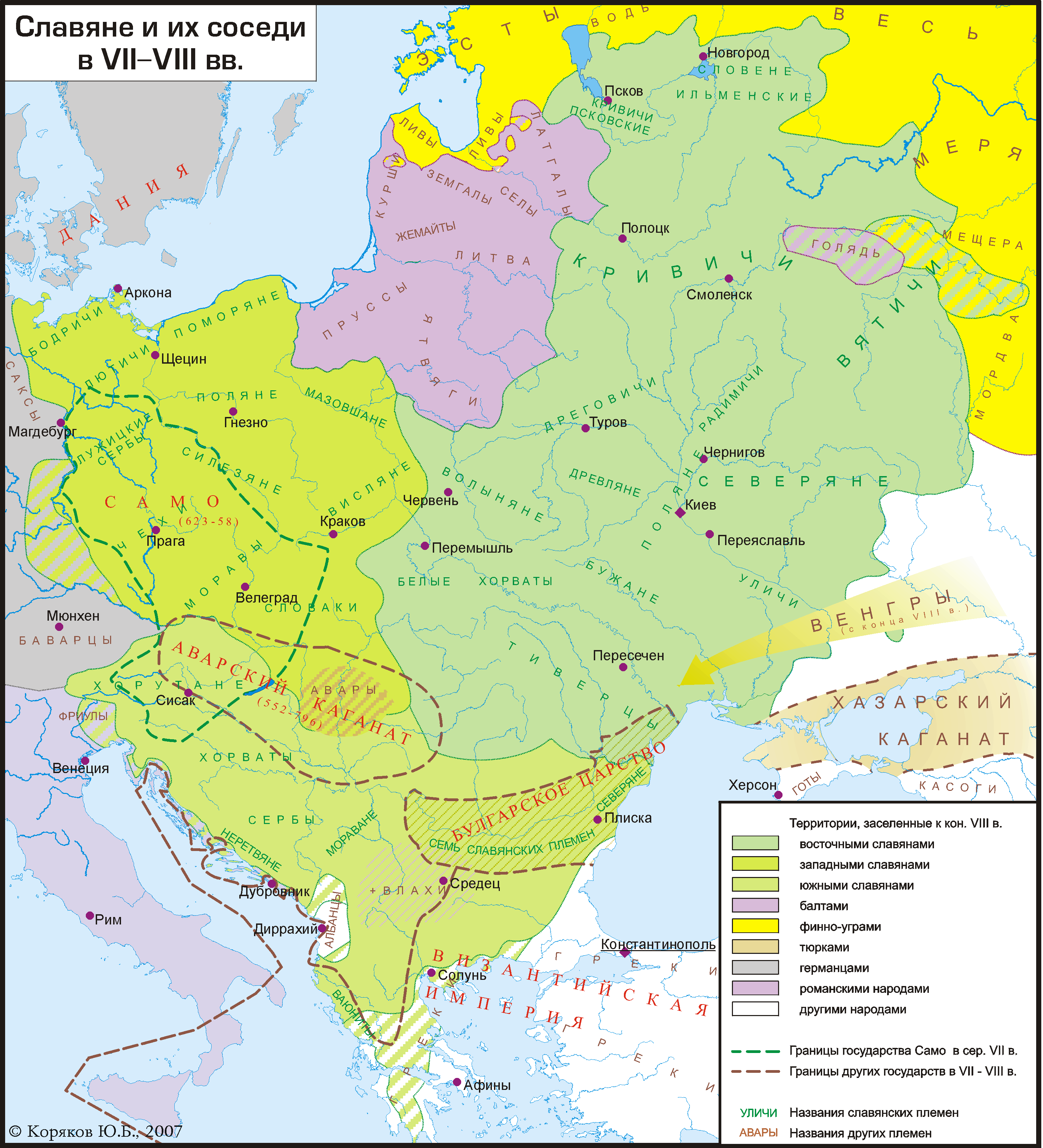
Europe in 7–8th century – Baltic tribes are shown in dark purple. Eastern Galindians can be seen within the Slavic territory.

The Eastern Galindians (East Galindian: *Galindai, Russian: голядь, lit. 'Goliadj', from Old East Slavic голѧдь golędĭ), an extinct East Baltic tribe, lived from the 4th century in the basin of the Protva River, near the modern Russian towns of Mozhaysk, Vereya, and Borovsk. It is probable that the Eastern Galindians, as the bearers of the Moshchiny culture, also occupied all the Kaluga Oblast before the Early East Slavs populated the Moshchiny culture's area at the turn of the 7th and 8th centuries.

The contemporary sources mention Golyad only twice, briefly.

The Golyad are first mentioned in the Laurentian Codex, where it is written that they were conquered by Iziaslav I of Kiev in 1058. This shows that even at the height of the power of the Kievan Rus', were not its subjects or tributaries.

Second, the Hypatian Codex mentions that Sviatoslav Olgovich defeated the Golyad' who lived up the Porotva (now Protva) river in 1147 ("взя люди Голядь, верхъ Поротве").

In addition the Novgorod Fourth Chronicle mentioned that Mikhail Khorobrit "was killed by 'Litva' (Lithuanians) on the Porotva" (Russian: убьенъ бысть от Литвы на Поротве, romanized: ubien byst' ot Litvy na Porotve) in 1248. Historian Valentin Sedov argues that this 'Litva' people were descendants the Galindians, because he sees no reason why would actual Lithuanians make military excursions so far from their lands.

The Russians probably did not completely assimilate them until the 15th (or 16th) century.

There are several toponyms probably related to golyad: two villages named Голяди, a village Голяжье, and the Golyada River, a tributary of the Moskva River.

In folk traditions that lived on into the 20th century there are tales about mighty giants with the (personal) name Golyada. However, this may have been conflated with the Biblical mention about Goliath.

== See also ==
- Dnieper Balts
- Yotvingians
- Neuri

== Sources ==
- Bojtár, Endre (1999). Foreword to the Past: A Cultural History of the Baltic People. Central European University Press. ISBN 9789639116429.
- Tarasov, Ilya (2017). "Балты в миграциях Великого переселения народов" [Balts in the migrations of the Great Migration]. Исторический формат (in Russian). 3–4 (11–12): 95–124.
- Wixman, Ronald (2017). Peoples of the USSR: An Ethnographic Handbook. London and New York: Routledge. ISBN 9780873325066.
- Sedov, V.V. (1982). Восточные славяне в VI-XIII вв [Eastern Slavs in the VI-XIII centuries] (in Russian).
- Sedov, Valentin V. (2000). "Голядь" [Golyad']. In Kazakevičius, Viktoras (ed.). Iš baltų kultūros istorijos. Vilnius: Diemedis. pp. 75–84. Archived from the original on 2011-07-18.
