= Yotvingians =

Historical Baltic people

Approximate territory controlled by the Yotvingians in the 12th century and their tribal subdivisions (modern borders for reference)

Yotvingians, also called Sudovians, Jatvians, or Jatvingians, (Note: Yotvingian: Jotvingai; Lithuanian: Jotvingiai, Sūduviai; Ukrainian: Ятвяги; Latvian: Jātvingi; Polish: Jaćwingowie, Belarusian: Яцвягі, German: Sudauer.) were a Western Baltic people who were closely tied to the Old Prussians. The linguist Petras Būtėnas once asserted that they were closest to the Lithuanians. The Yotvingians contributed to the formation of the Lithuanian state.

== Culture ==
=== Etymology ===
According to Vytautas Mažiulis, the name Sūduva derives from a local hydronym *Sūd(a)vā, derived from a Baltic verbal root, *sū-: to flow, pour.

=== Language ===
Numerous linguists consider the Yotvingian language as a dialect of the Old Prussian language. The Lithuanian linguist Petras Būtėnas states that such an opinion is incorrect, because the Lithuanian kalnas predominates in Yotvingian toponymy instead of the Old Prussian garbis. The Lithuanian professor Zigmas Zinkevičius wrote that the Yotvingians spoke a dialect of Western Baltic that was closer to Lithuanian than Prussian. The only known written source of the Yotvingian language is the manuscript "Pagan Dialects from Narew".

== Geography ==
A map showing the territory of the already partially assimilated Yotvingians in the 11th century

The Yotvingians lived in the area of Sudovia (Yotvingia) and Dainava, southwest from the upper Nemunas river. Today, this area corresponds mostly to the Podlaskie Voivodeship in Poland, portions of Lithuania west of the Nemunas and a part of Hrodna Province in Belarus. The territory was between the later cities of Marijampolė and Merkinė (Lithuania), Slonim and Kobryn (Belarus), and Białystok and Lyck in Prussia (now Ełk, Poland).

Before the 10th century, in the south, Yotvingian homesteads reached the Brest area. In the west, they reached the Narew river basin. In the north, they reached the Vilnius' and Kaunas' southern outskirts. The territory was shrinking over time.

Kurgans of Sudovian culture predate Yotvingian presence

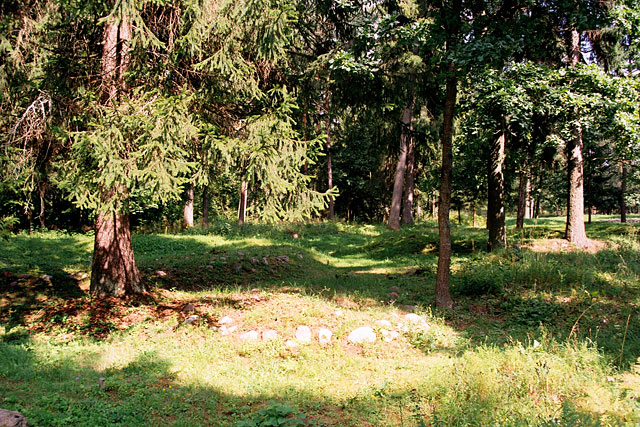
A kurgan in the area of Suwałki

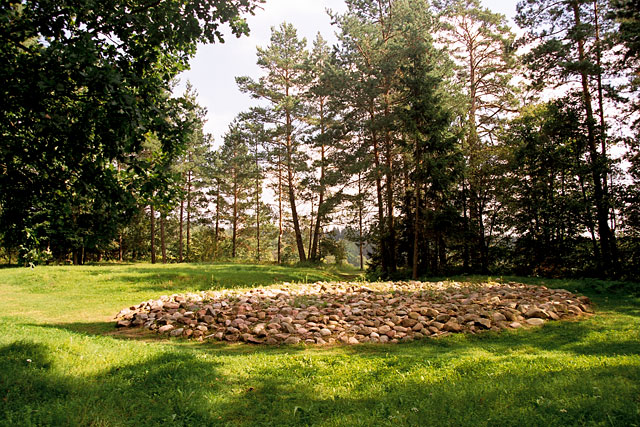
A kurgan in the area of Suwałki

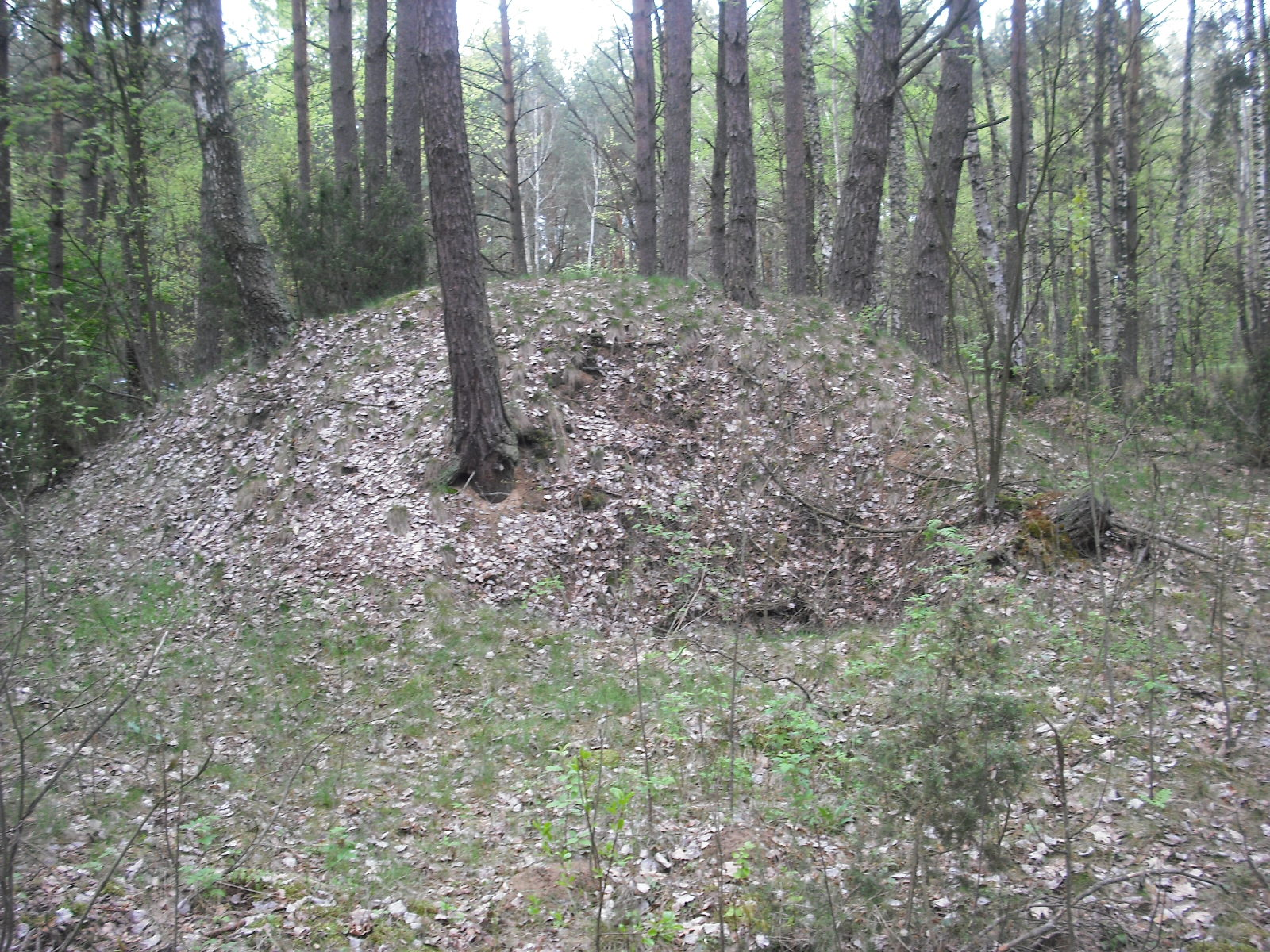
A kurgan in the area of Jatwieź Duża

== History ==
=== Ancient history ===
According to The Histories of Herodotus (5th century B.C.), the Neuri (Νευροί) were a tribe living beyond the Scythian cultivators, one of the nations along the course of the river Hypanis (Bug river), west of the Borysthenes (Dniepr river). This was roughly the area of modern Belarus and Eastern Poland by the Narew river, coinciding with the Yotvingian linguistic territory of toponyms and hydronyms (Narew river) and the Scythian tribe of the Aroteres to the south-east.

Ptolemy in the 2nd century AD called the people Galindai kai Soudinoi (Σουδινοί). Peter of Dusburg called them Galindite and Suduwite. In the Hypatian Codex the spelling changes: Jatviagy, Jatviezie, Jatviažin, zemlia Jatveskaja, na zemliu Jatviažs´kuju and more. Polish sources also used Russian spellings: Jazviagi, Iazvizite, Jazvizite, Yazvizite.

This name was taken by the papal administration: terra Jatwesouie, Gretuesia, Gzestuesie, Getuesia und Getvesia. The Knights called this tribe Sudowite, Sudowia, in qua Sudowit. and the Scythian tribe of the Aroteres to the south-east.

=== 10th century ===
In 944, during the treaty between the Kievan Rus' prince Igor and the emperor of the Byzantine Empire, the Yotvingians were hired by the Kievan ruler to serve as mercenaries. In 983, Vladimir I of Kiev hired the Yotvingians to add to his army.

=== 13th century ===
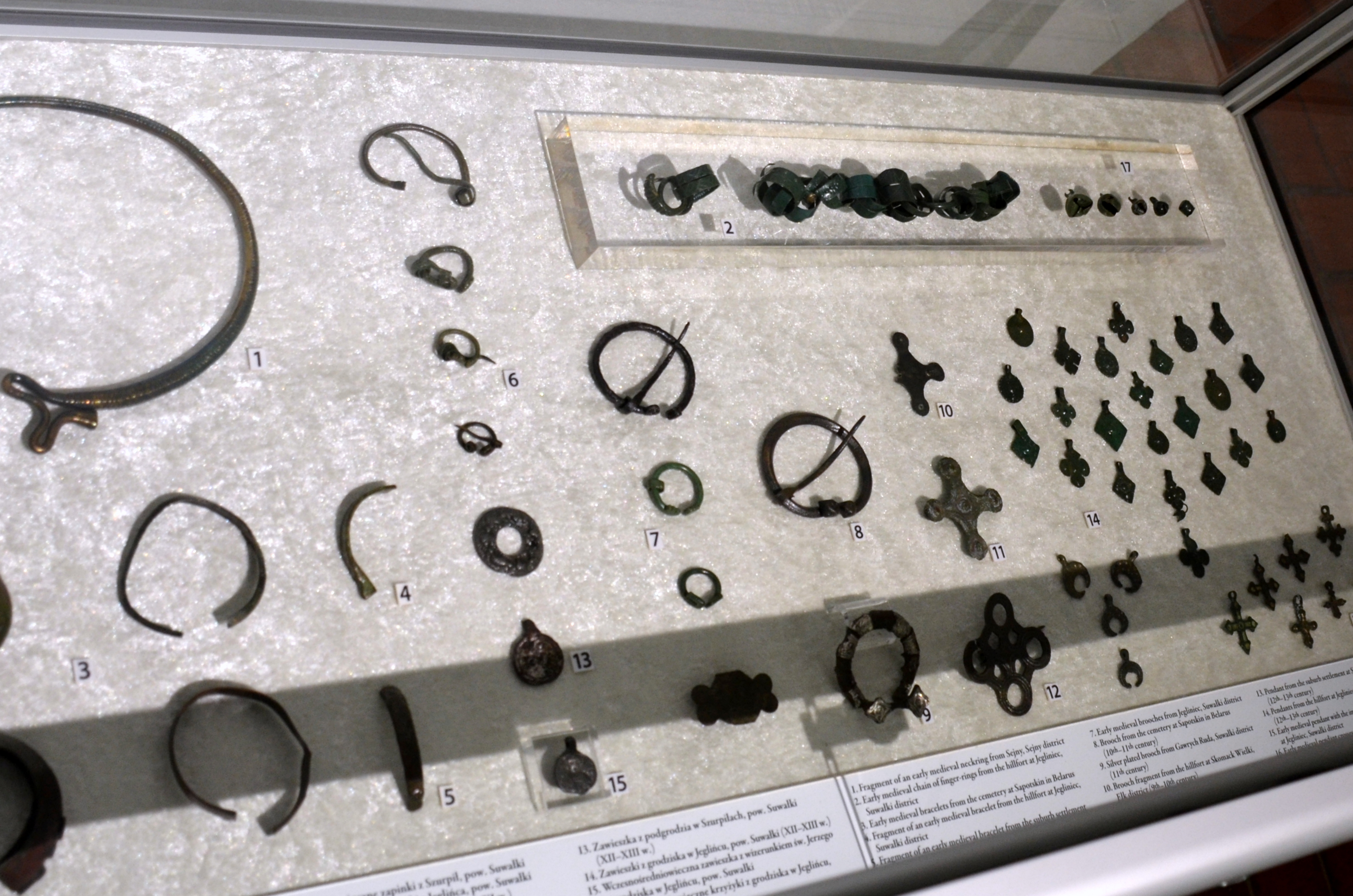
12th and 13th-century Yotvingian jewellery found in the Suwalki region

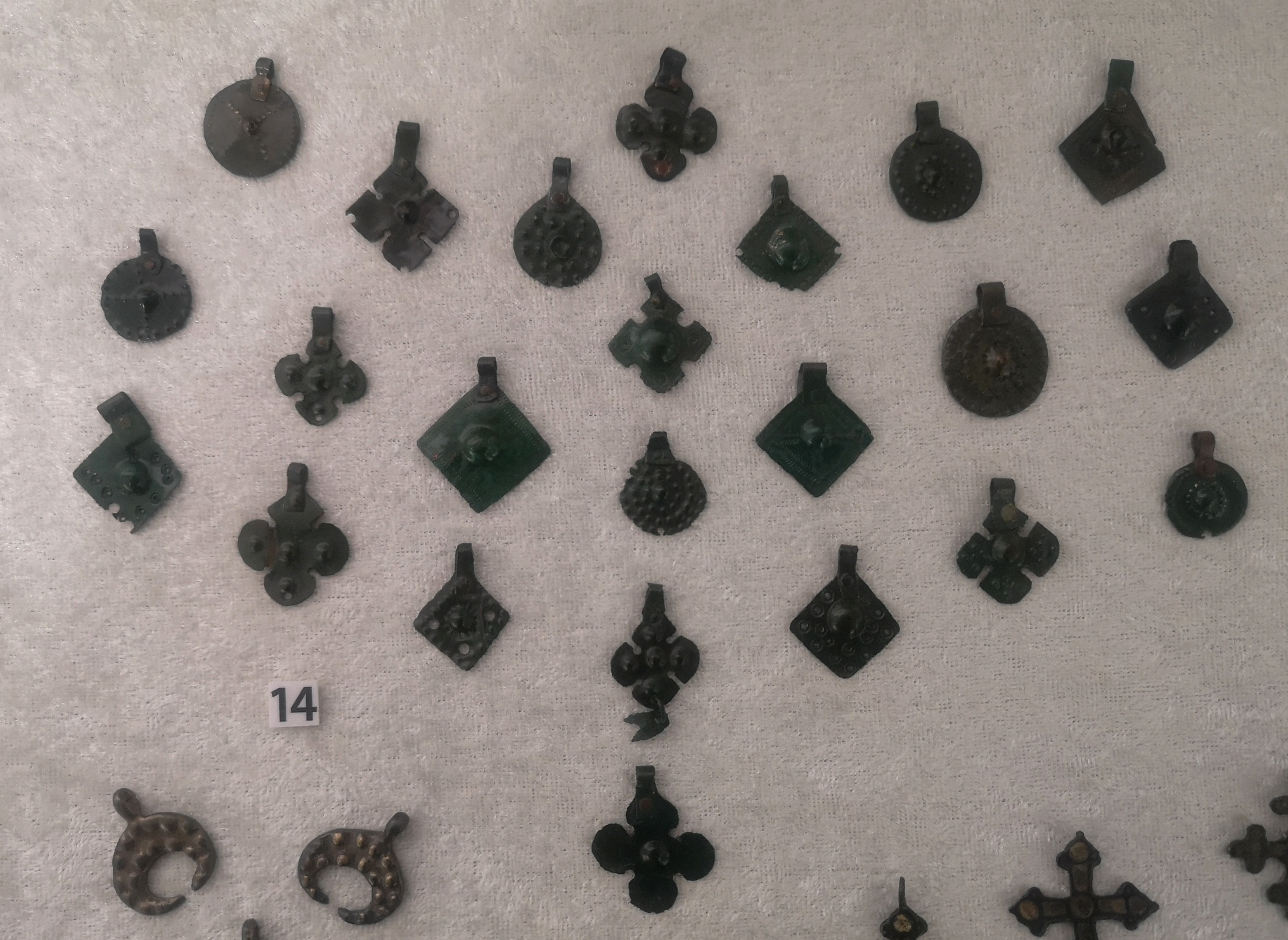
12th and 13th-century Yotvingian bronze pendants found in Jegliniec

In two dotations, in 1253 and 1259, by King Mindaugas of Lithuania, a new name was recorded: Dainava, Deynowe, Dainowe, Denowe (land of songs). The forests were named Deinova Jatvež. In the 1260 treaty with the Teutonic Knights, the region is called "terre Getuizintarum". Skalmantas, leader of the Yotvingians was responsible for single-handedly raiding Pinsk in the Principality of Turov.

=== 14th century ===
In the sentence of Breslau of the emperor Sigismund of Luxembourg to the Livonian Order from 1325, this area is called Suderlandt alias Jetuen.

=== 15th century ===
Vytautas the Great wrote about "terra Sudorum", in a letter to King Sigismund of March 11, 1420.

A 1860 census by the clergy of the Belarus Grodno area, had 30,929 inhabitants identifying as Yatviags. In Peter von Koppen's work, the Polessie region also contained Yatviag identifying individuals: 22,725 in Kobryn district, 1,616 in Brest district.

=== 20th century ===
Map of the Yotvingian Ethnolinguistic area defined on the Western Polissia scholarly conference In April 1990.

In the 1980s, a group of intellectuals led by Nikolai Shelyagovich emerged, which created the public-cultural association "Polesie" (Полісьсе) in April 1988. Its goals were the revival of the Western Polesie language, recognition of the local residents of as a national minority and a national and cultural autonomy of Western Polesie. The group claimed that the residents of West Polesia were Yotvingians.

In April 1990, the group held a scholarly conference in Minsk, declaring that the territories of the Brest and Pinsk regions of Belarus, the Volhynia region of Ukraine, and the Podlachia and Chełm regions of Poland were a part of the Yotvingian ethnic group.

== Notable Yotvingians ==
- Komantas of Sudovia led the Yotvingians in the Prussian uprisings.

== See also ==
- Sudovian language
- Yotvingia
- Polesie association

== Literature ==
- Totoraitis, Jonas (2003) [1938]. Sūduvos Suvalkijos istorija (in Lithuanian). Marijampolė: Piko valanda. ISBN 978-9986-875-87-1.
- Witczak, K. T., Traces of Dual Forms in Old Prussian and Jatvingian in Woljciech Smoczynski and Axel Holvoet, eds, Colloquium Pruthenicum primum, 1992, pp 93–98
- Gerullis, G., Zur Sprache der Sudauer-Jadwinger, in Festschrift A. Bezzenberger, Göttingen 1927
- Toporov, V., ИНДОЕВРОПЕЙСКЕ ЯЗЫКИ [Indo-European languages] Лингвистический энциклопеический словарь.[Linguistic encyclopedic dictionary] Moskva, 1990, pp 186–189
- Mažiulis, V., Baltic languages. Britannica Online Encyclopedia
- Henning, E., De rebus Jazygum sive Jazuin-gorum, Regiomonti, 1812
- Sjoegren, A., Ueber die Wohnsitz Verhaeltnisse und der Jatwaeger, St. Petersburg, 1859
- Sembrzycki, J., Die Nord-und Westgebiete the Jadwinger und deren Grenzen, Altpreussischeme Monatschrift, XXVIII, 1891, pp. 76–89
- W. R. Schmalstieg, Studies in Old Prussian, University Park and London, 1976.
- V. Toporov, Prusskij jazyk: Slovar', A - L, Moskva, 1975–1990.
- V. Mažiulis, Prūsų kalbos etimologijos žodynas, Vilnius, t. I-IV, 1988–1997.
- Archäologie der UDSSR: Die Finno-Ugrier und die Balten im Mittelalter, Teil II, Balten, S. 411–419, Moskau 1987
- Lepa, Gerhard (Hrsg): Die Sudauer, in Tolkemita-Texte Nr. 55, Dieburg 1998
- Lepa, Gerhard: Gedanken über die Prußen und ihre Lieder, in Tolkemita-Texte "25 Lieder der Sudauer" Nr. 56, Dieburg 1999
- Litauische Enzyklopädie, Bd. XXVX, Boston, USA, 1963
- Salemke, Gerhard: Lagepläne der Wallburganlagen von der ehemaligen Provinz Ostpreußen, Gütersloh, 2005, Karten 19/ 7 - 19/ 13
- Žilevičius, Juozas: Grundzüge der kleinlitauischen Volksmusik, in Tolkemita-Texte "25 Lieder der Sudauer" Nr. 56, Dieburg 1999

== Sources ==
- Būtėnas, Petras (December 1957). "Sudūviai - Jotvingiai - Dainuviai" (PDF). Karys (in Lithuanian). 10 (1337): 314–316.
- Budreckis, Algirdas (1967). "Etnografinės Lietuvos rytinės ir pietinės sienos". Karys (in Lithuanian).
- Gimbutas, Marija (1963). The Balts. Ancient peoples and places. Vol. 33. London: Thames and Hudson. pp. 97–102.
- Mažiulis, Vytautas (1993). Prūsų kalbos etimologijos žodynas [Etymological Dictionary of the Prussian Language] (in Lithuanian). Vol. II. Vilnius: Mokslas. pp. 7–12. ISBN 978-5-420-00791-4.
- Mažiulis, Vytautas (1997). Prūsų kalbos etimologijos žodynas [Etymological Dictionary of the Prussian Language] (in Lithuanian). Vol. IV. Vilnius. pp. 166–167. ISBN 978-5-420-01406-6.
- Sabaliauskas, Algirdas (1995). Mes Baltai [We, the Balts] (in Lithuanian). Vilnius, Lithuania: Science and Encyclopedia Publishers. p. 80.
- Antoniewicz, Jerzy (1958). "The mysterious Sudovian people". Archaeology. II (3): 158–161.
- Antoniewicz, Jerzy (1962). The Sudovians. Białystok.
- DUSBURG (PETRI DE DUSBURG), Chronicon Prussiae, ed. Chr. Hartknock, Jena, 1879
- Kapočius, Juozas (1970–1978). "Skomantas". In Sužiedėlis, Simas (ed.). Encyclopedia Lituanica. Boston, Massachusetts. LCCN 74-114275.
- Sužiedėlis, Saulius A. (2011). Historical Dictionary of Lithuania. Scarecrow Press. ISBN 9780810875364.
- Zinkevičius, Zigmas (1996). The History of the Lithuanian Language. Mokslo ir enciklopedijų leidykla. ISBN 9785420013632.
- Sulimirski, T. (1985). "The Scyths". In Gershevitch, I. (ed.). The Median and Achaemenian Periods. The Cambridge History of Iran. Vol. 2. Cambridge, United Kingdom: Cambridge University Press. pp. 149–199. ISBN 978-1-139-05493-5.
- Sulimirski, Tadeusz; Taylor, T. F. (1991). "The Scythians". In Boardman, John; Edwards, I. E. S.; Hammond, N. G. L.; Sollberger, E.; Walker, C. B. F. (eds.). The Assyrian and Babylonian Empires and other States of the Near East, from the Eighth to the Sixth Centuries B.C. The Cambridge Ancient History. Vol. 3. Cambridge, United Kingdom: Cambridge University Press. pp. 547–590. ISBN 978-1-139-05429-4.
