= Marianna Popiełuszko =

Polish farmer (1920–2013)

- Born: Marianna Gniedziejko; 7 November 1920; Grodzisk, Poland
- Died: 19 November 2013 (aged 93); Białystok, Poland
- Occupation: Farmer
- Known for: Mother of Jerzy Popiełuszko
- Spouse: Władysław Popiełuszko
- Children: Teresa, Józef, Alfons (Jerzy), Jadwiga, Stanisław
- Parent(s): Kazimierz and Marianna Gniedziejko

Marianna Popiełuszko (born Marianna Gniedziejko 7 November 1920 – 19 November 2013) (Note: Marianna Popiełuszko's date of birth is given as 1 June 1910 in some documents, but was an error that it was probably made during the German occupation in Poland or shortly after it. However, it was confirmed that Marianna was born on 7 November 1920 according to the baptismal records of parish in Suchowola.) was a Polish farmer and the mother of Father Jerzy Popiełuszko, who was brutally attacked and murdered by three Security Service agents in 1984.

== Biography ==
Marianna was born in Grodzisk on 7 November 1920 to her mother, Marianna Gniedziejko (née Kalinowska) and her father, Kazimierz. According to PESEL (Powszechny Elektroniczny System Ewidencji Ludności; Universal Electronic System for Registration of the Population), she was born on 1 June 1910, but the date was erroneously recorded. Marianna lived in Grodzisk and was a farmer in Okopy. In 1942, she married Władysław, and they had five children named Teresa, Józef, Alfons (whom he changed his named to Jerzy while studying at the seminary), Jadwiga, and Stanisław. In addition to having five children, Marianna attended masses celebrated by her son Jerzy, who was the chaplain of Solidarity movement in Warsaw.

Marianna attended various religious and anniversary events that include the meeting with Solidarity activists and the pilgrimage to Jasna Góra Monastery in the wake of her son Jerzy's murder; then she set up a room dedicated to Jerzy in her home where she kept memorabilia about him.

On 19 November 2013, Marianna died at the public hospital in Białystok. Four days later, she was buried along with her family at the cemetery in Suchowola.

Marianna received the Order of Polonia Resituta, awarded by President Lech Kaczyński, for her contributions to the democratic transition in Poland and her social and professional achievements in 2006, and became an honorary citizen of the Kuyavian-Pomeranian Province in 2013. In 1990, Marianna received the St. Rita Award granted by Augustinian sisters community in Cascia to women, like Rita of Cascia, who has shown forgiveness in their lives.

Mileny Kindziuk's book Matka świętego (The Saint's Mother) discusses Maria's family life, as she testifies as a mother especially of Jerzy.

== Gallery ==
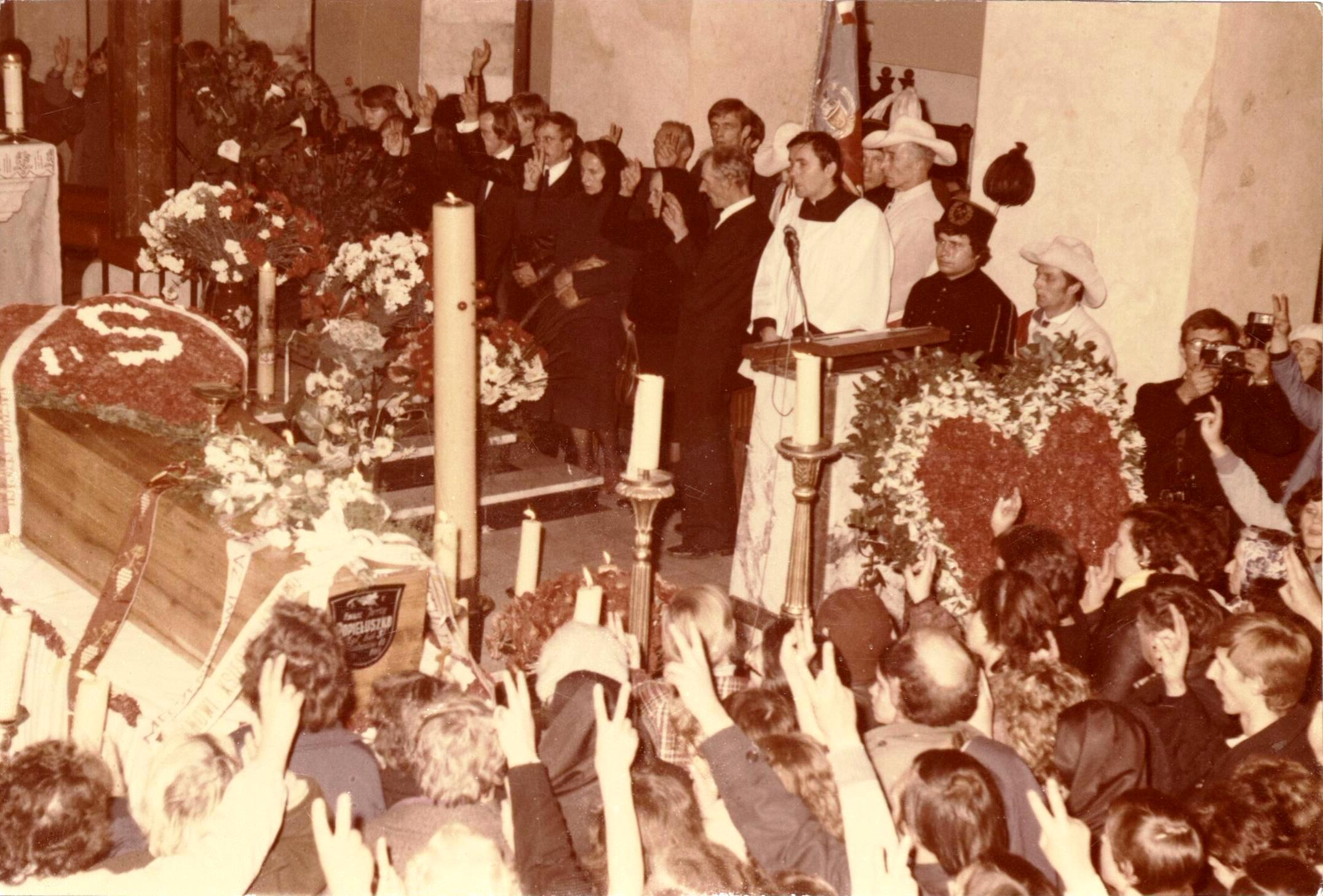
Marianna Popiełuszko (next to the priest) attending her son Jerzy's funeral with her husband, Władysław (1984)

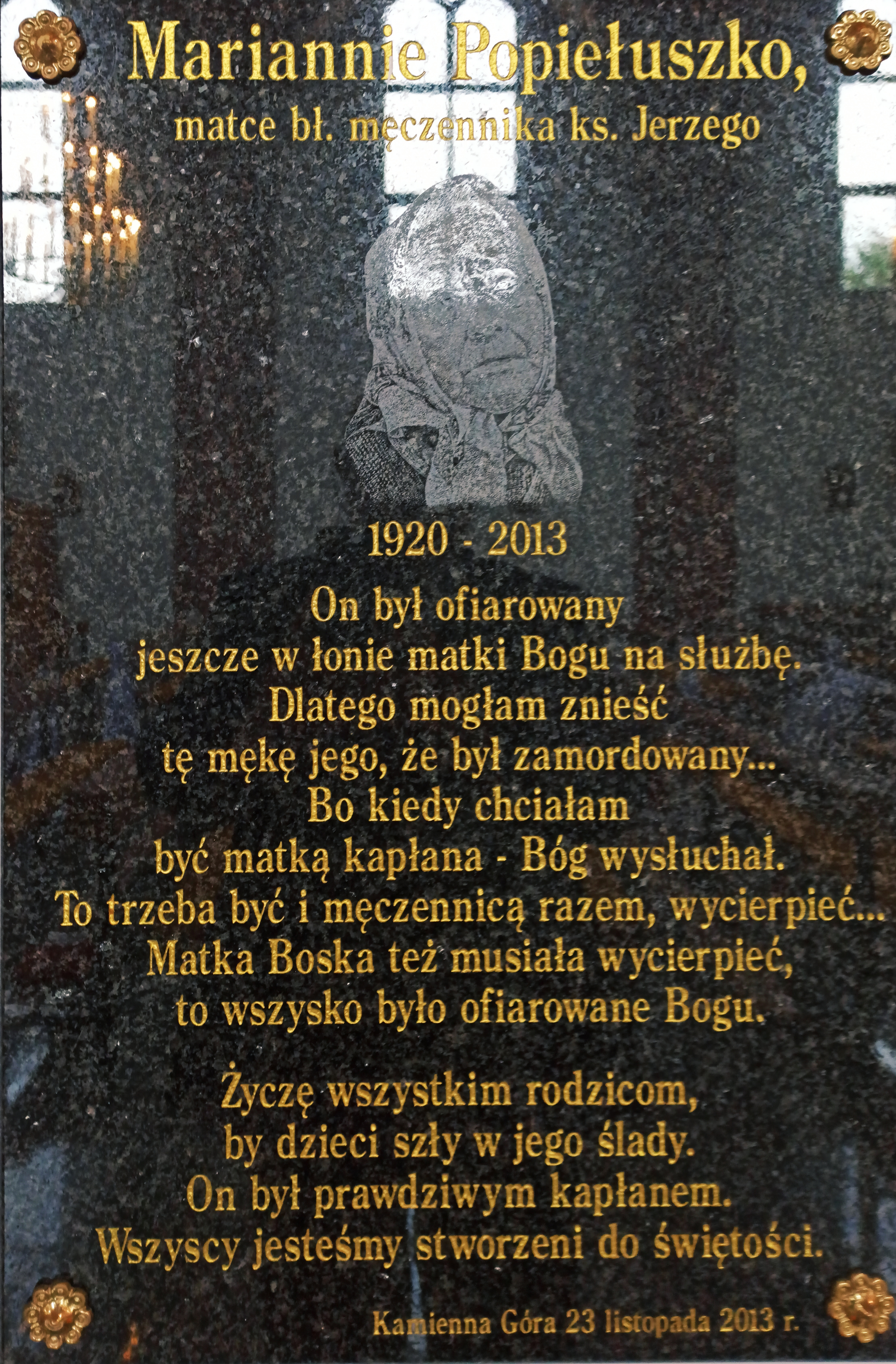
Marianna's memorial plaque in the Church of the Sacred Heart of Jesus at Kamienna Góra.
