= Leszczany =

Leszczany may refer to the following places:

- Leszczany, Lublin Voivodeship (east Poland)
- Leszczany, Gmina Krynki in Podlaskie Voivodeship (north-east Poland)
- Leszczany, Gmina Suchowola in Podlaskie Voivodeship (north-east Poland)
