= Sucha Góra =

Sucha Góra may refer to:

- Sucha Góra, Bytom, a district of Bytom, Poland
- Sucha Góra, Podlaskie Voivodeship, a village in Sokółka County, Podlaskie Voivodeship, Poland
- Sucha Góra (hill), a mountain in Podkarpackie Voivodeship, Poland
  - Sucha Góra TV Tower, on the hill
- Suchá Hora or Sucha Góra, a village in Slovakia on the Polish border
