= Ostrówek, Gmina Suchowola =

Ostrówek
- Village
- Location within Poland
- Coordinates: 53°37′37″N 23°07′01″E
- Country: Poland
- Voivodeship: Podlaskie
- County: Sokółka
- Gmina: Suchowola

Ostrówek [ɔsˈtruvɛk] is a village in the administrative district of Gmina Suchowola, within Sokółka County, Podlaskie Voivodeship, in north-eastern Poland.
