= Bachmackie Kolonie =

- Village
- Location within Poland
- Coordinates: 53°34′46″N 23°15′53″E
- Country: Poland
- Voivodeship: Podlaskie
- County: Sokółka
- Gmina: Suchowola

Bachmackie Kolonie [baxˈmat͡skʲɛ kɔˈlɔɲɛ] is a village in the administrative district of Gmina Suchowola, within Sokółka County, Podlaskie Voivodeship, in north-eastern Poland.
