= Tablewo =

- Village
- Location within Poland
- Coordinates: 53°31′08″N 23°12′50″E
- Country: Poland
- Voivodeship: Podlaskie
- County: Sokółka
- Gmina: Suchowola

Tablewo [taˈblɛvɔ] is a village in the administrative district of Gmina Suchowola, within Sokółka County, Podlaskie Voivodeship, in north-eastern Poland.
