= Krzywa, Sokółka County =

Krzywa
- Village
- Location within Poland
- Coordinates: 53°33′4″N 23°5′59″E
- Country: Poland
- Voivodeship: Podlaskie
- County: Sokółka
- Gmina: Suchowola
- Website: http://www.andreas786.friko.pl/krzywa.html

Krzywa [ˈkʂɨva] is a village in the administrative district of Gmina Suchowola, within Sokółka County, Podlaskie Voivodeship, in north-eastern Poland.
