= Ciemne, Podlaskie Voivodeship =

Ciemne
- Village
- Location within Poland
- Coordinates: 53°38′50″N 23°05′02″E
- Country: Poland
- Voivodeship: Podlaskie
- County: Sokółka
- Gmina: Suchowola

Ciemne ([ˈt͡ɕɛmnɛ]; Lithuanian: Ciemnė) is a village in the administrative district of Gmina Suchowola, within Sokółka County, Podlaskie Voivodeship, in north-eastern Poland.
