= Połomin-Kolonia =

- Village
- Location within Poland
- Coordinates: 53°32′28″N 23°16′12″E
- Country: Poland
- Voivodeship: Podlaskie
- County: Sokółka
- Gmina: Suchowola

Połomin-Kolonia [pɔˈwɔmʲin kɔˈlɔɲa] is a village in the administrative district of Gmina Suchowola, within Sokółka County, Podlaskie Voivodeship, in north-eastern Poland.
