= Domuraty =

- Village
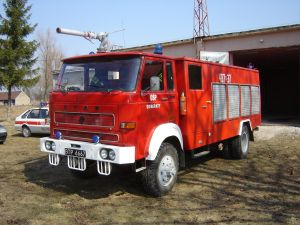
- Fire engine in Domuraty

- Location within Poland
- Coordinates: 53°39′56″N 23°08′14″E
- Country: Poland
- Voivodeship: Podlaskie
- County: Sokółka
- Gmina: Suchowola
- Time zone: UTC+1 (CET)
  - Summer (DST): UTC+2 (CEST)
- Vehicle registration: BSK

Domuraty [dɔmuˈratɨ] is a village in the administrative district of Gmina Suchowola, within Sokółka County, Podlaskie Voivodeship, in north-eastern Poland.

== History ==
Following the Partitions of Poland, the village fell to the Russian Partition of Poland. During the January Uprising, on April 4, 1863, the Cossacks committed a massacre of five captive Polish insurgents despite the disapproval of Russian officers. The insurgents were buried in nearby Chodorówka Nowa. After World War I, Poland regained independence and control of the village.

== Sights ==
There is a memorial to the victims of the massacre of 1863 in Domuraty.
