= Czerwonka, Sokółka County =

Czerwonka
- Village
- Location within Poland
- Coordinates: 53°35′N 23°13′E
- Country: Poland
- Voivodeship: Podlaskie
- County: Sokółka
- Gmina: Suchowola
- Time zone: UTC+1 (CET)
  - Summer (DST): UTC+2 (CEST)
- Postal code: 16-150
- Vehicle registration: BSK

Czerwonka [t͡ʂɛrˈvɔnka] is a village in the administrative district of Gmina Suchowola, within Sokółka County, Podlaskie Voivodeship, in north-eastern Poland.

== History ==
According to the 1921 census, the village had a population of 462, entirely Polish by nationality and Roman Catholic by confession.

Three Polish citizens were murdered by Nazi Germany in the village during World War II.
