= Horodnianka, Sokółka County =

Horodnianka
- Village
- Location within Poland
- Coordinates: 53°39′N 23°6′E
- Country: Poland
- Voivodeship: Podlaskie
- County: Sokółka
- Gmina: Suchowola

Horodnianka [xɔrɔdˈɲanka] is a village in the administrative district of Gmina Suchowola, within Sokółka County, Podlaskie Voivodeship, in north-eastern Poland.
