= Dryga =

- Village
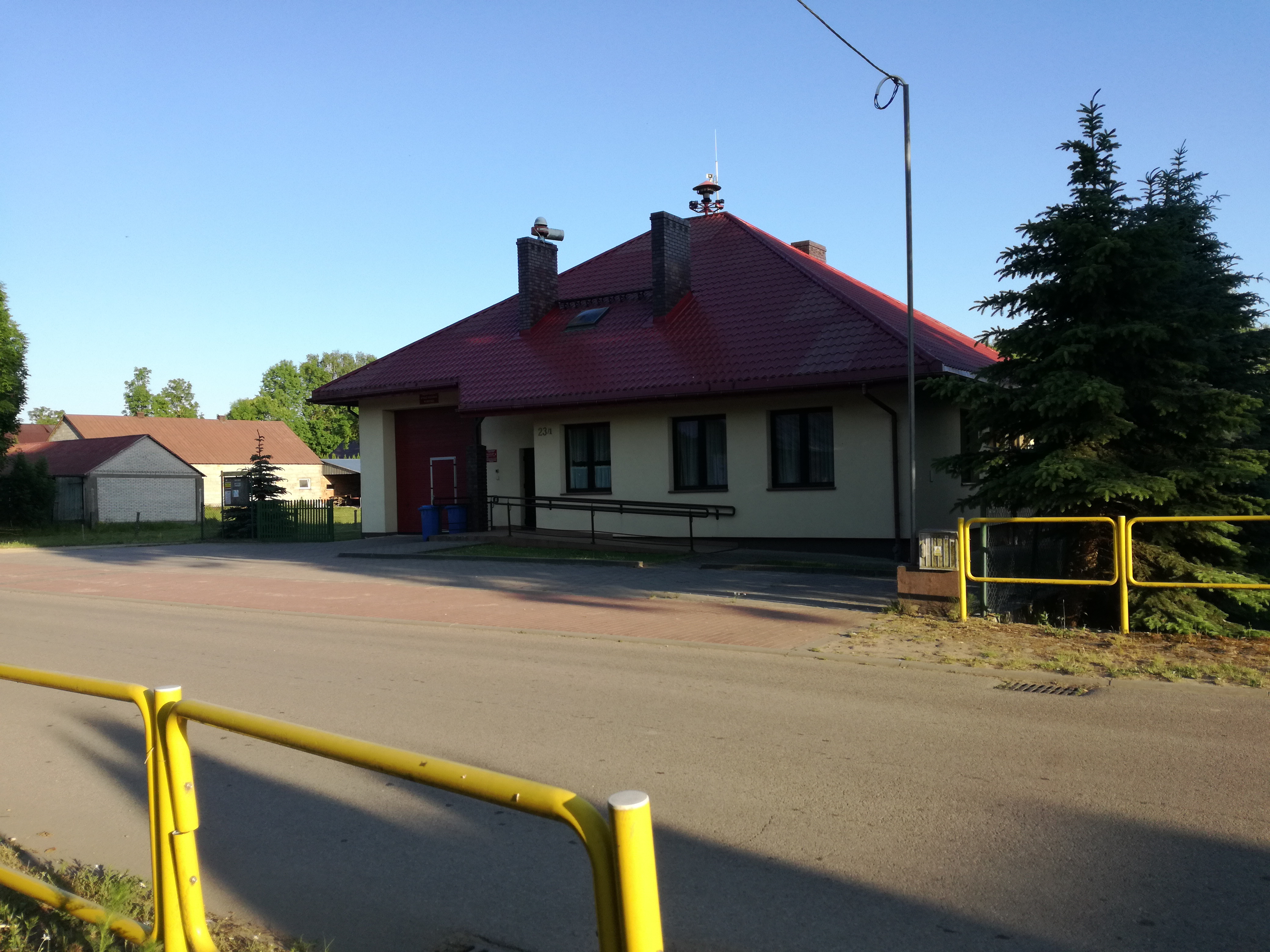

- Location within Poland
- Coordinates: 53°32′N 23°8′E
- Country: Poland
- Voivodeship: Podlaskie
- County: Sokółka
- Gmina: Suchowola

Dryga [ˈdrɨɡa] is a village in the administrative district of Gmina Suchowola, within Sokółka County, Podlaskie Voivodeship, in north-eastern Poland.
