= Chodorówka Stara =

- Village
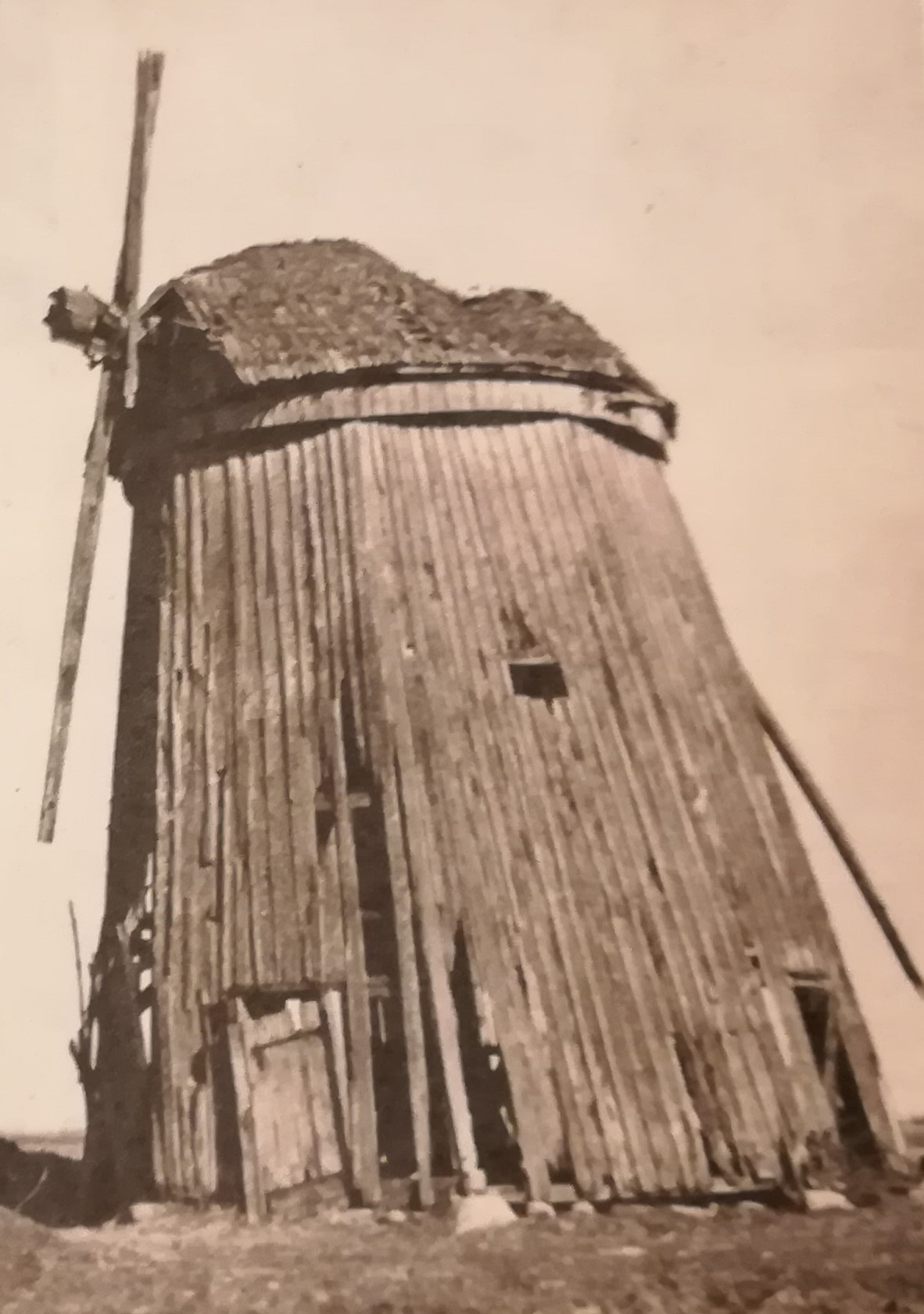
- Windmill in Chodorówka Stara. It was demolished before 1981.

- Coat of arms

- Location within Poland
- Coordinates: 53°31′54″N 23°07′48″E
- Country: Poland
- Voivodeship: Podlaskie
- County: Sokółka
- Gmina: Suchowola

Chodorówka Stara [xɔdɔˈrufka ˈstara] is a village in the administrative district of Gmina Suchowola, within Sokółka County, Podlaskie Voivodeship, in north-eastern Poland.
