= Chlewisk Górny =

- Village
- Location within Poland
- Coordinates: 53°34′20″N 23°10′19″E
- Country: Poland
- Voivodeship: Podlaskie
- County: Sokółka
- Gmina: Suchowola

Chlewisk Górny [ˈxlɛvʲisk ˈɡurnɨ] is a village in the administrative district of Gmina Suchowola, within Sokółka County, Podlaskie Voivodeship, in north-eastern Poland.
