= Poświętne, Sokółka County =

Poświętne
- Village
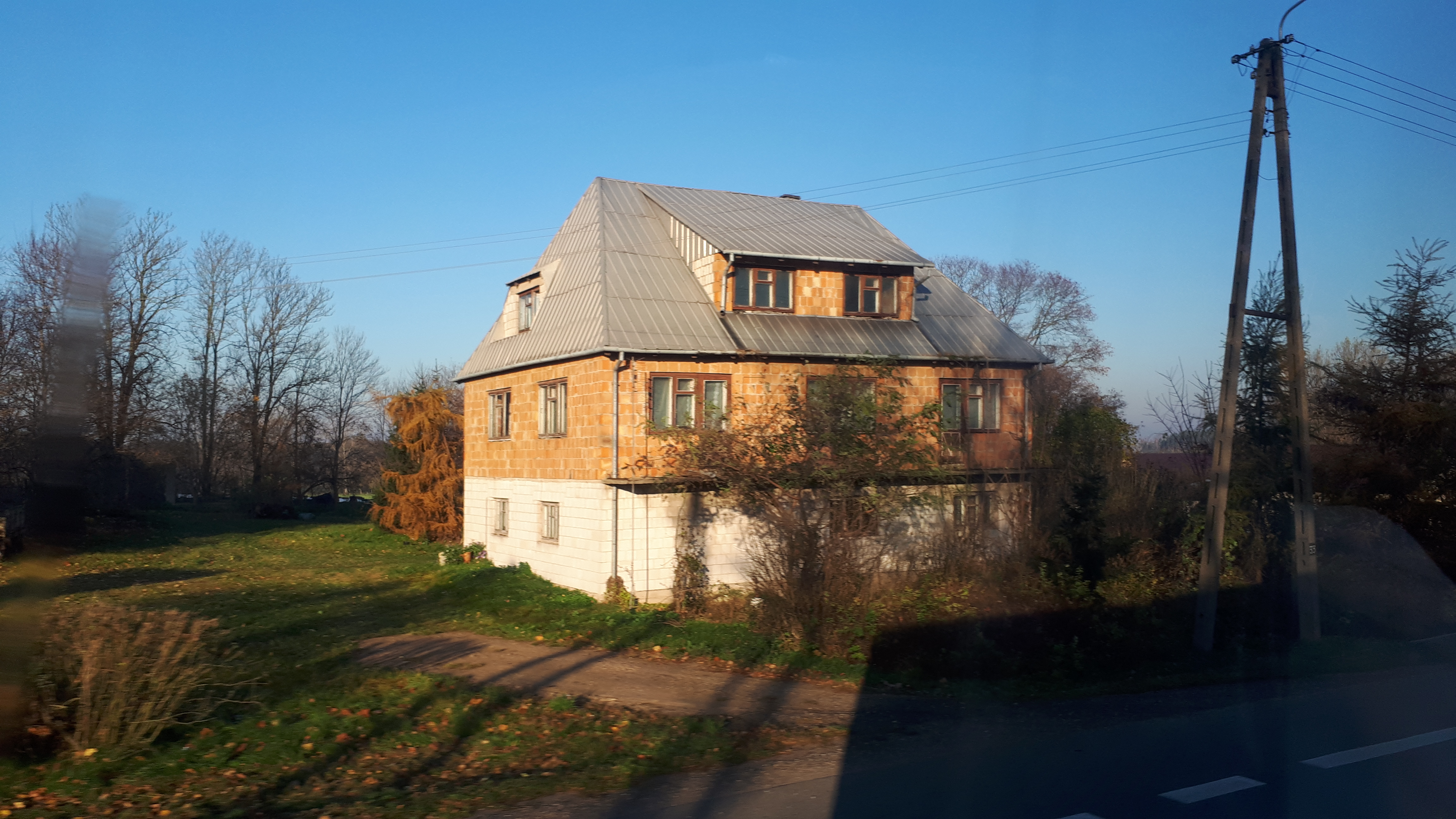

- Location within Poland
- Coordinates: 53°32′49″N 23°5′55″E
- Country: Poland
- Voivodeship: Podlaskie
- County: Sokółka
- Gmina: Suchowola
- Population: 40

Poświętne [pɔɕˈfjɛntnɛ] is a village in the administrative district of Gmina Suchowola, within Sokółka County, Podlaskie Voivodeship, in north-eastern Poland.
