= Jatwieź Mała =

- Village
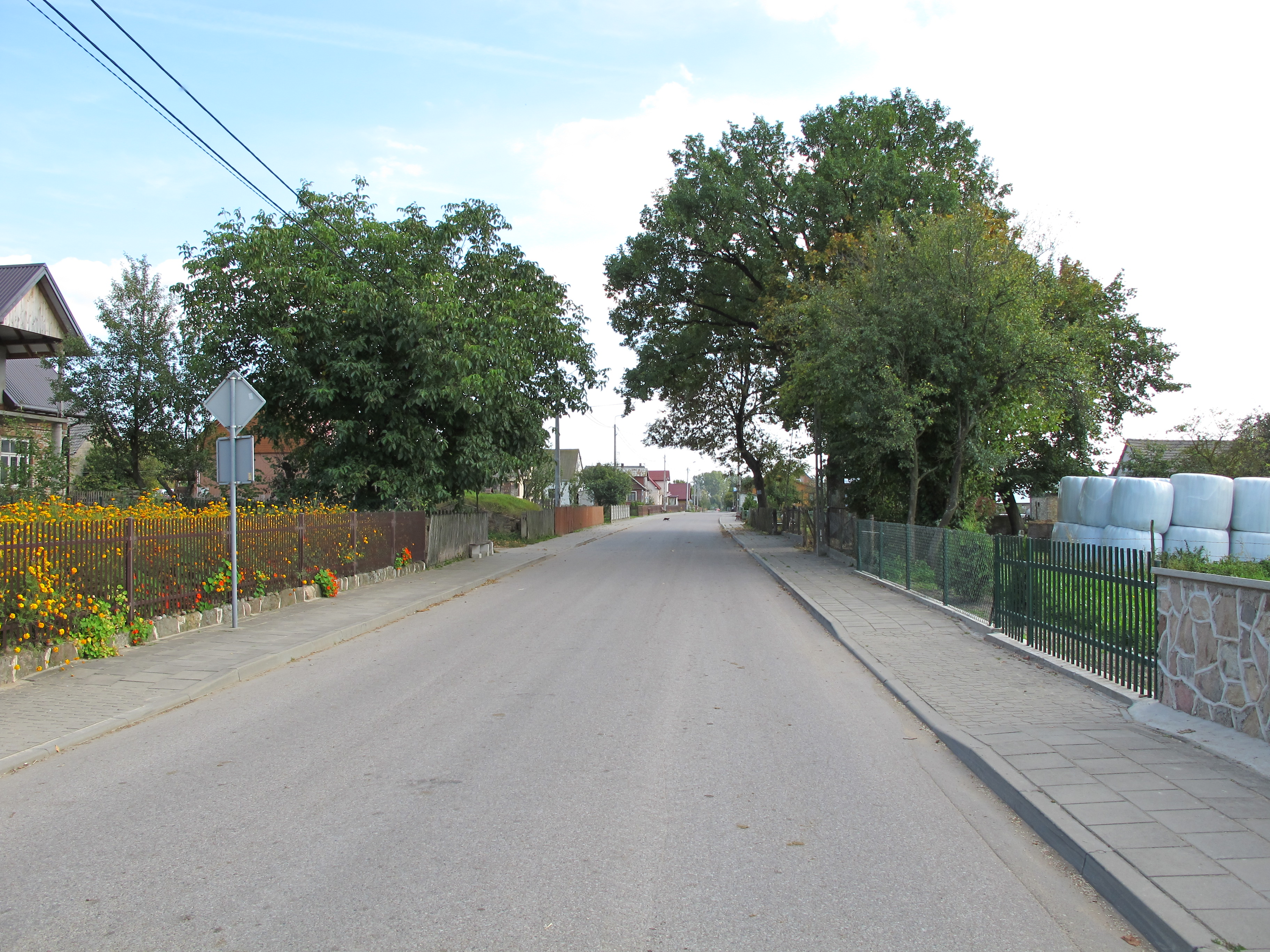

- Location within Poland
- Coordinates: 53°33′N 23°2′E
- Country: Poland
- Voivodeship: Podlaskie
- County: Sokółka
- Gmina: Suchowola

Jatwieź Mała [ˈjatfjɛɕ ˈmawa] is a village in the administrative district of Gmina Suchowola, within Sokółka County, Podlaskie Voivodeship, in north-eastern Poland.
