= Leśniki, Sokółka County =

Village in north-eastern Poland

Leśniki
- Village
- Location within Poland
- Coordinates: 53°37′N 23°9′E
- Country: Poland
- Voivodeship: Podlaskie
- County: Sokółka
- Gmina: Suchowola

Leśniki [lɛɕˈɲikʲi] is a village in the administrative district of Gmina Suchowola, within Sokółka County, Podlaskie Voivodeship, in north-eastern Poland.
