= Chlewisk Dolny =

- Village
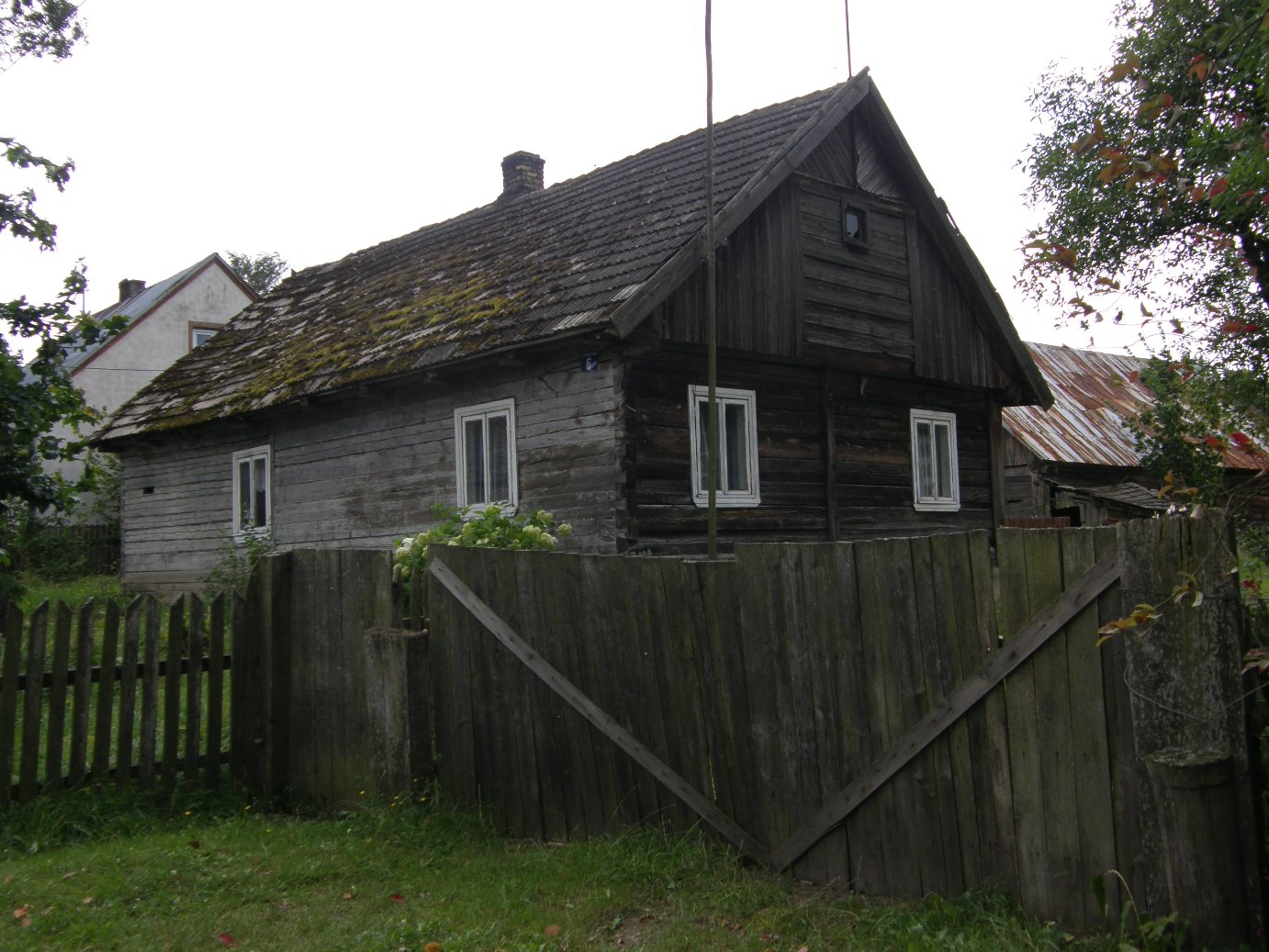

- Location within Poland
- Coordinates: 53°34′20″N 23°9′36″E
- Country: Poland
- Voivodeship: Podlaskie
- County: Sokółka
- Gmina: Suchowola
- Population: 20

Chlewisk Dolny [ˈxlɛvʲisk ˈdɔlnɨ] is a village in the administrative district of Gmina Suchowola, within Sokółka County, Podlaskie Voivodeship, in north-eastern Poland.
