= Gmina Suchowola =

Gmina Suchowola Suchowola Commune
- Gmina
- Coat of arms

- Gmina Suchowola within the Sokółka County
- Coordinates (Suchowola): 53°34′36″N 23°6′6″E
- Country: Poland
- Voivodeship: Podlaskie
- County: Sokółka
- Seat: Suchowola

Area
  - Total: 255.89 km^{2} (98.80 sq mi)

Population (2006)
  - Total: 7,350
  - Density: 28.7/km^{2} (74.4/sq mi)
  - Urban: 2,243
  - Rural: 5,107
- Website: http://www.suchowola.com.pl

Gmina Suchowola is an urban-rural gmina (administrative district) in Sokółka County, Podlaskie Voivodeship, in north-eastern Poland. Its seat is the town of Suchowola, which lies approximately 33 kilometres (21 mi) north-west of Sokółka and 52 km (32 mi) north of the regional capital Białystok.

The gmina covers an area of 255.89 square kilometres (98.8 sq mi), and as of 2006 its total population is 7,350 (out of which the population of Suchowola amounts to 2,243, and the population of the rural part of the gmina is 5,107).

== Villages ==
Apart from the town of Suchowola, Gmina Suchowola contains the villages and settlements of Bachmackie Kolonie, Brukowo, Chlewisk Dolny, Chlewisk Górny, Chmielniki, Chmielówka, Chodorówka Nowa, Chodorówka Stara, Chodorówka Stara-Kolonia, Ciemne, Czerwonka, Domuraty, Dryga, Dryga-Kolonia, Dubasiewskie Kolonie, Dubasiewszczyzna, Głęboczyzna, Grodzisk, Grymiaczki, Hołodolina, Horodnianka, Jatwieź Duża, Jatwieź Mała, Karpowicze, Kiersnówka, Kopciówka, Krzywa, Laudańszczyzna, Leśniki, Leszczany, Morgi, Nowe Stojło, Okopy, Olszanka, Ostrówek, Piątak, Podgrodzisk, Podhorodnianka, Podostrówek, Pokośno, Połomin, Połomin-Kolonia, Poświętne, Rutkowszczyzna, Sucha Góra, Tablewo, Trzyrzecze, Wólka, Żakle and Zgierszczańskie.

== Neighbouring gminas ==
Gmina Suchowola is bordered by the gminas of Dąbrowa Białostocka, Janów, Jaświły, Korycin and Sztabin.
