= Petras Būtėnas =

Lithuanian linguist and public figure

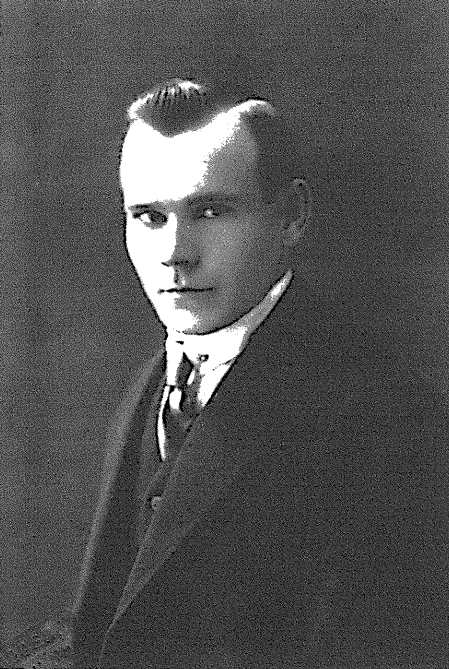
- Petras Būtėnas in 1922, as a student at the University of Lithuania
- Born: 27 June 1896; Dovydai, Joniškėlis parish, Russian Empire
- Died: 4 October 1980 (aged 84); Boston, United States
- Burial place: Toronto, Canada. Reburried in Panevėžys in 1996.

Academic background
- Education: Vytautas Magnus University

Petras Būtėnas (27 June 1896 – 4 October 1980) was a Lithuanian linguist and public figure. His work was very important in the research of Lithuanian culture.

== Early life ==
He had a younger brother Julijonas Būtėnas.

== Interwar ==
From 1919 to 1923, he was a volunteer soldier of the Lithuanian Army. Since 1920, he studied at the Higher Courses and since 1922 in the University of Lithuania. In 1930, Būtėnas graduated from Vytautas Magnus University. He was a student of Kazimieras Būga, Jonas Jablonskis and Juozas Balčikonis. From 1925 to 1944, Būtėnas worked as a teacher in Panevėžys. He taught in the town's teachers' seminary until 1936. Since 1939, he was a member of the Lithuanian Catholic Academy of Science.

== World War II ==
The Soviet authorities imprisoned Būtėnas from July 1940 to January 1941 in the Panevėžys Prison. Together with others, he published the weekly Išlaisvintasis panevėžietis ('The liberated Panevėžian') in 1941.

During 1941–1944, he was the director of Panevėžys Boys' Gymnasium. He left for Germany in 1944.

== In emigration ==
He organized courses for Lithuanian teachers and lead those courses in 1945–1948. In 1946, he prepared a summary for the Lithuanian language teachers' courses and gymnasium. From 1945 to 1948, he edited the newspaper Lietuvių informacija ('Lithuanian information'), and in 1946–1948, the magazine Žingsniai ('Steps'). Būtėnas moved to the US in 1949. He worked in the newspaper Keleivis ('Passenger') and in the editorial office of the Lithuanian Encyclopedia.

== Academic work ==
Būtėnas researched Lithuanian dialects, accentuation, and ancient ethnically Lithuanian territories. He contributed to the preparation of Lietuvių kalbos žodyno (Lithuanian Dictionary), to which he contributed more than 8,000 words. He collected folklore and prepared Lietuvių tautotyros žinių ir senienų rinkimo programą (Lithuanian Ethnography Knowledge and Antiquities Collection Program) in 1925. Būtėnas collected material for research on old Lithuanian toponymy.

== Bibliography ==
=== Books ===
- Kirčio ir priegaidės žinios (1926)
- Trumpas linksnių mokslas praktiškam lietuvių kalbos reikalui (1929)
- Lietuvių kalbos prielinksnių mokslas teorijai ir praktikai (1930)
- Priežodžio ir patarlės gyvenimas (1930)
- Lietuvių kalbos akcentologijos vadovėlis mokyklai ir gyvenimui (1931)
- Augštaičių tarmės akuojančios pašneklės sienos (1932)

=== Articles ===
1956

- Būtėnas, Petras (September 1956). "Vytauto Didžiojo vasaros pilis" [The Summer Castle of Vytautas the Great] (PDF). Karys (in Lithuanian). 8 (1324): 259–261.
- Būtėnas, Petras (October 1956). "Vytauto Didžiojo vasaros pilis" [The Summer Castle of Vytautas the Great] (PDF). Karys (in Lithuanian). 9 (1325): 306–308.

1957

- Būtėnas, Petras (December 1957). "Sudūviai - Jotvingiai - Dainuviai" (PDF). Karys (in Lithuanian). 10 (1337): 314–316.

1962

- Būtėnas, Petras (April 1962). "Baltų žemės falsifikatas" [Falsification of the Baltic land] (PDF). Karys (in Lithuanian). 4 (1381): 105–115.

1963

- Būtėnas, Petras (February 1963). "Paslaptingieji sudūviai" [Mysterious Sudovians] (PDF). Karys (in Lithuanian). 2 (1389): 36–43.
- Būtėnas, Petras (May 1963). "Lietuvos valstybės įsikūrimas" [Establishment of the Lithuanian state] (PDF). Karys (in Lithuanian). 5 (1392): 130–134.

1964

- Būtėnas, Petras (January 1964). "Gal praverstų?!" [Maybe it would be useful?!] (PDF). Karys (in Lithuanian). 1 (1398): 2–7.
- Būtėnas, Petras (February 1964). "Gal praverstų?!" [Maybe it would be useful?!] (PDF). Karys (in Lithuanian). 2 (1399): 45–48.
- Būtėnas, Petras (March 1964). "Gal praverstų?!" [Maybe it would be useful?!] (PDF). Karys (in Lithuanian). 3 (1400): 74–82.
- Būtėnas, Petras (April 1964). "Lietuva ir jos kaimynai" [Lithuania and its neighbors] (PDF). Karys (in Lithuanian). 4 (1401): 107–110.
- Būtėnas, Petras (October 1964). "Karas ir politika: Kristijono Donelaičio "Metuose"" [War and Politics: In Kristijonas Donelaitis' "The Seasons"] (PDF). Karys (in Lithuanian). 8 (1405): 236–238.

1965

- Būtėnas, Petras (January 1965). "Nevertinę jūros" (PDF). Karys (in Lithuanian). 1 (1408): 7–10.
- Būtėnas, Petras (May 1965). "Prūso tautovardžio amžiaus prailginimas mažiausia 130 metų" [Prolongation of the age of Prussian nation's name by at least 130 years] (PDF). Karys (in Lithuanian). 5 (1412): 140–142.
- Būtėnas, Petras (June 1965). "Prūso tautovardžio amžiaus prailginimas mažiausia 130 metų" [Prolongation of the age of Prussian nation's name by at least 130 years] (PDF). Karys (in Lithuanian). 6 (1413): 168–171.

1966

- Būtėnas, Petras (January 1966). "Vėl sienos" [The borders again] (PDF). Karys (in Lithuanian). 1 (1418): 2–7.
- Būtėnas, Petras (March 1966). "Priešmindauginė Lietuva" [Pre-Mindaugas Lithuania] (PDF). Karys (in Lithuanian). 3 (1420): 72–75.
- Būtėnas, Petras (July 1966). "Premijuotina mūsų istorijos painiava" [Awardable confusion of our history] (PDF). Karys (in Lithuanian). 7 (1424): 198–201.
- Būtėnas, Petras (August 1966). "Premijuotina mūsų istorijos painiava" [Awardable confusion of our history] (PDF). Karys (in Lithuanian). 8 (1425): 228–233.

1967

- Būtėnas, Petras (January 1967). "Tvirmedės pilis" [Tvirmedė castle] (PDF). Karys (in Lithuanian). 1 (1428): 10–13.
- Būtėnas, Petras (February 1967). "Velikorosų-rusų okupacijos" [Velikorus-Russian occupation] (PDF). Karys (in Lithuanian). 2 (1429): 45–47.
- Būtėnas, Petras (June 1967). "Ten lietuvių, ne gudo šalis!" [That's the land of Lithuanians, not Belarusians!] (PDF). Karys (in Lithuanian). 6 (1433): 162–170.

1968

- Būtėnas, Petras (January 1968). "Lietuvos karalystė" [Kingdom of Lithuania] (PDF). Karys (in Lithuanian). 1 (1438): 5–8.
- Būtėnas, Petras (February 1968). "Lietuvos karalystė" [Kingdom of Lithuania] (PDF). Karys (in Lithuanian). 2 (1439): 44–47.

1970

- Būtėnas, Petras (May 1970). "Paskutinis žodis" [The last word] (PDF). Karys (in Lithuanian). 5 (1462): 129–137.
- Būtėnas, Petras (June 1970). "Paskutinis žodis" [The last word] (PDF). Karys (in Lithuanian). 6 (1463): 170–174.

1971

- Būtėnas, Petras (June 1971). "Karalius-Kuningas" (PDF). Karys (in Lithuanian). 6 (1473): 193–197.

== Awards ==
- 1935 – 4th Class of the Order of the Lithuanian Grand Duke Gediminas.

== Sources ==
- Lapinskienė, Lionė (2003). "Petro Būtėno "Lietuvių tautotyros žinių ir senienų rinkimo programa"" (PDF). Liaudies kultūra (in Lithuanian). 1: 44–53.
- Zinkevičius, Zigmas (2003). "Petras Būtėnas". Visuotinė lietuvių enciklopedija. Vol. III (Beketeriai-Chakasai). Vilnius: Mokslo ir enciklopedijų leidybos institutas.
