= Chodorówka Nowa =

Village in Gmina Suchowola, Poland

- Village
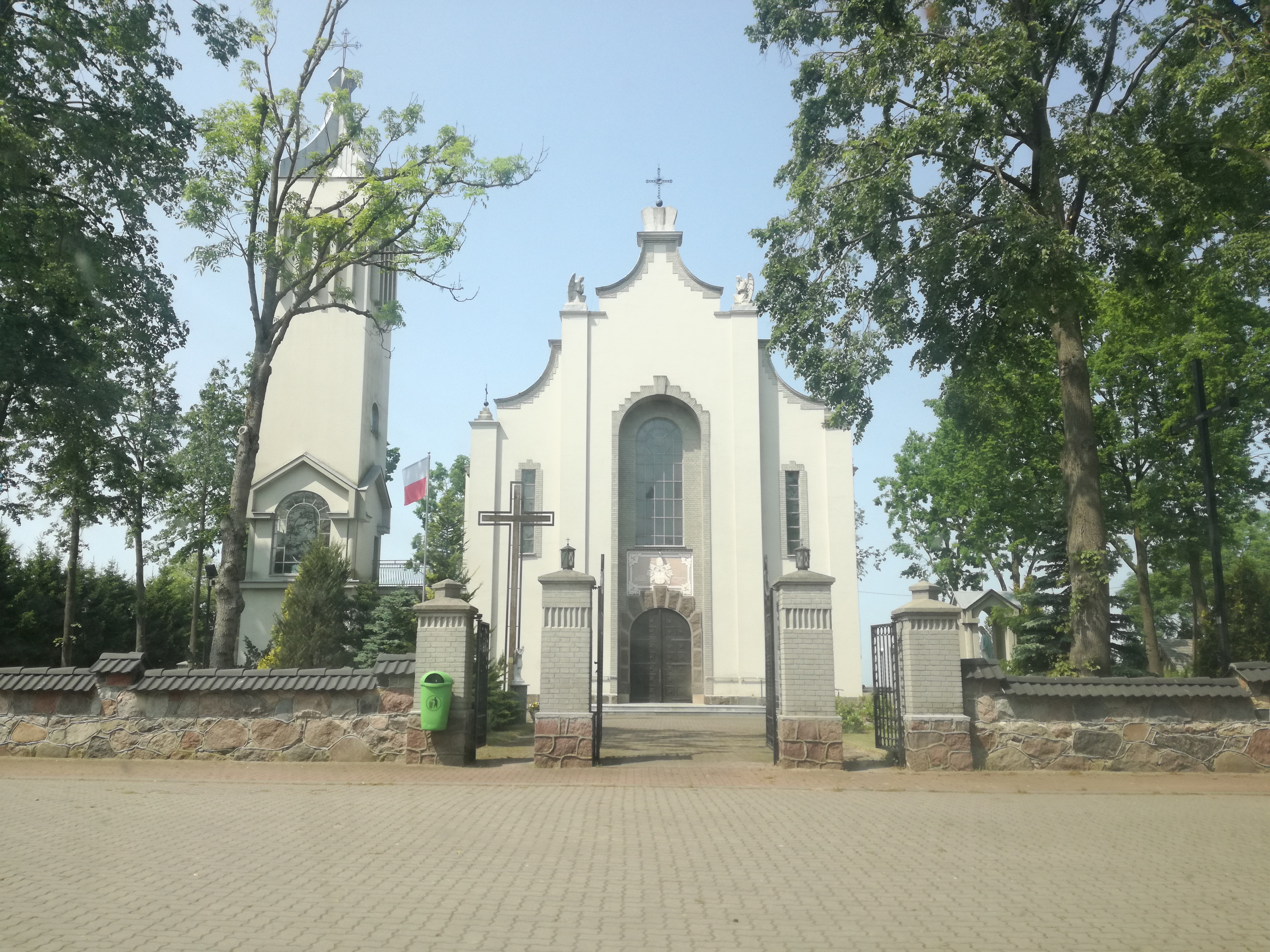
- Church of Our Lady of Consolation in Chodorówka Nowa

- Location within Poland
- Coordinates: 53°32′06″N 23°06′17″E
- Country: Poland
- Voivodeship: Podlaskie
- County: Sokółka
- Gmina: Suchowola
- Time zone: UTC+1 (CET)
  - Summer (DST): UTC+2 (CEST)
- Vehicle registration: BSK

Chodorówka Nowa [xɔdɔˈrufka ˈnɔva] is a village in the administrative district of Gmina Suchowola, within Sokółka County, Podlaskie Voivodeship, in north-eastern Poland.

In Chodorówka Nowa, there is a mass grave of Polish insurgents massacred by the Russians in nearby Domuraty in 1863.
