= Chmielniki, Podlaskie Voivodeship =

Chmielniki
- Village
- Location within Poland
- Coordinates: 53°38′59″N 23°8′55″E
- Country: Poland
- Voivodeship: Podlaskie
- County: Sokółka
- Gmina: Suchowola
- Population: 110

Chmielniki [xmʲɛlˈɲikʲi] is a village in the administrative district of Gmina Suchowola, within Sokółka County, Podlaskie Voivodeship, in north-eastern Poland.
