= Podhorodnianka =

- Village
- Location within Poland
- Coordinates: 53°40′N 23°7′E
- Country: Poland
- Voivodeship: Podlaskie
- County: Sokółka
- Gmina: Suchowola

Podhorodnianka [pɔtxɔrɔdˈɲaŋka] is a village in the administrative district of Gmina Suchowola, within Sokółka County, Podlaskie Voivodeship, in north-eastern Poland.
