= Olszanka, Sokółka County =

Olszanka
- Village
- Location within Poland
- Coordinates: 53°33′N 23°13′E
- Country: Poland
- Voivodeship: Podlaskie
- County: Sokółka
- Gmina: Suchowola
- Population: 85

Olszanka [ɔlˈʂaŋka] is a village in the administrative district of Gmina Suchowola, within Sokółka County, Podlaskie Voivodeship, Poland.
