= Żakle =

- Village
- Location within Poland
- Coordinates: 53°39′21″N 23°05′24″E
- Country: Poland
- Voivodeship: Podlaskie
- County: Sokółka
- Gmina: Suchowola

Żakle [ˈʐaklɛ] is a village in the administrative district of Gmina Suchowola, within Sokółka County, Podlaskie Voivodeship, in north-eastern Poland.
