= Podgrodzisk =

- Village
- Location within Poland
- Coordinates: 53°37′22″N 23°09′59″E
- Country: Poland
- Voivodeship: Podlaskie
- County: Sokółka
- Gmina: Suchowola

Podgrodzisk [pɔdˈɡrɔd͡ʑisk] is a village in the administrative district of Gmina Suchowola, within Sokółka County, Podlaskie Voivodeship, in north-eastern Poland.
