= Grymiaczki =

- Village
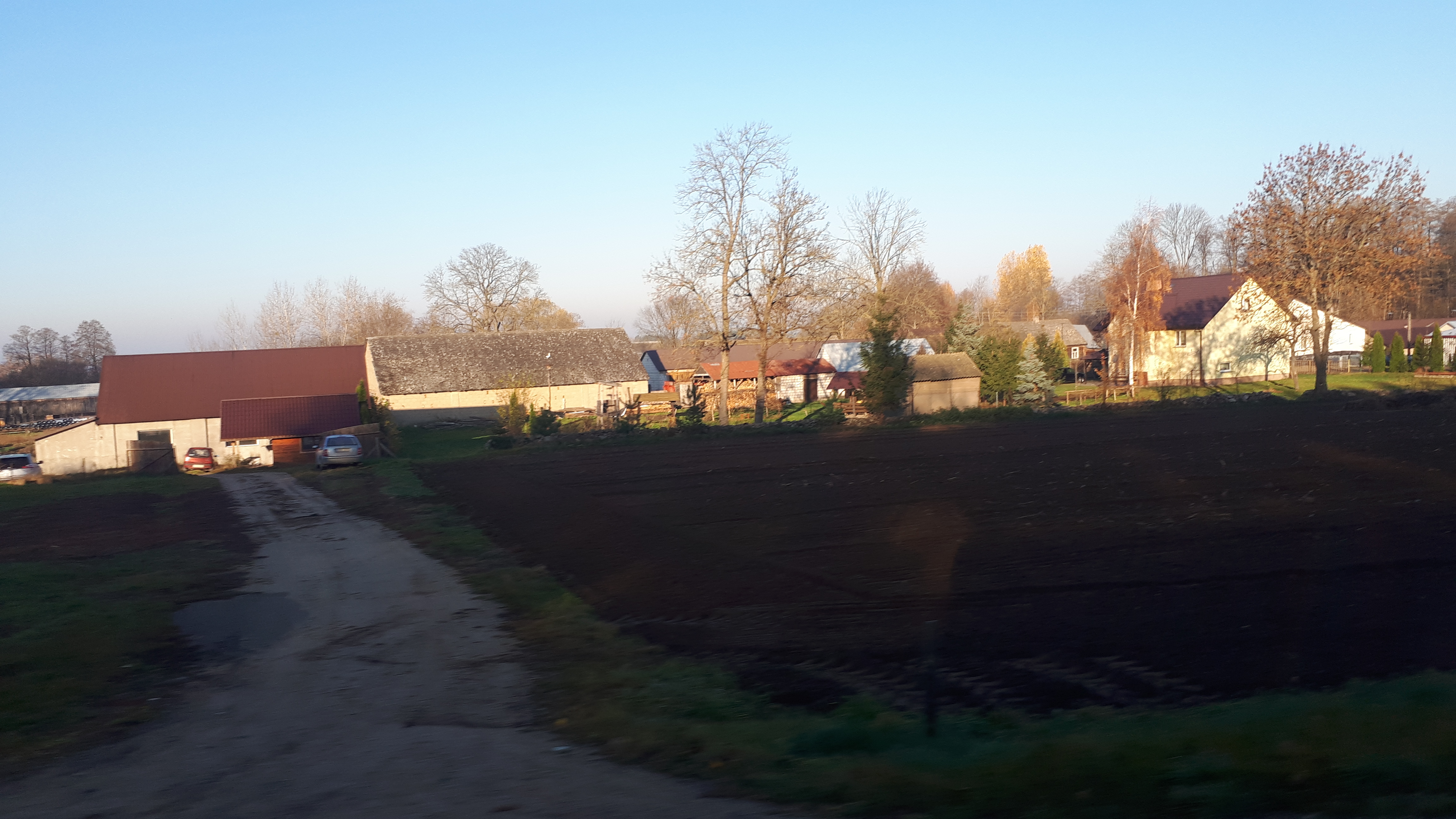

- Location within Poland
- Coordinates: 53°36′48″N 23°07′03″E
- Country: Poland
- Voivodeship: Podlaskie
- County: Sokółka
- Gmina: Suchowola

Grymiaczki [ɡrɨˈmʲat͡ʂkʲi] is a village in the administrative district of Gmina Suchowola, within Sokółka County, Podlaskie Voivodeship, in north-eastern Poland.
