= Morgi, Sokółka County =

Morgi
- Village
- Location within Poland
- Coordinates: 53°34′N 23°13′E
- Country: Poland
- Voivodeship: Podlaskie
- County: Sokółka
- Gmina: Suchowola

Morgi [ˈmɔrɡʲi] is a village in the administrative district of Gmina Suchowola, within Sokółka County, Podlaskie Voivodeship, in north-eastern Poland.
