= Pokośno =

- Village
- Location within Poland
- Coordinates: 53°36′13″N 23°11′26″E
- Country: Poland
- Voivodeship: Podlaskie
- County: Sokółka
- Gmina: Suchowola
- Population: 150
- Time zone: UTC+1 (CET)
  - Summer (DST): UTC+2 (CEST)
- Vehicle registration: BSK

Pokośno [pɔˈkɔɕnɔ] is a village in the administrative district of Gmina Suchowola, within Sokółka County, northeast Poland.
