= Hołodolina =

- Village
- Location within Poland
- Coordinates: 53°32′26″N 23°13′41″E
- Country: Poland
- Voivodeship: Podlaskie
- County: Sokółka
- Gmina: Suchowola

Hołodolina [xɔwɔdɔˈlʲina] is a village in the administrative district of Gmina Suchowola, within Sokółka County, Podlaskie Voivodeship, in north-eastern Poland.
