= Dryga-Kolonia =

- Village
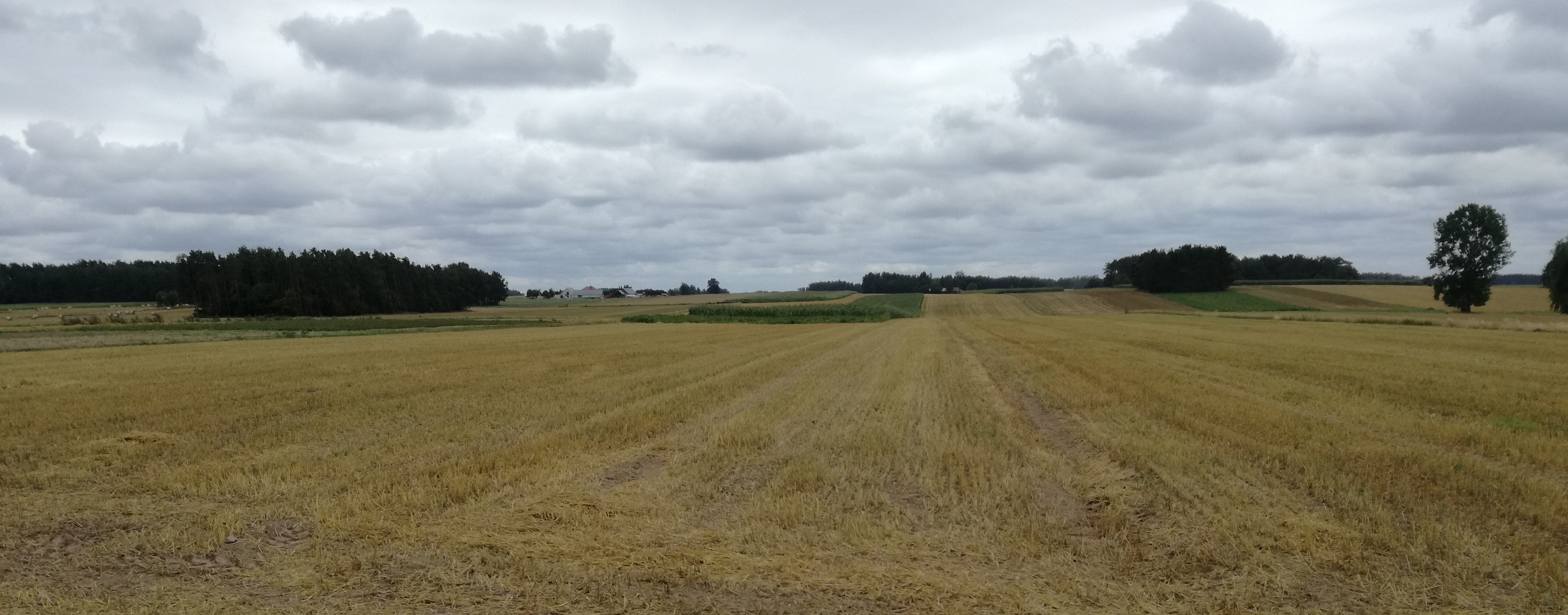

- Location within Poland
- Coordinates: 53°30′26″N 23°09′48″E
- Country: Poland
- Voivodeship: Podlaskie
- County: Sokółka
- Gmina: Suchowola

Dryga-Kolonia [ˈdrɨɡa kɔˈlɔɲa] is a village in the administrative district of Gmina Suchowola, within Sokółka County, Podlaskie Voivodeship, in north-eastern Poland.
