= Jatwieź Duża =

- Village
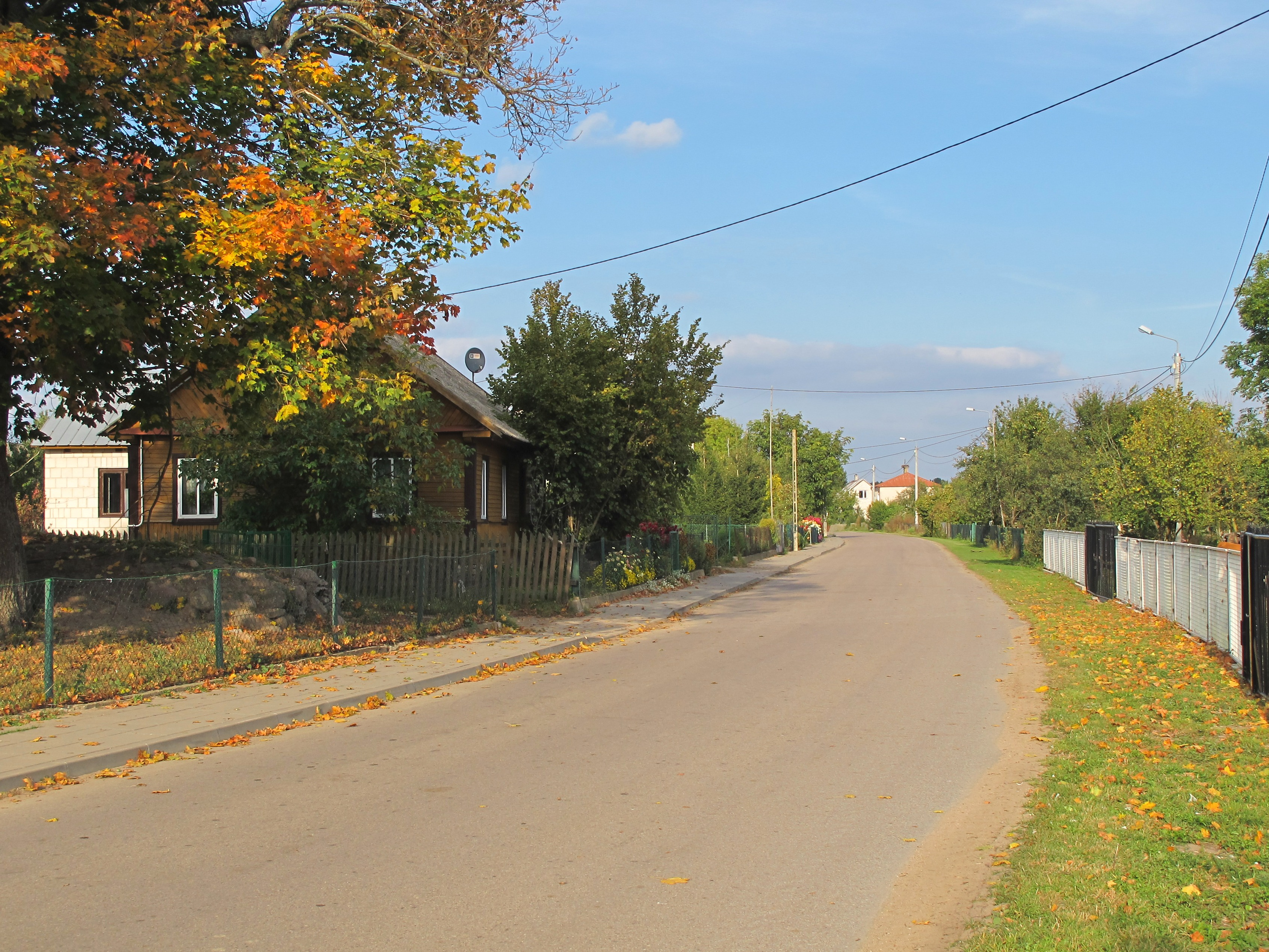

- Location within Poland
- Coordinates: 53°32′N 23°1′E
- Country: Poland
- Voivodeship: Podlaskie
- County: Sokółka
- Gmina: Suchowola
- Population: 330

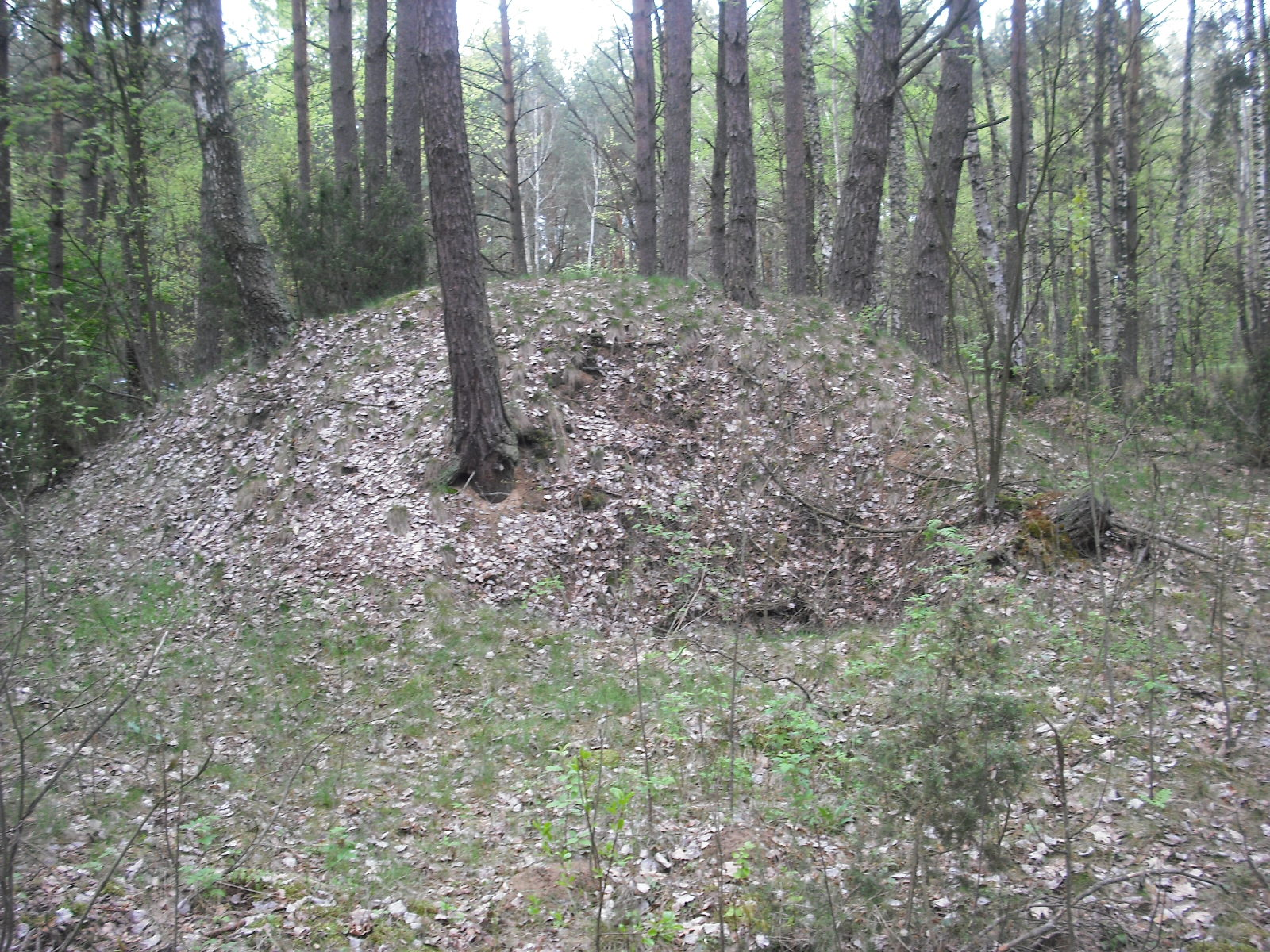
Pagan Sudovian (Yotvingia) cemetery in the area of Jatwieź Duża

Jatwieź Duża [ˈjatfʲɛɕ ˈduʐa] is a village in the administrative district of Gmina Suchowola, within Sokółka County, Podlaskie Voivodeship, in north-eastern Poland.
