= Sucha Góra, Podlaskie Voivodeship =

Sucha Góra
- Village
- Location within Poland
- Coordinates: 53°32′3″N 23°14′53″E
- Country: Poland
- Voivodeship: Podlaskie
- County: Sokółka
- Gmina: Suchowola

Sucha Góra [ˈsuxa ˈɡura] is a village in the administrative district of Gmina Suchowola, within Sokółka County, Podlaskie Voivodeship, in north-eastern Poland.
