= Leszczany, Gmina Suchowola =

Leszczany
- Village
- Location within Poland
- Coordinates: 53°36′13″N 23°10′31″E
- Country: Poland
- Voivodeship: Podlaskie
- County: Sokółka
- Gmina: Suchowola

Leszczany [lɛʂˈt͡ʂanɨ] is a village in the administrative district of Gmina Suchowola, within Sokółka County, Podlaskie Voivodeship, in north-eastern Poland.
