= Karys =

Lithuanian-language military magazine

Karys (literary: soldier) is a Lithuanian-language military magazine published since 1919. It is a magazine about the Lithuanian Army and is geared towards the soldiers and the general public. During the interwar period (1919–1940) it was published weekly in Kaunas by the Ministry of National Defence of Lithuania and the General Staff of Lithuania. During World War II, it was a magazine of the Lithuanian Auxiliary Police Battalions. During the Soviet period (1950–1990), it was published monthly by Lithuanian veterans in New York. After the restoration of independence in 1990, it is once again published monthly by the Ministry of Defence. The circulation was 4,000 copies in 1920, 33,000 copies in 1940, 1,650 copies in 1983, 22,000 copies in 1991, 3,000 copies in 2005.

== History ==
=== Interwar ===
The first 8-page issue appeared on 22 May 1919 titled Kariškių žodis (Word of Soldiers) in Kaunas. At the time, the newly established Lithuanian Army was fighting in the Lithuanian–Soviet War. The magazine was renamed to Karys in October 1920 by editor Jonas Laurinaitis who believed that kariškis is not a proper Lithuanian word. The weekly magazine printed military news, reports from soldiers' lives, memoirs from the Lithuanian Wars of Independence, popular science articles on military science or weapons, works of literary fiction, humorous anecdotes. It also published one-time supplements on individual units of the Lithuanian Army.

When military education became compulsory in Lithuanian schools in 1929, Karys was distributed among students as well. To attract them, poetry and short story contests were organized. Under editor Simas Urbonas (1936–1940), the magazine grew to 28 pages and increased publication frequency to twice a week. At the time, it was a richly illustrated magazine printed using intaglio technique. In the first 20 years, Karys had some 5,000 contributors. The number of contributors grew from 26 in 1919, to 65 in 1923, 148 in 1926, 256 in 1929, 414 in 1931, to about 500 in 1935–1938.

=== World War II ===
When Lithuania was occupied by the Soviet Union in June 1940, Karys was discontinued and replaced by pro-Soviet daily Karių tiesa (Soldiers' Truth) on 6 July 1940. When Germany invaded the Soviet Union in June 1941, Karys was reestablished in Vilnius as the weekly magazine of the Lithuanian Auxiliary Police Battalions on 23 December 1941. It also served as recruitment platform for the Lithuanian Territorial Defense Force of General Povilas Plechavičius in early 1944.

Despite heavy censorship and lack of paper, editor Urbonas managed to increase the circulation to up to 40,000 copies. The anniversary edition in May 1944 was marked by a 20-page issue printed in color. In mid-1944, Lithuania was re-occupied by the Soviet Union as a result of the Operation Bagration and Karys was discontinued. Most of its editors and contributors fled to Germany ahead of the advancing Red Army. The magazine was briefly revived in Berlin and Weimar as a supplement to newspaper Lietuvis.

=== United States ===
The magazine was revived again in United States by Stasys Butkus, secretary of the editorial board of Karys since the first issues who continued to work on Karys until his death in 1961, and Augustas Astrauskas who agreed to provide financial support. They invited Urbonas to resume editorship. The first issue (24 pages) appeared on 23 November 1950. The monthly magazine reoriented itself to cater to Lithuanian veterans, both privates and officers, thus merging the traditions of pre-war Karys and Kardas. After Urbonas had to resign due to health issues, Domas Penikas became the editor. During his tenure the circulation dropped to just 250 copies.

In 1954, the publication was taken over by the New York chapter of Ramovė, an organization of Lithuanian officers, and Zigmantas Raulinaitis became the new editor. It was an unpaid position but over 30 years of his editorship, Raulinaitis displayed great enthusiasm and dedication. The circulation recovered and the number of subscribers exceeded 1,000. In 1958–1973, Karys published Tremties trimitas (Trumpet of Exile, a homage to the pre-war Trimitas), a supplement for members of the former Lithuanian Riflemen's Union. By 1970s and 1980s, it was becoming more and more difficult to find contributors as the older generation that actually served in the Lithuanian armed forces was naturally dying off.

When Dr. Kazys Ėringis defected in 1981, he contributed a series of articles over four years on the gradual destruction of the Lithuanian Army by the Soviet Union. The articles were published as a separate book in 1993. Other series were published separately as well: memoirs by Jonas Abraitis on Grand Duke Gediminas Staff Battalion, memoirs of Juozas Klimas on his wartime experiences, three-act drama by Anatolijus Kairys on Romas Kalanta.

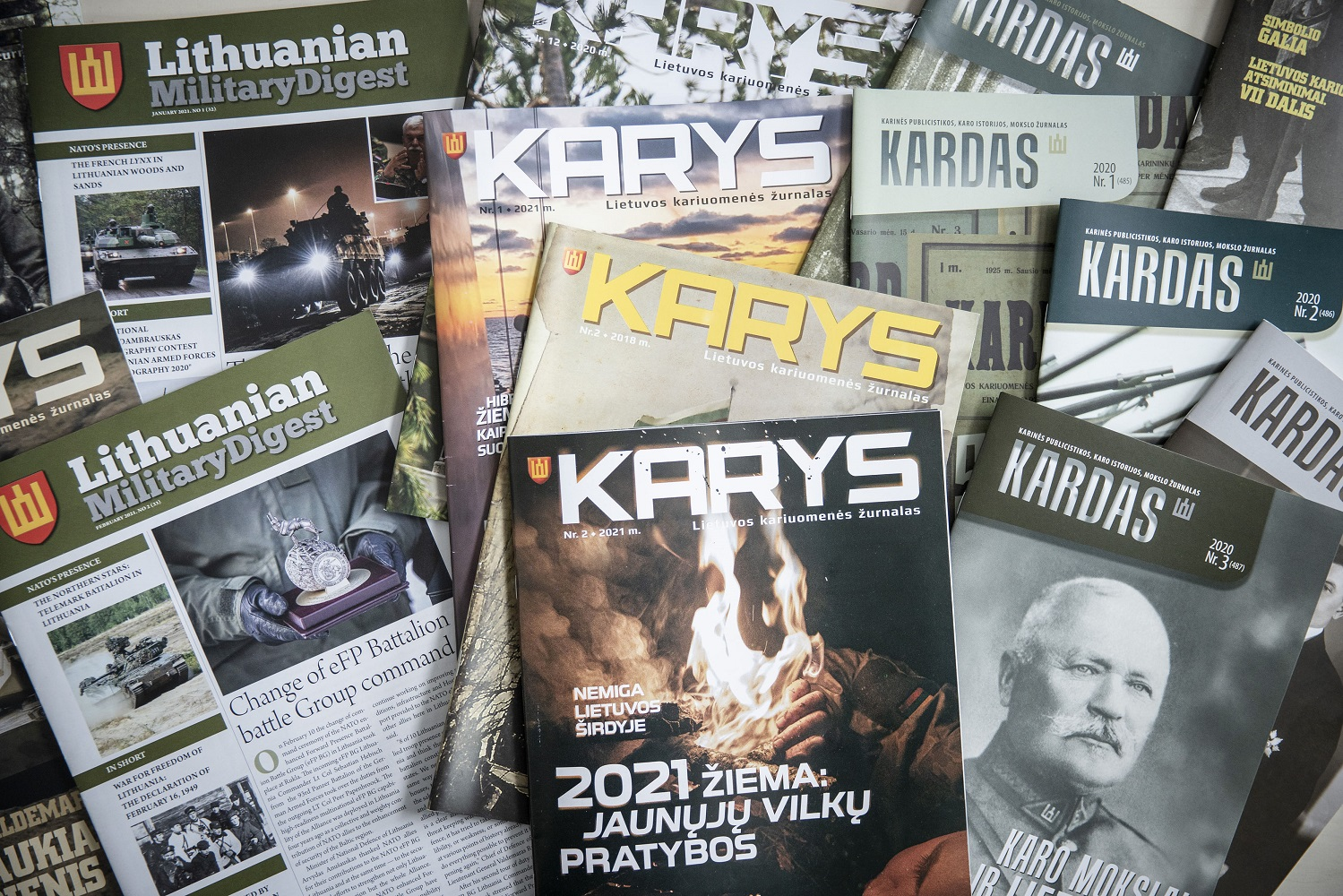
Karys journals

=== Return to Lithuania ===
In January 1991, Kardas was reestablished in Vilnius by the Ministry of National Defence of Lithuania, but the magazine continued to be published in the United States for another year due to the precarious situation of the newly independent Lithuania. In 1991–2001, the magazine was published twice a month. From 2002, it became a monthly.

== Editors ==
Magazine's editors were:

- Major Petras Ruseckas: first issue and 13 December 1922 – 4 November 1925
- Lieutenant colonel Vytautas Steponaitis: 25 May 1919 – 24 March 1920
- Lieutenant colonel Jonas Laurinaitis: 25 March 1920 – 29 September 1921
- Reserve lieutenant Kazys Kepalas: 30 September 1921 – 1 February 1922
- Military official Juozas Petrėnas: 2 February 1922 – 8 September 1922
- Military official Zigmantas Kuzmickas: 9 September 1922 – 12 December 1922
- Reserve captain Antanas Majus: 12 November 1925 – 3 February 1926
- Reserve major Juozas Tomkus: 4 February 1926 – 29 June 1926
- Reserve lieutenant colonel Romualdas Burokas: 30 June 1926 – 15 March 1927 and 7 September 1927 – 6 March 1928
- Reserve lieutenant Tadas Šakmanas: 16 March 1927 – 6 September 1926
- Reserve lieutenant Stanislovas Kuizinas: 7 March 1928 – 10 October 1928
- Lieutenant colonel Juozas Balčiūnas-Švaistas: 11 October 1928 – 24 November 1935
- Major Petras Jakštas: 25 November 1935 – 18 March 1936
- Captain Simas Urbonas (Simonas Urbanavičius): 1936–1940, 1941–1944, and 1950–1951
- Bronius Aušrotas: 1945
- Domas Penikas: 1951–1954
- Zigmantas Raulinaitis: 1954–1984
- Balys Raugas: 1985–1991
- Bronius Čekanauskas: 1991–1993
- Kęstutis Starinskas: 1994–1998
- Alina Meilūnaitė-Vaišvilienė: 1999–2004, 2006 (4 issues), 2009 (one issue), 2010 (six issues)
- Kazys Jonušas: 2004–2012 (with breaks)
- Darius Varanavičius: since 2012
