= Vladimir Zubov =

Russian nobleman

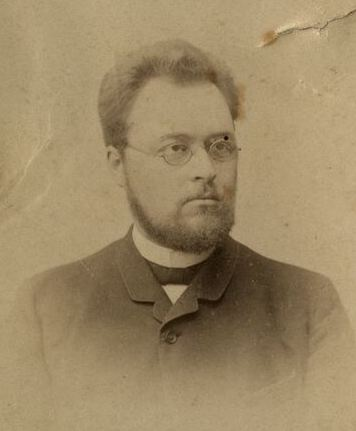
- Zubov in 1880s
- Born: 13 February 1862; Šiauliai, Russian Empire
- Died: 23 June 1933 (aged 71); Medemrodė, Lithuania
- Education: University of Saint Petersburg; University of Halle-Wittenberg
- Occupations: Landowner, agronomer
- Spouse: Sofija Bilevičiūtė-Zubovienė
- Children: Vladimiras Zubovas; Aleksandra Zubovaitė-Fledžinskienė

Graf Vladimir Zubov (Russian: Владимир Зубов, Polish: Włodzimierz Zubow, Lithuanian: Vladimiras Zubovas; 1862–1933) was a liberal nobleman from the Russian Zubov family who supported the Lithuanian National Revival.

Educated in chemistry and veterinary at the universities of Saint Petersburg and Halle-Wittenberg, Zubov implemented innovative agricultural methods in the large estates that he inherited around Šiauliai. He transformed Ginkūnai Manor into a modern farm operation and was the first to import Danish Red cows. He supported socialist and social democratic ideas and often hosted meetings of various activists. During one such gatherings in Zubov's Dabikinė Manor, Povilas Višinskis and others founded the Lithuanian Democratic Party in 1902. Zubov even sheltered escaped Vincas Kapsukas from the Tsarist police in 1914. He also founded and financed six primary schools for manor workers and other villagers. Despite the Lithuanian press ban, these schools taught the Lithuanian language. He funded a public library and gifted Zubovai Palace to teacher's seminary in Šiauliai.

== Biography ==
=== Early life and education ===
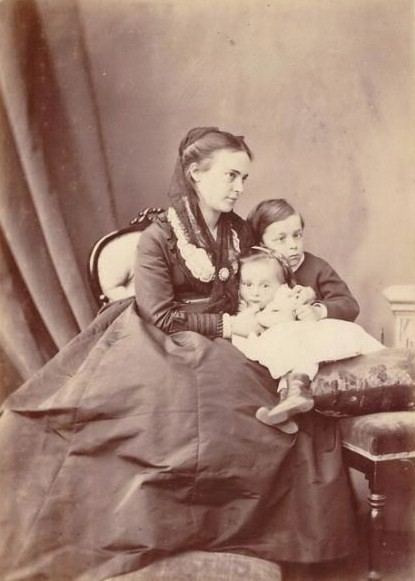
Zubov as a child with his mother Alexandra and sister Maria

After the Third Partition of the Polish–Lithuanian Commonwealth, Platon Zubov, one of the favorites of Empress Catherine the Great, was gifted former lands of the Grand Duke of Lithuania in 1795. This included Šiauliai Economy (approximately 170,000 hectares (420,000 acres) of land with 18,000 residents) which was part of the lands of the Grand Duke of Lithuania. These territories were inherited by Platon's brother Dmitry who moved to live in Šiauliai where his great-grandson Vladimir Zubov was born on 13 February 1862 to the family of Nikolai and Alexandra Zubov (daughter of Vasily Olsufiev).

In 1871, Laurynas Ivinskis, a Lithuanian activist and publisher of the first Lithuanian calendars, was hired as a private tutor for Zubov. They became close and Zubov started learning Lithuanian language. In 1873, Zubov enrolled into Šiauliai Gymnasium. Already as a high school student Zubov joined antigovernment activities. With support of his mother and using his family's personal library, Zubov established an illegal library among gymnasium students. Several banned books from the library were confiscated by the police.

After graduation in 1881, he began studies of chemistry at the University of Saint Petersburg. One of his professors was Dmitri Mendeleev. He established contacts with socialist and even revolutionary activists, including members of Russian Narodnaya Volya and Polish Proletariat, he was also member of "Polish Commune" (Polish: Gmina Polska). His apartment was a frequent gathering place for various activists. According to memoirs of Jonas Šliūpas, up to 40 students would gather in the apartment. In 1882, after a student protest, Zubov was briefly imprisoned. However, that did not dissuade Zubov of liberal ideas. Eventually, he rejected revolutionary path and chose slower and steadier evolutionary activities. In 1890, Zubov graduated from veterinary studies at the University of Halle-Wittenberg.

=== Business activities ===
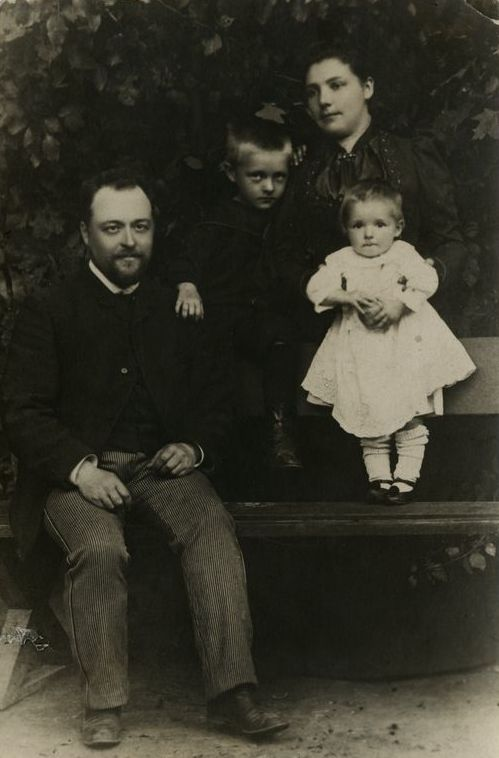
Zubov and Sofija Bilevičiūtė with their children

After his studies, Zubov returned to Lithuania and took up residence in Ginkūnai Manor. He also purchased Dabikinė Manor in 1890 and Medemrodė Manor (now part of Agluonai in present-day Akmenė District Municipality) in 1904. In a few years, Zubov transformed the neglected Ginkūnai Manor into an exemplary modern farm. He implemented various innovations. He purchased quality seeds and animal breeds as well as farming equipment abroad. In 1892, he became the first to import Danish Red cows which mixed with local cows to eventually produce the Lithuanian Red breed. He treated farm workers well and paid them higher than standard wages.

In 1908, Zubov established a dairy which became known for its butter. He also co-founded a credit union and Progresas, a company trading in fertilizers and agricultural equipment. Together with his brother, Zubov was a member of a committee which organized agricultural exhibitions in Šiauliai in 1910–1914. Due to their influence, the exhibitions were more relevant to Lithuanian peasants and featured performances by the Varpas Society of which Zubov was a member.

Zubov was also active in Šiauliai political and cultural life. He was consistently elected to the City Duma. In 1911, with 10,400 rubles worth of declared real estate in the city, Zubov was the wealthiest duma member. He also lent money to the city for public work projects and allowed the public to use the park around his Zubovai Palace.

=== Socialist activities ===
He continued to support socialist and social democratic activists and their press. His manors served as a meeting place or a temporary shelter for prosecuted activists. During one such gatherings in Zubov's Dabikinė Manor, Povilas Višinskis and others founded the Lithuanian Democratic Party in October 1902. In August 1905, during the Russian Revolution, Ginkūnai hosted a gathering of Draugas Society (Friend) organized by Vincas Kapsukas. The society resolved to mount armed resistance against the Tsarist government and organize worker strikes.

The notable activists who sought refuge in Zubov's estates included Józef Piłsudski and Vincas Kapsukas who escaped deportation and was hiding from the Tsarist police in 1914. His manor was also a meeting place for Polish revolutionaries from Warsaw, Moscow and St. Petersburg: Ludwik Waryński, Stanisław Narutowicz and Tadeusz Rechniewski, among others. Zubov considered himself a Pole at the time and supported the activities of Polish revolutionaries. However, after divorcing Sofija Bilevičiūtė-Zubovienė and marrying a Russian woman, he distanced himself from the Polish cause.

Zubov also helped smuggle the banned Lithuanian publications from East Prussia. Reportedly, he used empty barrels from his Gubernija brewery to hide and transport the publications. Right after the Lithuanian press ban was lifted in early 1904, Zubov planned to publish a Lithuanian weekly newspaper and wanted to hire Povilas Višinskis as its editor, but he could not receive government permission.

=== Support of education ===
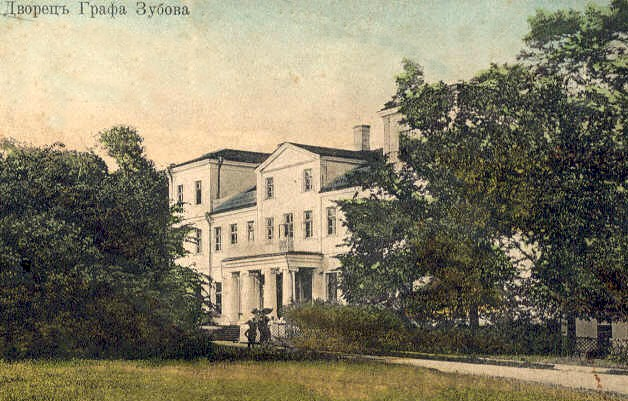
Zubovai Palace which Zubov donated to teacher's seminary

Zubov and his wife Sofija Bilevičiūtė-Zubovienė established six primary schools for manor workers and peasants. These schools were private and financed by Zubovs. Due to the Lithuanian press ban, the first school in Ginkūnai was opened in 1896 illegally and in secret (see: clandestine Lithuanian schools). Later this and other schools in Dabikinė, Naisiai, Gubernija (now northern part of Šiauliai), Medemrodė were legalized. It meant that they had to teach according to the Russian government curriculum, but the schools secretly taught Lithuanian language, history, and geography. Zubovs invited Lithuanian teachers, including Jadvyga Juškytė, and paid them a generous salary. Reportedly, Zubov spent as much as 10,000 rubles annually on the schools. In 1910, Rygos garsas reported that Zubovs maintained six primary schools with eight teachers attended for free by 300 students. Each school had a small library.

In 1902, Zubov sponsored a public library in Šiauliai. He donated books as well as the second floor of his Zubovai Palace. He also donated 27,778 volumes of the historical archive of Šiauliai Economy; however, this archive was lost during World War I. In 1914, he planned to open Teacher's Seminary in Šiauliai but these plans were interrupted by World War I. When the seminary was established in 1920, Zubov donated the entire Zubovai Palace for its needs. The seminary grew to become Šiauliai University.

=== World War I and after ===
During World War I, Zubov lived in Saint Petersburg where he co-founded the weekly newspaper Naujoji Lietuva (New Lithuania) and was elected chairman of the charitable Grūdas Society (Grain) to support war refugees. At the end of 1917, the society maintained four shelters, seven primary schools, and seven evening courses for adults. After Lithuania became independent in 1918, Zubov did not join Lithuanian political life and led a rather reclusive life in his rural estate. Many of his landholdings were nationalized and distributed to landless farm workers during the Land Reform of 1922. He was left with 212 hectares (520 acres) in Ginkūnai (owned by his daughter Aleksandra) and 300 ha (740 acres) each in Medemrodė (owned by him) and Dabikinė (owned by his son Vladimiras). The government nationalized 532 ha (1,310 acres) in Dabikinė and 1,229 ha (3,040 acres) in Medemrodė (most of this land were forests).

Zubov died on 23 June 1933 in Medemrodė.

== Personal life ==
In 1884, Zubov married Sofija Bilevičiūtė from an old family of Samogitian nobles. She was cousin of Józef Piłsudski, head of state of independent Poland, and sister-in-law of Stanisław Narutowicz, signatory of the Act of Independence of Lithuania. They had two children: son Vladimiras (1887–1959), an agronomer, and daughter Aleksandra (1891–1961). The marriage was not happy and they divorced in 1911. Sofija remained in Ginkūnai while Zubov moved to Medemrodė. Zubov remarried Vera Ušakova-Belskienė (1877–1941) who divorced engineer Vaclovas Bielskis. She organized courses on sewing, handicraft, and house work for local youth. She was deported to Siberia during the June deportation in 1941 and died six months later in Tenga, Altai Republic.
