= Sofija Bilevičiūtė-Zubovienė =

Polish-Lithuanian noblewoman

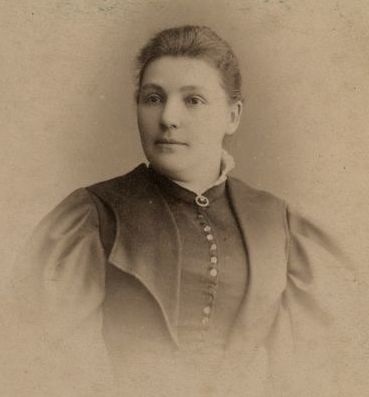
- Born: Sofija Bilevičiūtė; 15 May 1860; Kaunas, Russian Empire
- Died: 9 June 1932 (aged 72); Ginkūnai Manor, Lithuania
- Education: Bestuzhev Courses
- Spouse: Vladimir Zubov
- Children: Vladimiras Zubovas; Aleksandra Zubovaitė-Fledžinskienė

Sofija Zubovienė née Bilevičiūtė (Polish: Zofia Zubowowa; 1860–1932) was a Lithuanian noblewoman. Together with her husband, count Vladimir Zubov, she established and maintained six primary schools for children of manor workers and peasants in their estates near Šiauliai.

== Biography ==
=== Early life and education ===
Bilevičiūtė was born into the Bilevičius family (Billewicz), an old Samogitian noble family, on 15 May 1860 in Kaunas. She was the great-aunt of Józef Piłsudski, the head of state of independent Poland. During her youth, she was taught him and his siblings mathematics. Her sister was educational activist Joanna Narutowicz, whose husband Stanisław Narutowicz was signatory of the Act of Independence of Lithuania. Her father, Hipolit Billewicz (Ipolitas Bilevičius) received a degree in philosophy and published a philosophical treaty in 1901: Dumanie o Bogu i przeznaczeniu człowieka ("Wondering about God and the destiny of man"). He took her on his trips to western Europe, but she spent most of her childhood in a rural manor in present-day Tauragė District Municipality. She was educated at a private Polish school in Vilnius and the Vilnius Girls' Gymnasium. In 1880, she began her studies of natural sciences at the Bestuzhev Courses, a women's higher education institution in Saint Petersburg, becoming one of the first Lithuanian women to obtain higher education. While in Saint Petersburg, she met liberally-minded graf Vladimir Zubov and they married in 1884. They both supported Polish worker's party Proletariat.

=== Activist ===
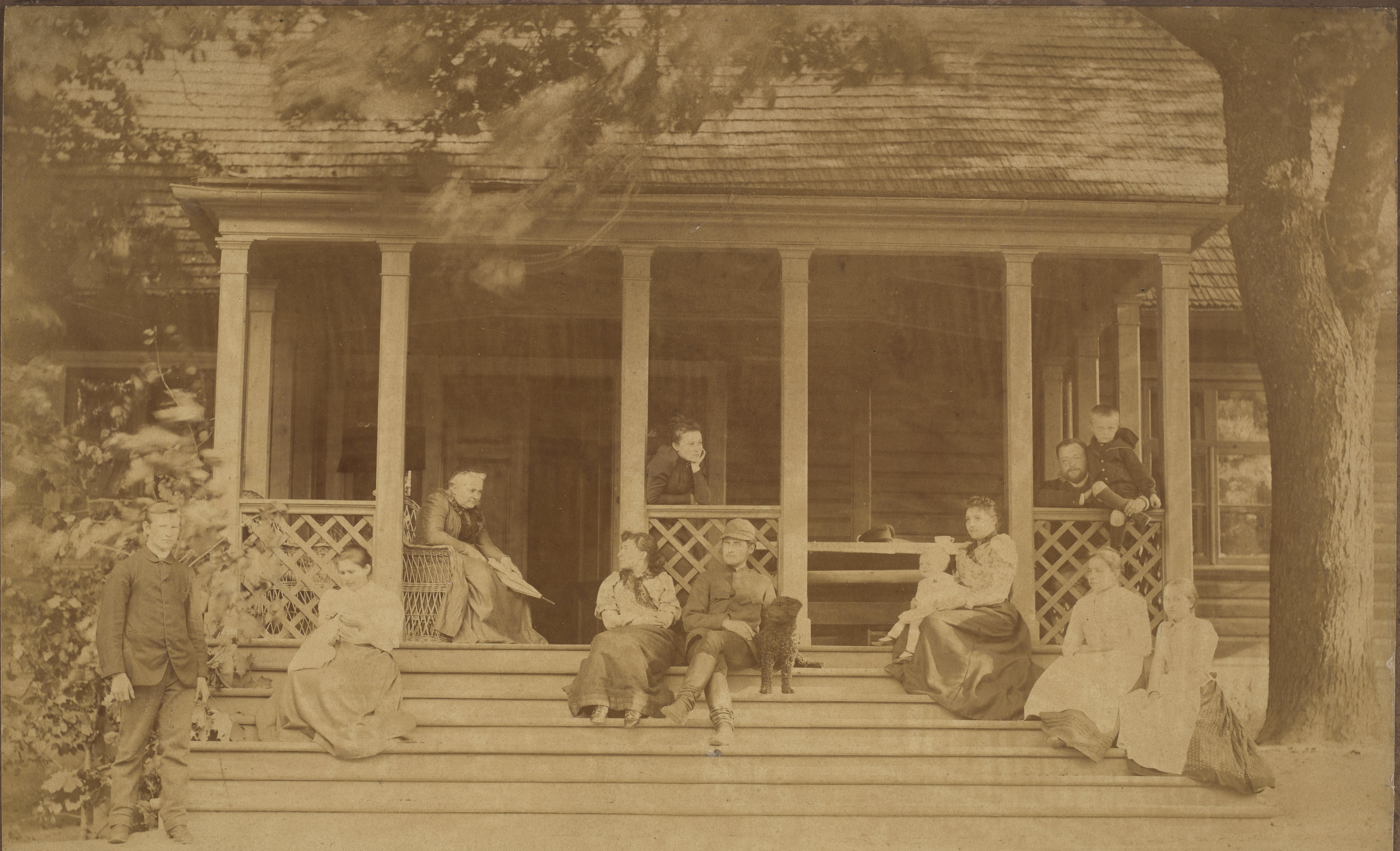
Sofija Bilevičiūtė-Zubovienė with her family on the veranda of her house in Šiauliai (in the center-right with small daughter on her knees, c. 1891)

After Zubov's studies at the University of Halle-Wittenberg, the couple returned to Lithuania and settled in Ginkūnai Manor. In a few years, Zubov transformed the neglected manor into an exemplary modern farm. He implemented various innovations and imported quality seeds, animal breeds, and farming equipment from abroad. Zubovienė was interested in pedagogy and Zubovs established and financed six primary schools around Šiauliai for children of manor workers and other peasants. Initially, due to the Lithuanian press ban, the schools operated secretly and illegally. She supervised the curriculum and made sure that the schools taught Lithuanian language, history, and geography. Zubovs invited Lithuanian teachers, including Jadvyga Juškytė, and paid them a generous salary. Occasionally, she prepared lesson plans and delivered lectures to the parents. Reportedly, Zubovs spent as much as 10,000 rubles annually on the schools.

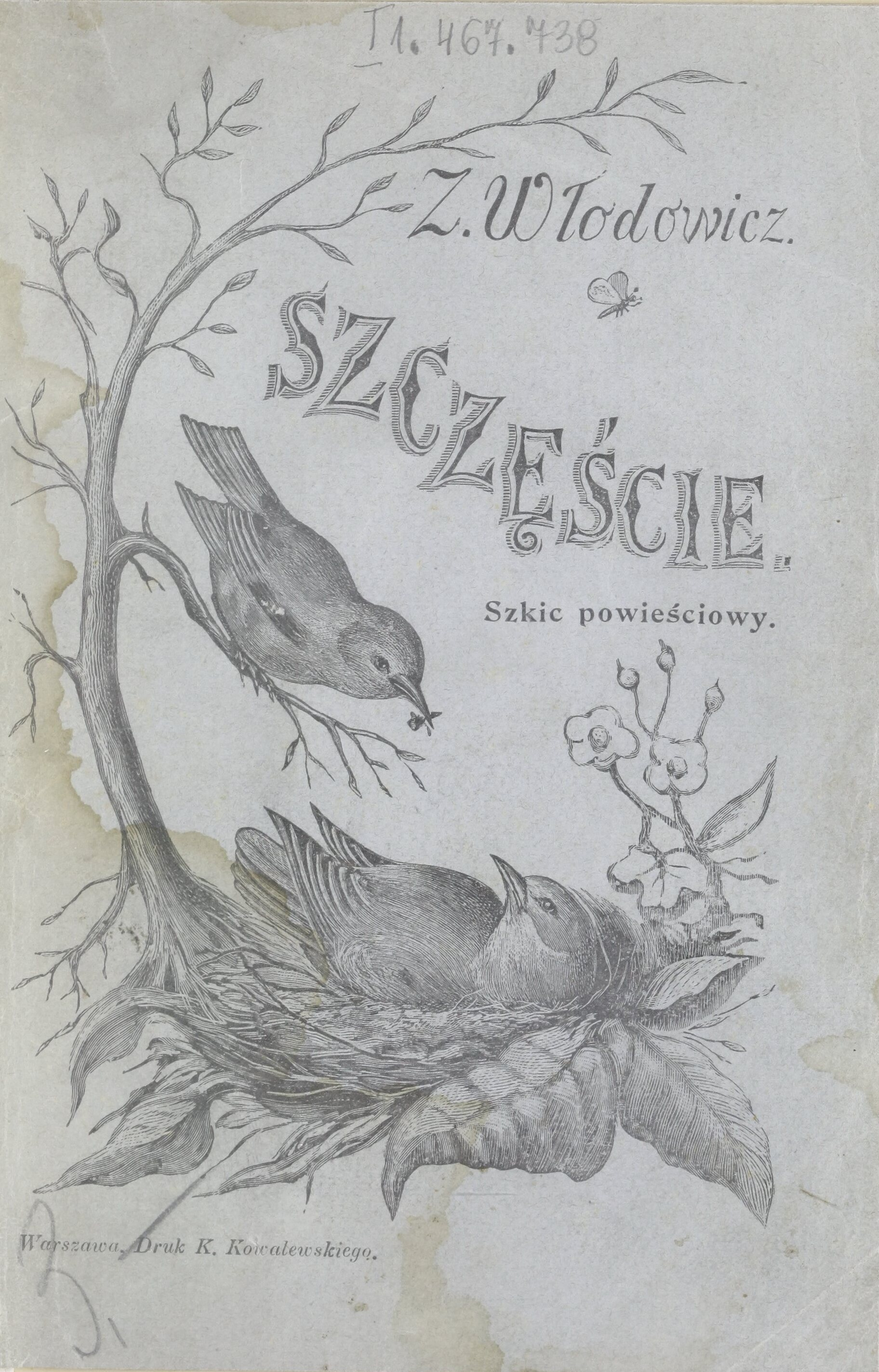
Novel Szczęście published under alias Z. Włodowicz in 1902

In 1902, Zubovienė published a novel Szczęście (Happiness) in Polish. Her husband purchased and destroyed printed copies and for a long time it was believed that no copies have survived. One surviving copy was found in a library of Zubov's descendent, translated into Lithuanian, and published in 2015. The novel was semi autobiographical. It describes a summertime visit of a guest from Warsaw. It features pleasant vacation mood and light philosophical conversations, but there is an undercurrent of tension (perhaps because the guest cannot be trusted and the hosts are engaged in the smuggling of illegal Lithuanian publications).

=== Later life and legacy ===
Zubovienė had two children: son Vladimiras (1887–1959), an agronomer, and daughter Aleksandra (1891–1961). Her marriage to Zubov was not happy and they divorced in 1911. Zubovienė remained in Ginkūnai while Zubov moved to Medemrodė. During World War I, she retreated to Russia but returned to Lithuania. She died in Ginkūnai Manor on 9 June 1932. Her friends opened a children's reading room in her honor in Šiauliai in December 1932. The primary school in Ginkūnai was renamed after Vladimir Zubov and Sofija Zubovienė in September 1933. During the Soviet era, their names were removed but were reinstated in 1989.
