= Vaclovas Bielskis =

Lithuanian activist (1870–1936)

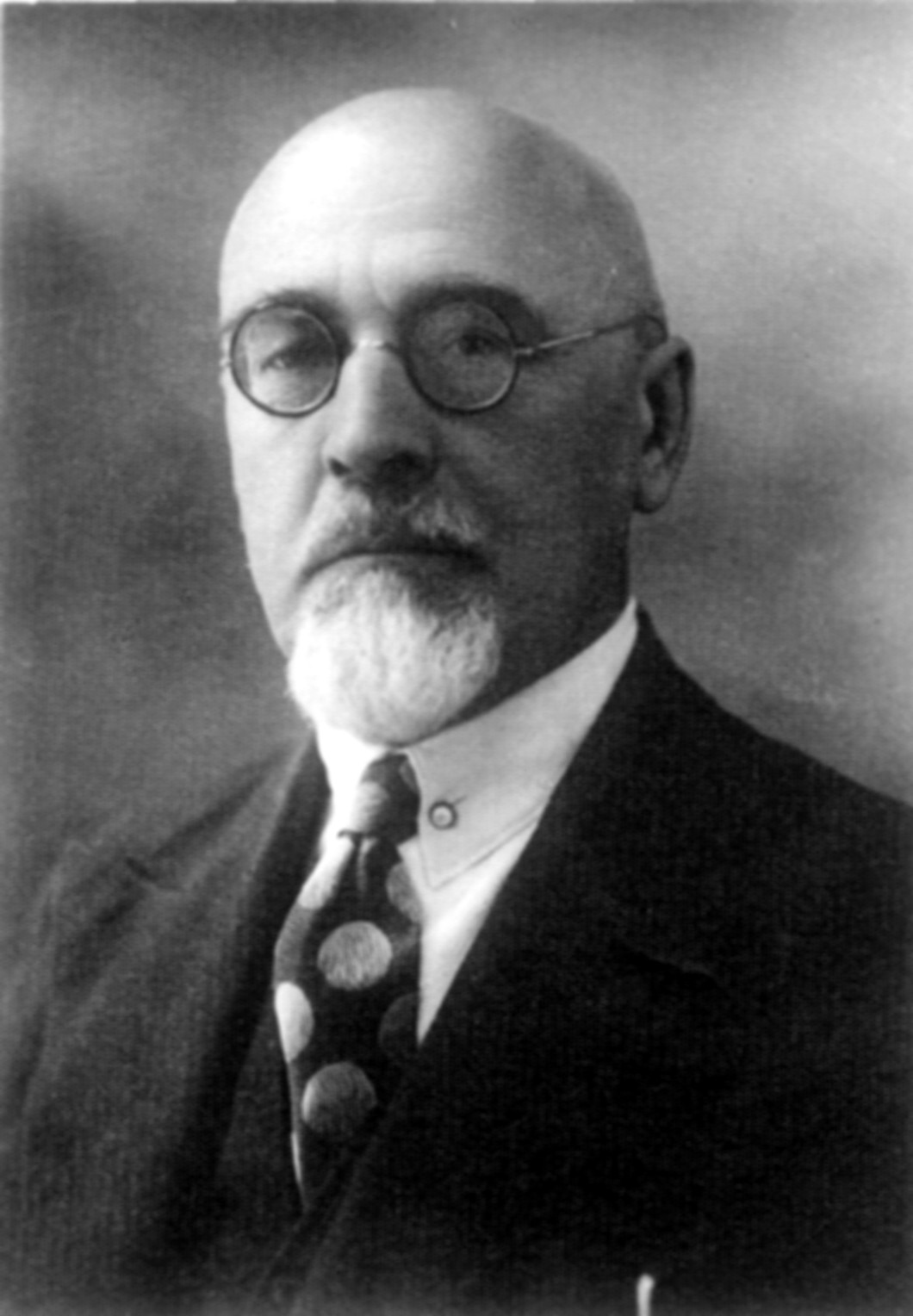
- Born: Vaclovas Bielskis; 1 May 1870; Seimeniškiai, Russian Empire
- Died: 16 September 1936 (aged 66); Warsaw, Second Polish Republic
- Education: Šiauliai Gymnasium; Saint Petersburg University; Saint Petersburg Polytechnic Institute
- Occupations: Engineer, activist
- Political party: Social Democratic Party of Lithuania

Vaclovas Bielskis (1 May 1870 – 16 September 1936) was a Lithuanian leftist activist.

Educated as an engineer at the Saint Petersburg Polytechnic Institute, Bielskis worked at a steal factory in Ukraine until he was able to return to Lithuania in 1905. He settled in Šiauliai where he became an administrator of the estates of Alexandra Zubova (mother of Vladimir Zubov). During World War I, he evacuated to Saint Petersburg where he was an active participant of the February Revolution and chairman of the Petrograd Seimas which attempted to organize a Lithuanian political center in Russia. In 1919, he was people's commissar of agriculture in the short-lived Lithuanian Soviet Socialist Republic and Socialist Soviet Republic of Lithuania and Belorussia (Litbel). In 1923, he returned to Šiauliai where he was the director of the Gubernija brewery and was elected to the city's council as a representative of the Social Democratic Party of Lithuania. He was also active in Lithuanian cultural life. He was one of the co-founders and chairmen of the Kultūra Society.

== Biography ==
=== Early life and education ===
Bielskis was born on 1 May 1870 in Seimeniškiai near Žaiginys in central Lithuania. He was the youngest of 15 children. The family owned no land but claimed descent from an old medieval noble family. His elder brother Jonas Bielskis (1855–1904) was an engineer and an activist. He participated in the smuggling of the banned Lithuanian press and maintained contacts with leftist activists, including the Zubov family. He had a formative influence on Vaclovas Bielskis.

Bielskis attended Šiauliai Gymnasium in 1880—1889 where he became interested in Marxism. He further studied at the Saint Petersburg University and Saint Petersburg Polytechnic Institute graduating in 1896. As a student, he was involved with illegal Lithuanian student societies that also included Andrius Bulota, Povilas Višinskis, Jonas Vileišis, Jonas Dobkevičius.

=== In Russian Empire ===
After graduation, he was not allowed to return to Lithuania due to the Russification policies. He worked as an engineer at a steel factory in Dnipro (then known as Yekaterinoslav), Ukraine.

Bielskis was arrested in May 1905, but received amnesty in October. Together with Kazys Grinius and Povilas Višinskis, Bielskis attended the congress of zemstvos, organized by Pyotr Dmitriyevich Dolgorukov in October 1905. In fall 1905, Bielskis moved to Šiauliai where he became an administrator of the estates of Alexandra Zubova (mother of Vladimir Zubov) and an active participant in the Lithuanian cultural life. He was an active member of the Varpas Society. During this time, Bielskis supported the Constitutional Democratic Party (Kadets).

=== World War I ===
During World War I, he evacuated to Saint Petersburg where he together with Vladimir Zubov, Gabrielius Liutkevičius, and Mykolas Januškevičius co-founded the weekly newspaper Naujoji Lietuva in 1915. Bielskis supported the Socialist Revolutionary Party (Esers). He was an active participant in the February Revolution, leading a group of revolutionaries to the State Duma. He was elected to the six-member Council of the Lithuanian Nation which organized the Petrograd Seimas (chaired by Bielskis) in June 1917. The Seimas attempted to establish a Lithuanian political center that would campaign for Lithuania's independence, but it broke down due to disagreements. In September 1917, Bielskis attended the Congress of the Enslaved Peoples of Russia.

He joined the new Soviet government and briefly worked at the Lithuanian section of the People's Commissariat for Nationalities in Moscow. His main task was to organize the return of evacuated property to Lithuania. In January 1919, he returned to Lithuania and became the people's commissar of agriculture in the short-lived Lithuanian Soviet Socialist Republic and Socialist Soviet Republic of Lithuania and Belorussia (Litbel). When Vilnius was captured by Poland in April 1919, Bielskis moved to Kaunas where the Lithuanian government was based.

=== Later life and death ===
In independent Lithuania, Bielskis worked for the Lithuanian railroad in 1919–1923 and as the director of the Gubernija brewery in 1923–1936. In addition, in 1928–1932, he headed the Šiauliai section of the National Health Insurance Fund. As a member of the Social Democratic Party of Lithuania, he was elected to the Šiauliai City Council in 1920, 1923, and 1925–1931 and for a time was its deputy chairman. As a councilmember, he worked on organizing city's water and sewer service.

He was one of the co-founders of Kultūra Society in 1927 and for a time was its chairman. It was an educational society that organized lectures, published books and journal Kultūra (Culture), established a folk high school named after Povilas Višinskis (Bielskis was one of its lecturers). He was also an active member of the Freethinkers' Society of Ethical Culture.

Bielskis died in Warsaw on 16 September 1936. Due to the bitter dispute over Vilnius Region with the Second Polish Republic, Bielskis' body had to be transported via Latvia to Lithuania. He was buried at the freethinkers' cemetery in Ginkūnai (he financially supported the cemetery's establishment).

== Personal life ==
Around 1896, in Saint Petersburg, Bielskis married Vera Ushakova (1877–1941), a Russian noble from Tver region who claimed descent from General Peter Ivelich. They met through Vincas Čepinskis who tutored his future wife Maria, a friend of Vera and a daughter of Valentin Korsh. The two couples remained close friends later in life.

Bielskis and Ushakova had two daughters. They divorced and Vera remarried Vladimir Zubov (who divorced Sofija Bilevičiūtė). Vera was deported to Siberia during the June deportation in 1941 and died six months later in Tenga, Gorno-Altai Autonomous Oblast.
