= Narutowicz =

Narutowicz is a Polish surname. Notable people with the surname include:

- Gabriel Narutowicz (1865–1922), president of Poland
- Joanna Narutowicz (1868–1948), wife of Stanislaw
- Stanisław Narutowicz (1862–1932), brother of Gabriel, Polish-Lithuanian activist
- Kazimierz Narutowicz (1904–1987), son of Stanisław and Joanna, Polish-Lithuanian activist
