= Joanna Narutowicz =

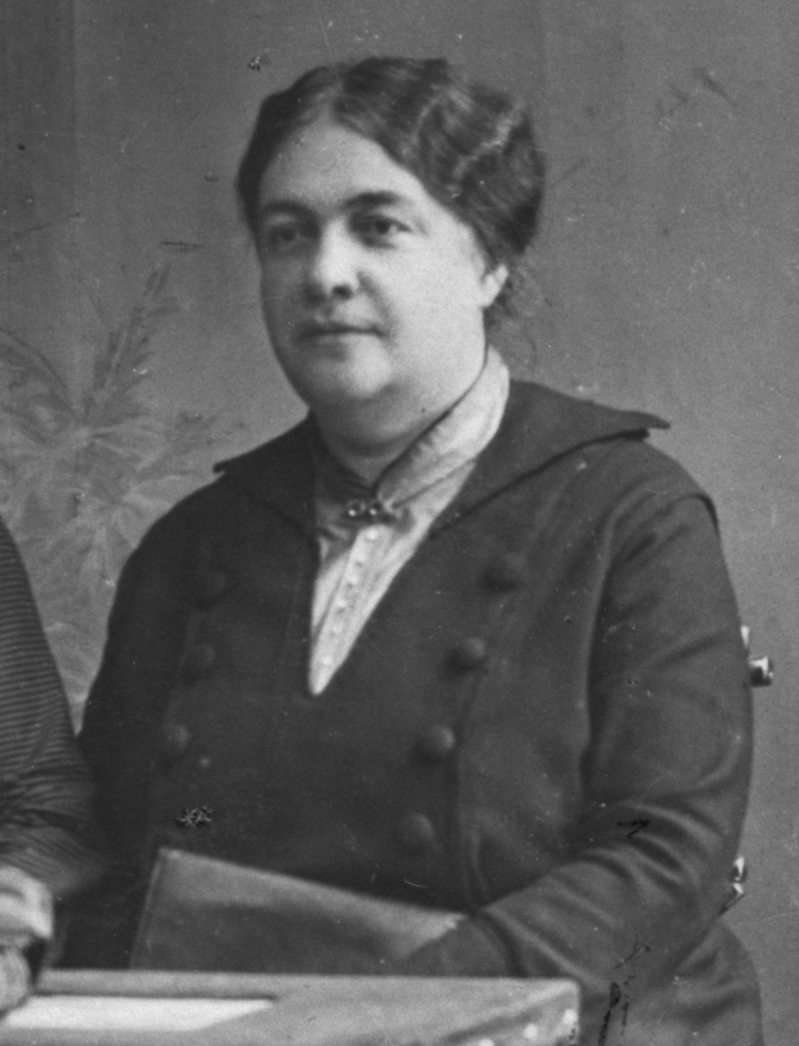
- Narutowicz in 1916
- Born: 21 March 1868; Klyšiai, Russian Empire
- Died: 19 February 1948 (aged 79); Warsaw, Polish People's Republic
- Burial place: Powązki Cemetery
- Education: University of Zurich
- Occupation: Educational activist
- Spouse: Stanisław Narutowicz
- Children: Kazimierz Narutowicz
- Relatives: Sister Sofija Bilevičiūtė-Zubovienė; Brother Konrad Billewicz; Cousin Józef Piłsudski

Joanna Narutowicz née Billewicz (Lithuanian: Joana Bilevičiūtė-Narutavičienė; 21 March 1868 – 19 February 1948) was a Polish-Lithuanian educational activist and the last owner of the Brėvikiai Manor (Lithuania). Born to the Billewicz family, she was a cousin to Poland's first chief of state Józef Piłsudski and General Leon Billewicz. She married Stanisław Narutowicz, a signatory of the Act of Independence of Lithuania, with whom she ran several cultural facilities. Notably, she headed the gymnasium for girls in Telšiai. She was also the chairperson of the last Polish gymnasium in Kaunas, Lithuania. She left the Lithuanian SSR after World War II and settled in Warsaw. She died there and was buried at Powązki Cemetery.

== Biography ==
=== Early life and education ===
Narutowicz was born in the Billewicz family, an old family of Samogitian nobility. She was a daughter of Hipolit Billewicz and Helena née Dowgird. Her siblings included educator Sofija Bilevičiūtė-Zubovienė and chemical engineer Konrad Billewicz.

She attended schools in Vilnius and Warsaw. After passing an exam, she received a certificate of arithmetic and Russian language teacher. In 1888–1890, she studied philosophy at the University of Zurich. She is sometimes identified as the first Lithuanian woman to receive higher education abroad. At the university, she became involved with radical leftist youth circles. She found herself in the circle of students gathered around the Walka Klas magazine published in Geneva by Stanisław Mendelson. The circle was called "Olympus" and was formed by young people with socialist views: Zofia Poznańska, Feliks Daszyński, Stanisława Popławska and her husband, Maria Kozłowska, Aleksander Tupalski, Gabriel Narutowicz, Barbora Burbaitė, Teodor Kodis, Aleksander Dębski and Józefa Krzyżanowska. In Switzerland, she lived with Gabriel Narutowicz (future President of Poland) and married his brother Stanisław Narutowicz in a civil ceremony in 1889 (with a religious ceremony held in Vilnius in 1890).

The couple briefly lived in Warsaw and Vilnius before moving to her husband's estate in Brėvikiai. From 1891 to 1899 and 1904 to 1907, she worked as a teacher at a folk school in Brėvikiai, where she taught peasant children in Lithuanian. In 1899–1904, she lived in Kalisz, where she set up daycare facilities for workers' children.

=== Educator ===
In 1907, she moved to Telšiai, where she established a private four-class progymnasium for girls. It was the first school of its kind in Lithuania, where Polish and Lithuanian were taught alongside Russian. She taught Polish language. In July 1908, a great fire broke out in Telšiai and burned down more than 300 buildings. The school building was not affected, but local parents suffered financial losses and could not afford to pay for their daughters' education. A local noble agreed to donate a good portion of the tuition fees, while Narutowicz covered the rest from personal funds thus saving the school. In spring 1913, the school had a total of 114 students (32 Lithuanians, 42 Jews, 32 Poles, and 8 Russians). She also worked at the boys' gymnasium co-founded by her husband in 1909 in Telšiai.

In spring 1915, during the First World War, she evacuated to Smolensk Governorate, where in Roslavl she established a girls' gymnasium. Low tuition (50 Russian rubles) attracted a large number of students. Profits from the school allowed Narutowicz to comfortably live through the war. In May 1918, she returned to Lithuania to once again teach peasant children.

In 1926, she moved to Kaunas where she worked at the Polish Educational Society Pochodnia and taught philosophy, logic, and psychology at the Polish-language Adam Mickiewicz Gymnasium in Kaunas. In 1929–1934, she was vice-rector of this gymnasium. She was also protector of the Polish female academic corporation Znicz, founded in Kaunas in 1930. For health reasons, she retired from professional work in 1935 and returned to Brėvikiai.

During the Second World War, she lived in Brėvikiai and hid two Jewish girls from the Germans. In 1945, she came to Warsaw to live with her daughter Zofia Krassowska. She died on 19 February 1948 and is buried at Powązki Cemetery.

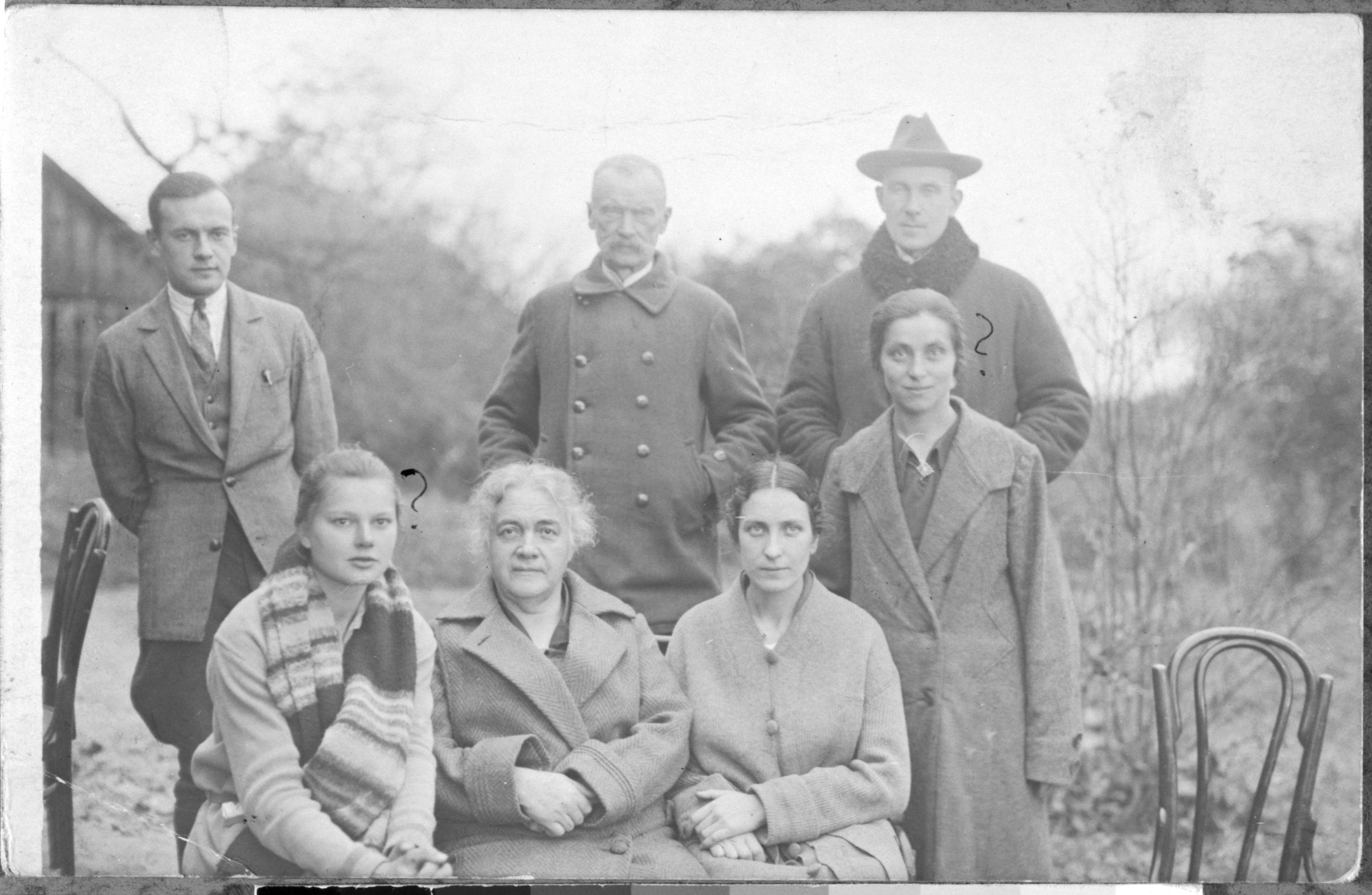
Narutowicz with her family

== Marriage and children ==
In 1889, she married Stanisław Narutowicz. They had four children:

- Zofia Gabriela Krassowska (1893–1976), psychologist
- Jan Hipolit (1896–1930), biologist
- Helena Wiktoria (1899–1942)
- Kazimierz (1904–1987)
