= Josepha Kodis =

Polish psychologist

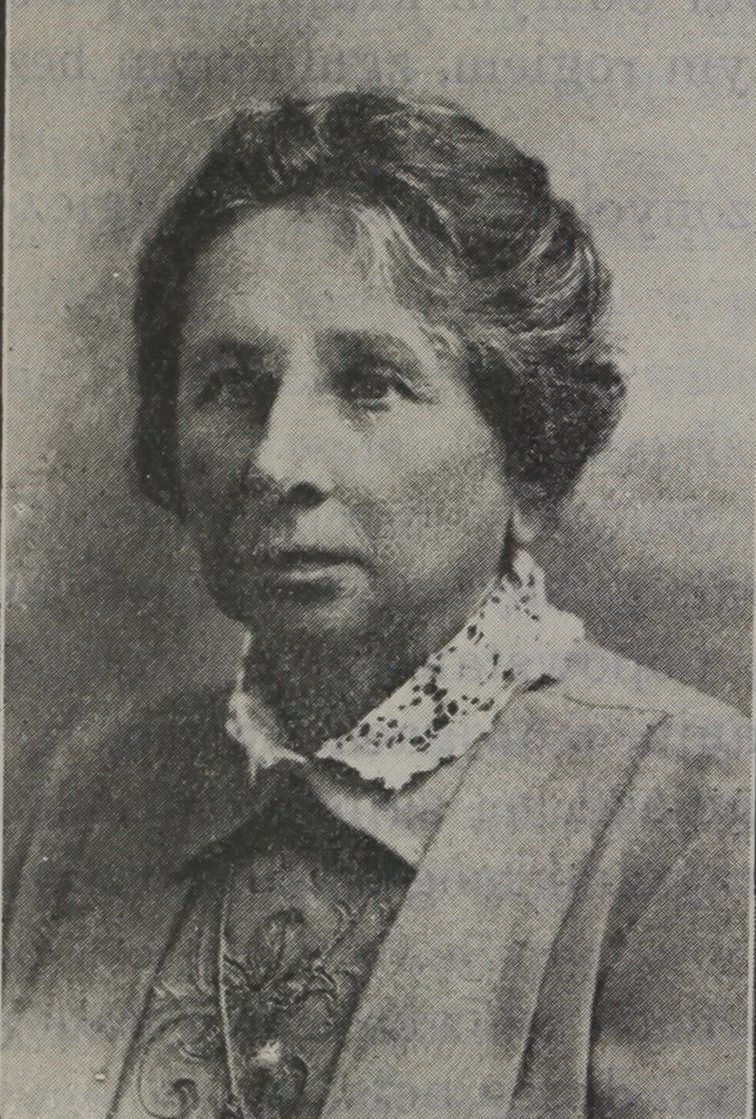
- Born: Josepha Krzyżanowska; 19 April 1865; Nowogrodek, Belarus
- Died: 30 December 1940 (aged 75); Warsaw, Poland
- Burial place: Służew New Cemetery
- Occupations: Philosopher, psychologist
- Spouse: Teodor Kodis (1861-1917)
- Children: Zofia Kodis-Freyer (1899-1992)
- Parents: Erazm Krzyżanowski (father); Zofia Kozielska (mother)

Josepha Fabianna Kodis (1865 – 1940), was a Polish philosopher, psychologist and women's rights activist, who advocated for women's emancipation and equal rights. She was a co-organizer of the People's University for Polish emigrants in the St. Louis, Missouri. In Minsk, she organized the Free Polish University and public library.

== Life and work ==
Josepha Krzyżanowska was born on 19 April 1865 on the Załucze estate in Nowogrodek west of Minsk, into a Polish landowning and clergy family in Belarus. Her parents, Erazm Krzyżanowski and Zofia Kozielska, had become impoverished as a result of the confiscation of their property after the unsuccessful November and January uprisings of 1863/1864 against the Russian Empire.

In 1881, she passed the state teacher's examination and after her father died she began to work as a private teacher in Lithuania. In 1886 she went to Geneva, Switzerland to study and a year later she moved to Zurich, to study philosophy. She received her doctorate in 1893 from Richard Avenarius in Zurich on the doctrine of "empirical criticism" or empirio-criticism as the first female doctoral student in psychology. In Zurich, she found herself in the circle of students gathered around the Walka Klas magazine published in Geneva by Stanisław Mendelson. The circle was called "Olympus" and was formed by young people with socialist views: Zofia Poznańska, Feliks Daszyński, Stanisława Popławska and her husband, Maria Kozłowska, Aleksander Tupalski, Gabriel Narutowicz, Joanna Billewicz, Teodor Kodis, Aleksander Dębski and Barbora Burbaitė.

According to the writer Gerhart Hauptmann, Josepha was the model for the 24-year-old Anna Mahr in his play Lonely People (1890). Josepha was a fellow student and friend of Gerhart's brother Carl Hauptmann (who became a writer himself). In the play, the main character, who is based on Carl Hauptmann, is alienated from his previous life and family. As a result of a visit by Anna Mahr, who is described as extremely fascinating and intellectually stimulating, Carl ultimately commits suicide.

=== Marriage ===
In 1889, Josepha Krzyżanowska married Teodor Kodis (1861-1917) who was a doctor from Lithuania and studied medicine in Leipzig, Strasbourg and Zurich. He was also an activist associated with the socialist left. In 1894 Josepha followed her husband to St. Louis, Missouri. There, she was involved in an association of Poles in America and organized a people's university for Polish immigrants. She continued her research activities and published articles in scientific journals in Europe and the United States.

=== Free Polish University ===
In 1901 she returned to her native Poland with her husband and daughter and settled again in Minsk. There she continued her scientific work and at the same time actively campaigned for the emancipation and equal rights of women. She was also involved in the pacifist movement and organized extensive educational activities for the Polish population of Minsk. From 1907 on, she taught at the Free Polish University (Wolna Wszechnica Polska). This was an underground school for the popular education of Poles in the Russian Empire until 1906. It was primarily intended for Polish women, who had been banned from entering universities in the Russian Empire since 1863.

After her husband's death in 1918, she moved to Warsaw. There she worked during the years 1919 to 1921 as a librarian in the Ministry of Public Works. From 1921 to 1930 she was an employee of the Warsaw City Council.

Josepha died in Warsaw on 30 December 1940 and was buried in the Służew New Cemetery on Wałbrzyska Street.

== Family ==
Her daughter, Zofia Kodis-Freyer (1899-1992) was a painter and weaver. Josepha's sister Ewa Krzyżanowska was the wife of the politician and first Polish President Gabriel Narutowicz.

== Selected publications ==
- Kodis, J. (1894). Zur Analyse des Apperceptionsbegriffes. Philosophical Review, 3(a).
- Kodis, J. (1896). Richard Avenarius.
- Kodis, J. (1898). Der Emfindungsbegriff auf empiriokritischer Grundlage betrachtet. Philosophical Review, 7(a).
