= Šakyna Eldership =

Eldership of Lithuania

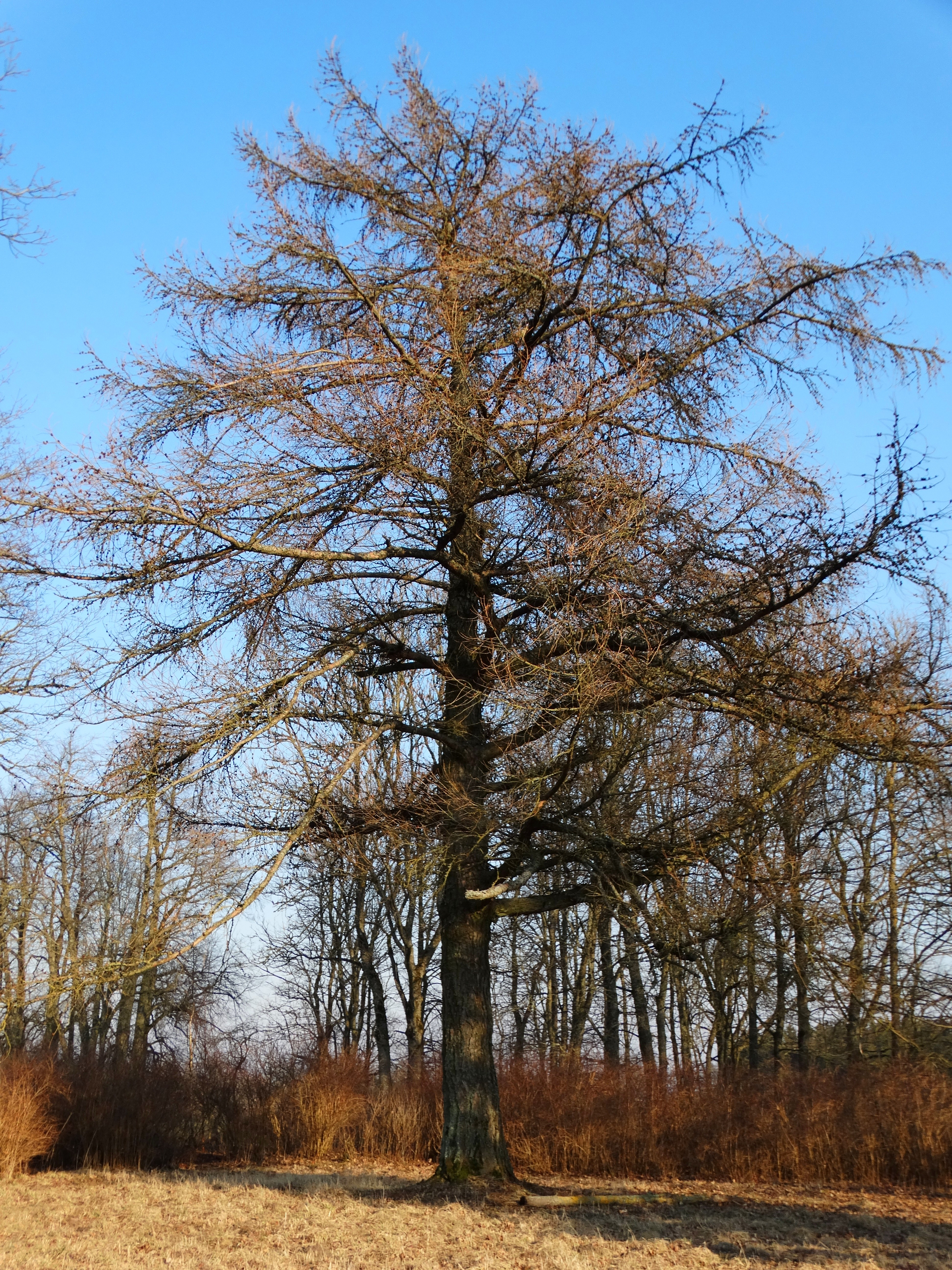
Larch tree, Riškaičiai, Šiauliai district, Lithuania

The Šakyna Eldership (Lithuanian: Šakynos seniūnija) is an eldership of Lithuania, located in the Šiauliai District Municipality. In 2021 its population was 1040.
