= Šiauliai municipality =

Šiauliai municipality can refer to either of these two municipalities in Lithuania:

- Šiauliai city municipality
- Šiauliai district municipality
