= Kužiai Eldership =

Eldership of Lithuania

The Kužiai Eldership (Lithuanian: Kužių seniūnija) is an eldership of Lithuania, located in the Šiauliai District Municipality. In 2021 its population was 3330.
