= Raudėnai Eldership =

Eldership of Lithuania

The Raudėnai Eldership (Lithuanian: Raudėnų seniūnija) is an eldership of Lithuania, located in the Šiauliai District Municipality. In 2021 its population was 1020.
