= Bubiai Eldership =

Eldership of Lithuania

The Bubiai Eldership (Lithuanian: Bubių seniūnija) is an eldership of Lithuania, located in the Šiauliai District Municipality. In 2021 its population was 3098.
