= Barbora Burbaitė-Eidukevičienė =

- Born: Barbora Burbaitė; 1867; Russian Empire
- Died: 10 May 1939 (aged 71–72); Minsk, Soviet Union
- Education: University of Zurich
- Occupation: Physician
- Spouse: Pranas Eidukevičius
- Relatives: Brothers Aleksandras Burba and Jonas Burba

Barbora Burbaitė-Eidukevičienė (1867–1939) was a Lithuanian physician. Graduating from the University of Zurich in 1892, she became the first Lithuanian woman to obtain a university degree.

As a high school student, Burbaitė became acquainted with brothers Jan and Józef Piłsudski and established contacts with the Polish Proletariat party. After obtaining a doctorate of medicine and surgery, she worked in Germany for eight years and started specializing as an ophthalmologist. In 1900, she was allowed to practice medicine in the Russian Empire and moved to Vilnius. She was active in the city's political life, supporting the Social Democratic Party of Lithuania (LSDP). In 1912, she married LSDP leader Pranas Eidukevičius, who later became a communist revolutionary. In 1919, she moved to independent Lithuania, where she was elected to the Šiauliai city council in 1921. As an official editor of the communist newspaper Darbininkų atstovas, she was arrested by the Lithuanian police and exchanged for political prisoners with the Soviet Union. She lived and worked as a doctor in Moscow and Polotsk. She was arrested during the Great Purge in 1937 and executed in 1939.

== Biography ==
=== Early life and education ===
Burbaitė's birthplace is variously reported as Mikeliškiai near Biržai or Mikoliškis near Pasvalys. Her parents were educated and affluent farmers. Two of her brothers, Aleksandras Burba and Jonas Burba, became Catholic priests and were active in Lithuanian cultural life. According to her friend from her student years Josepha Kodis, Burbaitė came from Lithuanian petty nobility, "but she told everyone she was a peasant."

With financial support from her brothers, Burbaitė attended Vilnius Girls' Gymnasium. She rented a room in a student dormitory run by Stefania Lipman, a relative of brothers Jan and Józef Piłsudskis. Their acquaintance had a lasting influence on Burbaitė's worldview. She also established contacts with the Polish Proletariat party. In March 1887, Józef Piłsudski was arrested for planning the assassination of Tsar Alexander III of Russia. According to a story later recorded by Gabrielė Petkevičaitė-Bitė, Tsarist police searched the student dormitory, but found no explosives because Burbaitė managed to smuggle it outside without detection.

=== University studies and early medical career ===
In 1887, she enrolled at the University of Zurich to study medicine. In Zurich, she found herself in the circle of students gathered around the Walka Klas magazine published in Geneva by Stanisław Mendelson. The circle was called "Olympus" and was formed by young people with socialist views: Zofia Poznańska, Feliks Daszyński, Stanisława Popławska and her husband, Maria Kozłowska, Aleksander Tupalski, Gabriel Narutowicz, Joanna Billewicz, Teodor Kodis, Aleksander Dębski and Józefa Krzyżanowska. She graduated in 1892 with a doctorate of medicine and surgery.

As women were not allowed to practice medicine in Russia, she worked in Germany and started specializing as an ophthalmologist. In 1897, the German press reported that she was to go to the court of the Shah of Iran, but this did not materialize. In 1900, after passing special exams, she was allowed to practice in Russia and returned to Vilnius. At the time, there were a total of 76 doctors in the city, including seven women. Influenced by ideas of socialists and narodniks, Burbaitė treated patients for free one day a week. She particularly cared for poor patients suffering from trachoma.

=== Social democratic and communist activities ===
Burbaitė supported the Lithuanian National Revival and was one of the first to join the Lithuanian Scientific Society in April 1907. Burbaitė had long supported social democrats. In 1899, she was briefly arrested by the police in Warsaw for transporting social democratic press. She supported the Social Democratic Party of Lithuania (LSDP). Since many people visited her medical office, activists used it for clandestine meetings. Through such activities, she met Pranas Eidukevičius, one of the LSDP leaders and a future communist revolutionary. In 1912, Eidukevičius, already ill with tuberculosis, was arrested. They married in prison. Burbaitė managed to get his three-year sentence reduced from internal exile to the Arkhangelsk Oblast to exile abroad.

In spring 1915, she co-founded Sveikata (Health), a society that aimed to improve health and sanitation as World War I increased risks of epidemics. The other co-founders were Veronika Alseikienė, Felicija Bortkevičienė, Mykolas Sleževičius, and Jonas Vileišis. However, due to the war, the society was short-lived. In September 1917, together with other women activists, she signed a letter protesting that not a single woman was invited to the Vilnius Conference. Eidukevičius returned to Vilnius in 1915. In 1918, he became chairman of the short-lived Communist Party of Lithuania and Belorussia and Vilna Soviet of Workers Deputies. Soviet literature claims that Burbaitė also joined the communist party, but there is no direct evidence to support this claim. It is known that she provided medical care and smuggled food for various political prisoners.

=== Independent Lithuania and Soviet Union ===
When Polish forces captured Vilnius in April 1919, Eidukevičius retreated to Soviet Russia while Burbaitė remained in Lithuania. She moved to Raseiniai and then to Šiauliai. In 1921, she was elected to the Šiauliai city council. She was named as the official editor of the communist newspaper Darbininkų atstovas even though she did not actually participate in its publication. She did support the newspaper financially. In April 1922, after a workers' strike in Šiauliai, the newspaper was closed and its editors, including Burbaitė, were arrested. In October 1922, she unsuccessfully ran in the parliamentary elections to the First Seimas of Lithuania as a member of the Workers' Group of Lithuania.

In April 1923, Lithuania exchanged political prisoners with the Soviet Union and Burbaitė departed to Moscow. Her husband Eidukevičius lived in Moscow, but they did not reunite. She lived in poverty working at an outpatient clinic. She left Moscow for Belarus in 1925. She settled in Polotsk and continued working as a doctor. She also continued to be involved in communist activities. In her free time, she traveled to Crimea, Caucasus, and Ural.

She was arrested during the Great Purge in 1937. In prison, she lost her eyesight. She was executed in Minsk Prison on 10 May 1939. Her burial place is unknown.
