= Šiauliai Rural Eldership =

Eldership of Lithuania

The Šiauliai Rural Eldership (Lithuanian: Šiaulių kaimiškoji seniūnija) is an eldership of Lithuania, located in the Šiauliai District Municipality. In 2021 its population was 8016.
