= Zofia Daszyńska-Golińska =

Polish politician, suffragist and professor

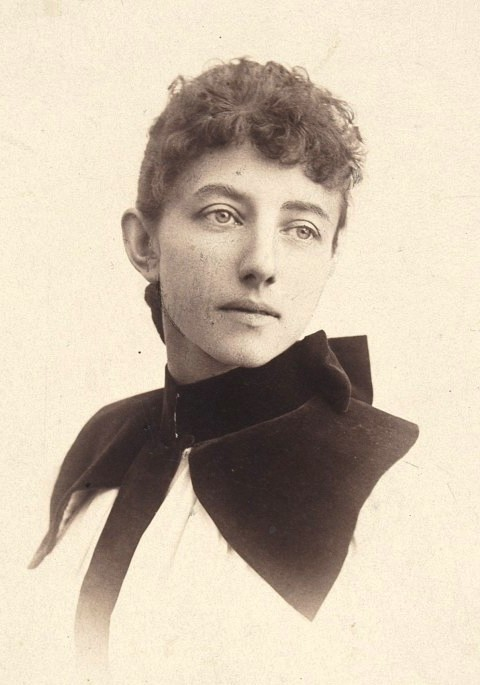
- Born: Zofia Emilia Poznańska; 6 August 1866; Warsaw, Congress Poland
- Died: 11 February 1934 (aged 67); Warsaw, Second Polish Republic

Zofia Emilia Daszyńska-Golińska or Zofia Golińska, née Zofia Poznańska (6 August 1866 – 11 February 1934) was a Polish socialist politician, suffragist and professor. She was an early female senator in Poland.

== Life ==
Daszyńska-Golińska was born in Warsaw in 1866. Her father and her mother came from educated families. She became interested in social issues and science and after studying at the Warsaw government school she went to Zurich. In Switzerland she studied philosophy, history, politics, and economics. In Zurich, she found herself in the circle of students gathered around the Walka Klas magazine published in Geneva by Stanisław Mendelson. The circle was called "Olympus" and was formed by young people with socialist views: Barbora Burbaitė, Feliks Daszyński, Stanisława Popławska and her husband, Maria Kozłowska, Aleksander Tupalski, Gabriel Narutowicz, Joanna Billewicz, Teodor Kodis, Aleksander Dębski and Józefa Krzyżanowska.

She married the political activist Felix Daszyński in Switzerland, but the marriage ended when her husband died after two years of tuberculosis. Her brother-in-law, Ignacy Daszynski, took over his brother's legacy and founded the Polish Socialist Party. He became Poland's first Prime Minister. Her second husband was a botanist named Golinski, although she remained interested in the politics she shared with her first husband. In 1891 she achieved a doctorate in demographics concerning the 18th century population of Zürich.

She then studied unofficially on the outskirts of the University of Vienna, as women could not enroll and some ideas were difficult to discuss. The institution she helped was unofficially named the Flying University. The organisation enrolled students on courses and existed from 1885 to 1907 when it achieved official recognition and became the Society for Scientific Studies. Daszyńska-Golińska taught in Berlin as an assistant Professor from 1894 to 1896, before moving to Kraków. She supported the Polish Socialist Party and wrote a number of books and published academic papers. In 1919, she became a professor at the Free Polish University. She lectured on Economics and social issues, including labour protection.

Daszyńska-Golińska was said to be more moderate than Marxist, and followed the approach of Eduard Bernstein. From 1928 to 1932 she was a member of the Polish senate, representing the BBWR party. Around this time she was a member of a number of leading feminist organisations, including the Little Entente of Women.

== Legacy ==
She died in 1934 in Warsaw. She was awarded the Officer's Cross of Polonia Restituta. She had published more than eighty books, including Breakthrough in Socialism in 1900, her two volume The Social Economy in 1906-7, Through a cooperative system for the future in 1921, Issues of population policy in 1927, and Social Policy in 1933.
