= Naisiai Manor =

Manor house in Lithuania

Coordinates: 56°1′14″N 23°31′18″E

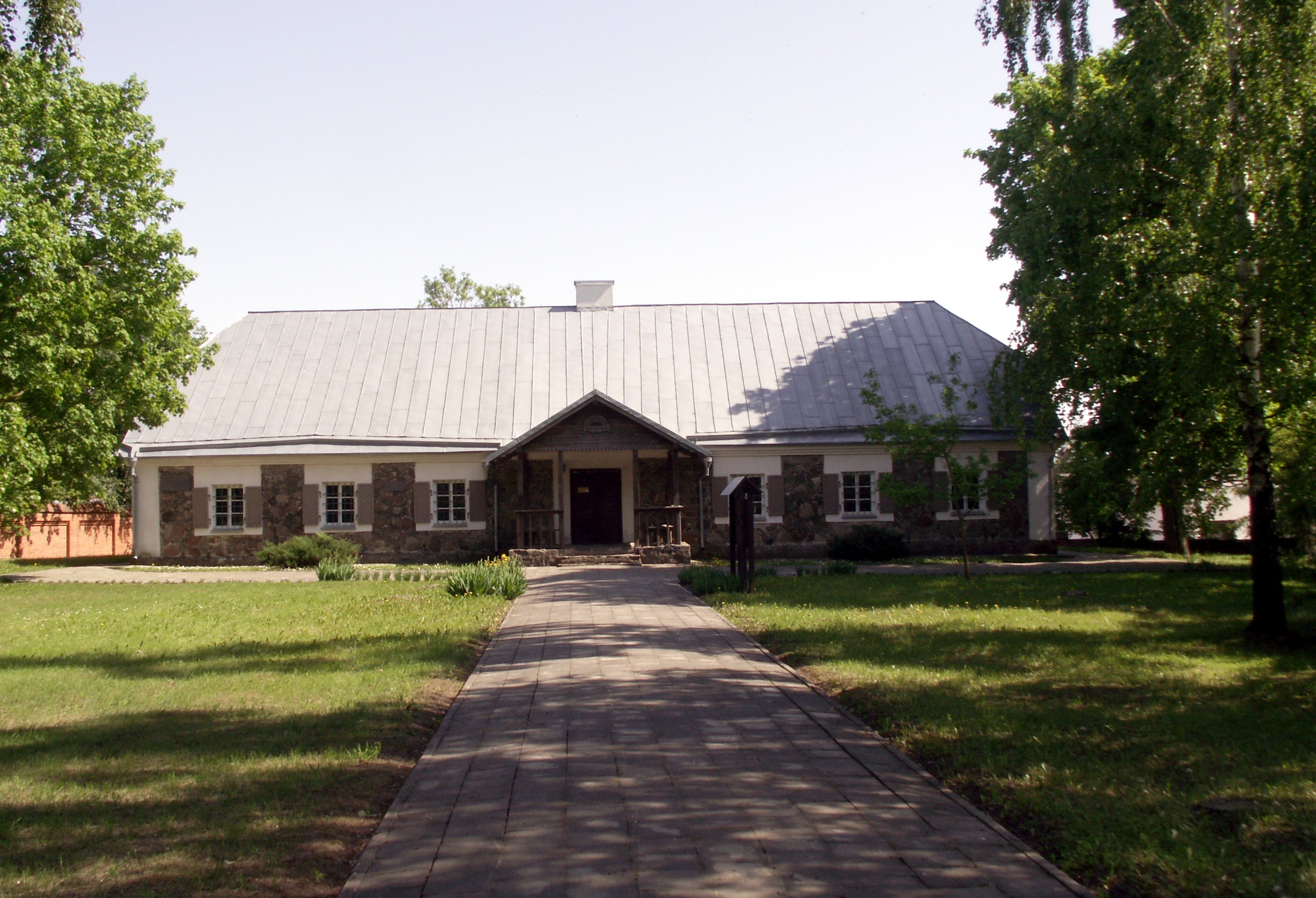
Naisiai Manor

Naisiai Manor is a former residential manor in Naisiai village, Šiauliai District Municipality, Lithuania.
