= Pranas Eidukevičius =

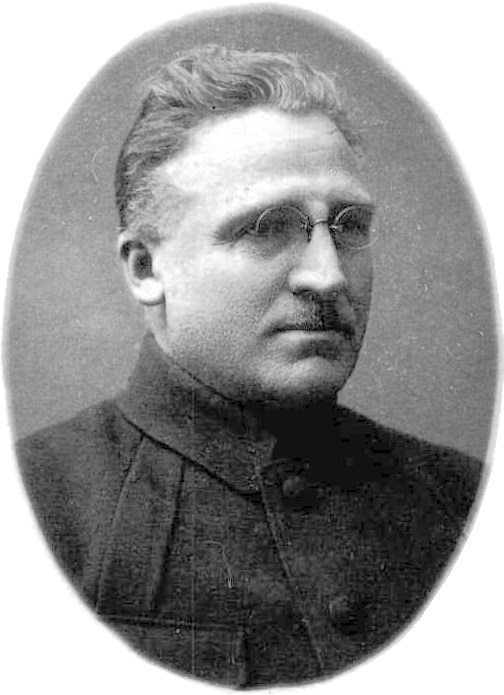
- Born: 7 October 1869; Kybartai, Suwałki Governorate, Congress Poland
- Died: 7 March 1926 (aged 56); Moscow, Soviet Union
- Burial place: Novodevichy Cemetery
- Other names: Pen names: Edmundas, Antanas Baranauskas, Marcelis, Maciejus, Butkevičius, etc.
- Political party: Social Democratic Party of Lithuania; Communist Party of Lithuania and Belorussia
- Spouse: Barbora Burbaitė-Eidukevičienė

Pranas Eidukevičius (Russian: Пранас Винцович Эйдукявичюс; 7 October 1869 – 7 March 1926) was a Lithuanian socialist activist and communist revolutionary. He was a member of the central committee of the Social Democratic Party of Lithuania in 1906–1918 and chairman of the short-lived Communist Party of Lithuania and Belorussia (1918) and Vilna Soviet of Workers Deputies (1918–1919).

Born to a family of a railroad worker, Eidukevičius received only two-year primary education. In 1885–1895, he worked at various metalworking factories in Kaunas and joined socialist ranks. In 1895, he moved to Riga and established a section of the Social Democratic Party of Lithuania (LSDP). For his socialist activities, he was arrested and exiled by the Tsarist police several times. During the Russian Revolution of 1905, he worked with the Polish Socialist Party (PPS) and took part in the Łódź insurrection. During World War I, he was arrested by Austrian and German authorities. In total, during his life, he was arrested ten times and spent about five years in prisons.

After the October Revolution, he increasingly supported Bolshevism and played a key role in establishing the Communist Party of Lithuania and Belorussia in summer 1918. In December 1918, he was elected chairman of the Vilna Soviet of Workers Deputies. After the failure of the Socialist Soviet Republic of Lithuania and Belorussia, Eidukevičius retreated to Moscow where he worked at various Soviet institutions.

== Biography ==
=== Early life ===
Eidukevičius was born on 7 October [O.S. 25 September] 1869 in Kybartai to a family of a railroad worker. He graduated from a two-year primary school in Virbalis which was the only formal education he received. After his father's death, Eidukevičius briefly worked in East Prussia before moving to Kaunas in 1885. He worked at various metalworking factories in the city and began reading socialist press, including publications of the Polish Proletariat. He started organizing workers' strikes in 1887. When he could not find permanent employment, he moved to Riga in fall 1895. In 1897, he established contacts with the Social Democratic Party of Lithuania (LSDP) and formed its section in Riga.

In November 1898, Eidukevičius was arrested with about 200 others and sentenced to three years of internal exile without the right to live in major industrial cities. He briefly lived in Hrodna and near Vawkavysk. He was arrested and imprisoned in Saint Petersburg in 1901–1902. There he studied Das Kapital by Karl Marx with other imprisoned socialists and communists. In May 1903, Eidukevičius organized a commemoration of the International Workers' Day and a strike of factory workers in Hrodna. He was again arrested and deported to the Olonets Governorate in January 1904. He escaped to Germany in October 1904.

=== Socialist activist ===
Eidukevičius returned to Russia at the end of 1904 and took active part in organizing the protests and strikes in Vilnius during the Russian Revolution of 1905. He then moved to Łódź and Dąbrowa Górnicza to organize activities of the Polish Socialist Party (PPS). In June 1905, he took part in the Łódź insurrection. However, in spring 1906 he severed his relationship with PPS and returned to Vilnius where he managed to get the local branch of PPS to join LSDP. From that point until 1918, Eidukevičius was a member of the central committee of LSDP.

Due to Tsarist repressions and arrests of prominent social democrats, activities of LSDP diminished significantly in 1909–1912. Only Eidukevičius and Mykolas Biržiška were free and more active in LSDP at this time. However, Eidukevičius was disliked by fellow LSDP members. The party had a nationalist agenda while Eidukevičius, at one point or another, had embraced Lithuanian, Latvian, Belarusian, Polish, Russian national influences. He also viewed LSDP function narrowly (advocating for workers' rights) and was described by contemporaries as arrogant, autocratic, and ambitious. The tensions within LSDP grew to the point where its members started acting independently in order to bypass Eidukevičius.

Around 1908, LSDP established contacts with the Russian Social Democratic Labour Party. From December 1908 to May 1909, a lockout and workers' strike affected leather industry in Vilnius. Eidukevičius helped organizing the strike and served as secretary of the workers' union. With a personal recommendation from Vladimir Lenin, Eidukevičius traveled to Germany to raise money for the striking workers. In late 1909, he was sent to the United States to raise funds for the workers' movement and political prisoners. He returned to Vilnius in late 1910 and organized Workers' Club. The club hosted various lectures, meetings as well as a cheap cafeteria. The club's building later served as the headquarters of the Communist Party of Lithuania and Belorussia and Vilna Soviet of Workers Deputies.

In 1910–1912, Eidukevičius organized the distribution of the socialist newspapers Zvezda and Pravda in Lithuania. In September 1912, he organized election campaign during the legislative election to the State Duma. He also represented Lithuanian social democrats at the international social democratic conference organized by Leon Trotsky in 1912.

=== Communist revolutionary ===
In late 1912, Eidukevičius was arrested for his socialist activities. At the time, he was already ill with tuberculosis. He married physician Barbora Burbaitė-Eidukevičienė in prison and she used her contacts to replace his sentence of internal exile to exile abroad for three years. In February 1913, he arrived to the United States once again raising funds for the socialists in Lithuania. He also organized a worker's strike in Philadelphia. On the way back to Europe, he spent about a month in Scotland. In June 1914, he departed toward continental Europe and was caught by the outbreak of World War I in West Galicia. Together with other Russian socialists, including Vladimir Lenin, he was arrested and imprisoned in Nowy Targ. He was freed after about four months and departed to Switzerland.

In 1915, Eidukevičius returned to Vilnius and joined leadership of various labor unions. He was chairman of the illegal Central Bureau of Unions. In September 1917, he participated in Vilnius Conference and spoke on the issues of ethnic minorities in Lithuania. After the October Revolution, he increasingly supported Bolshevism and opposed the Council of Lithuania which he viewed as a collaborator with the occupying German forces but included two leaders of LSDP. Eidukevičius and other members of LSDP who rejected the Council of Lithuania formed the Social Democratic Party of Lithuania and Belorussia in March 1918. In summer 1918, he established contacts with Vincas Mickevičius-Kapsukas and Zigmas Angarietis in Moscow and played a key role in establishing the Communist Party of Lithuania and Belorussia.

On 1–3 October 1918, during the first conference of the Communist Party of Lithuania and Belorussia, Eidukevičius was elected as its chairman. He was also the main author of resolutions adopted at this conference. Except for Eidukevičius and Roman Pilar, the newly elected Central Committee did not include any more prominent figures. The party was led from Moscow. Couple of weeks later, he traveled to Moscow to attend a conference of communist delegated from German-occupied areas. On the way back, he was arrested by Germans in Barysaw but was soon freed. On 15 December 1918, he was elected chairman of the Vilna Soviet of Workers Deputies. Even though Eidukevičius' party had 96 seats out of 202, the Soviet did not adopt a fully communist agenda and did not welcome the news of the Lithuanian Soviet Socialist Republic headed by Vincas Mickevičius-Kapsukas. Therefore, new elections were called and, by allowing soldiers of the Red Army to vote, communists ensured their control of the Vilna Soviet. Eidukevičius remained chairman of the Soviet until Polish forces captured Vilnius in April 1919. He then retreated to Minsk, Smolensk, and eventually Moscow.

=== Later life ===
From 1920, Eidukevičius lived in Moscow. He worked at the Moscow Soviet and taught at the Communist University of the National Minorities of the West. According to other sources, he worked at the Cheka (Soviet secret police) in 1919–1920 or until his death. He was elected to the Moscow Soviet in 1922 and 1923. In March 1921, he participated in the 10th Congress of the Russian Communist Party (Bolsheviks) as a delegate with advisory vote.

In 1922–1923, he was director of Kosa factory which produced scythes and other agricultural implements. In 1924, he was sent to work at a Soviet trade representative office in Egypt, but became ill on the way and was operated on in Vienna. From November 1924 to April 1925, he worked at the Executive Committee of the Communist International. However, his health deteriorated and he became bedridden. As an old revolutionary, he was granted a state pension. He died on 7 March 1926 at the Botkin Hospital and was buried at the Novodevichy Cemetery in Moscow.

== Legacy ==
In 1949, a leather and shoe factory in Vilnius was named after Eidukevičius. In 1959, his 90th birth anniversary, his bust by sculptor Napoleonas Petrulis was unveiled near the factory. After Lithuania's independence in 1990, the bust was moved to Grūtas Park.

Refrigerated fishing trawler built by the Baltija Shipbuilding Yard in 1966 was named in his memory.

== Bibliography ==
- Balkelis, Tomas (2018). War, Revolution, and Nation-making in Lithuania, 1914-1923. Oxford University Press. ISBN 978-0-19-966802-1.
- Beresnevičius, Paulius (1985–1988). "Vilniaus darbininkų klubas". In Zinkus, Jonas; et al. (eds.). Tarybų Lietuvos enciklopedija (in Lithuanian). Vol. 4. Vilnius: Vyriausioji enciklopedijų redakcija. LCCN 86232954.
- Berkhout, Amy (2011). A third alternative: the peculiar case of Grūtas sculpture park (PDF) (Undergraduate thesis). University of Bristol.
- Butkuvienė, Anelė (2007). Garsios Lietuvos moterys (in Lithuanian). Baltos lankos. ISBN 978-9955-23-065-6.
- Gimžauskas, Edmundas (2012). "Vilniečių nuostatos ir Vilniaus politinio lietuviškumo klausimas 1918 m. lapkričio– gruodžio mėn" (PDF). Lietuvos istorijos metraštis (in Lithuanian). 2. ISSN 0202-3342.
- Liekis, Šarūnas (1999). "On Jewish Participation in the Taryba in 1918". Lithuanian Historical Studies. 4 (1 Publisher: Brill): 62–82. doi:10.30965/25386565-00401004. ISSN 2538-6565.
- Sabaliūnas, Leonas (1990). Lithuanian Social Democracy in Perspective, 1893-1914. Duke University Press. ISBN 9780822310150.
- Šarmaitis, Romas (1985–1988). "Eidukevičius, Pranas". In Jonas Zinkus; et al. (eds.). Tarybų Lietuvos enciklopedija (in Lithuanian). Vol. 1. Vilnius: Vyriausioji enciklopedijų redakcija. p. 489. OCLC 20017802.
- Šarmaitis, Romas (1988). Lietuvos revoliucionieriai (PDF) (in Lithuanian). Mintis. ISBN 5-417-00071-X.
- Sukiennicki, Wiktor (1984). East Central Europe During World War I: From Foreign Domination to National Independence. East European Monographs. ISBN 978-0-88033-012-1.
