= Zubovai Palace =

Coordinates: 55°56′7″N 23°18′52″E

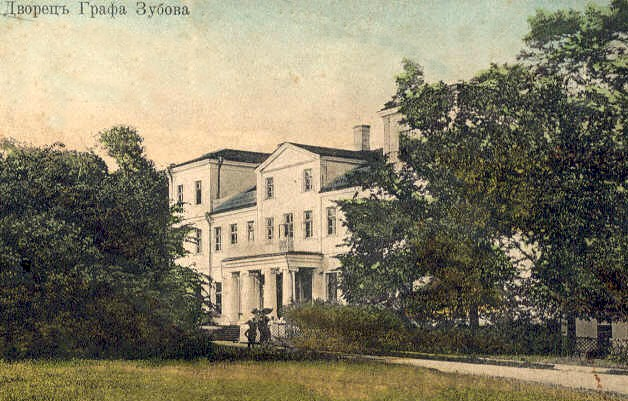
Zubovai Palace, Šiauliai

Zubovai Palace (or Didždvaris) is a former palace of Prince Platon Zubov in Šiauliai, Aušros alley 50. Currently it is occupied by the Šiauliai University Faculty of Arts.
