= Dabikinė Manor =

Coordinates: 56°14′57″N 22°47′26″E

- Dabikinės dvaras
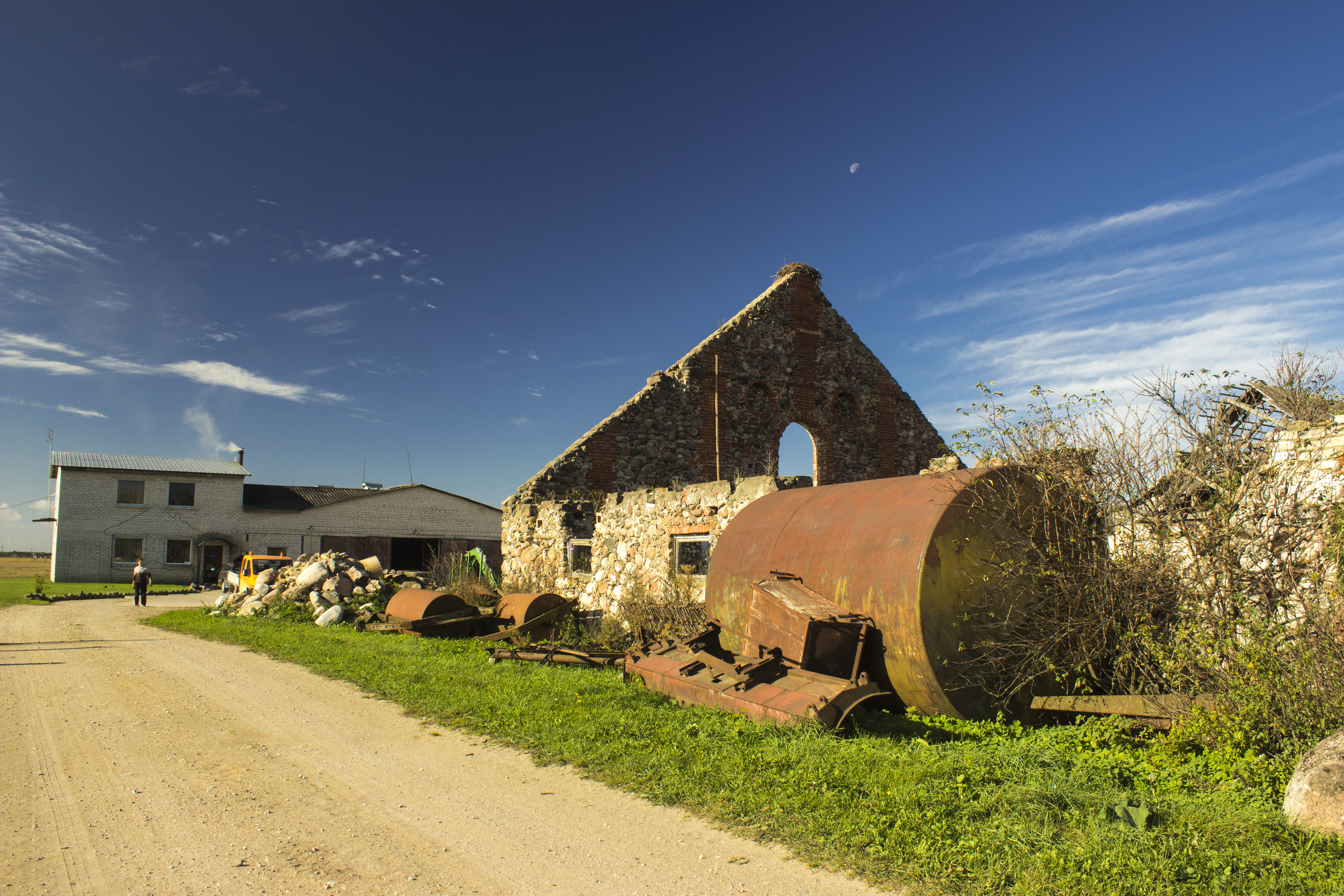
- Remnants of the manor
- Interactive map of the Dabikinė Manor area

General information
- Location: Akmenė District Municipality, Šiauliai County, Lithuania
- Year built: 16th century

Technical details
- Material: wood, stone

Dabikinė Manor is a former Zubov residential manor in Dabikinė, Akmenė District Municipality.
