= Ginkūnai Manor =

Former residential manor in Lithuania

Coordinates: 55.9533°N 23.3587°E

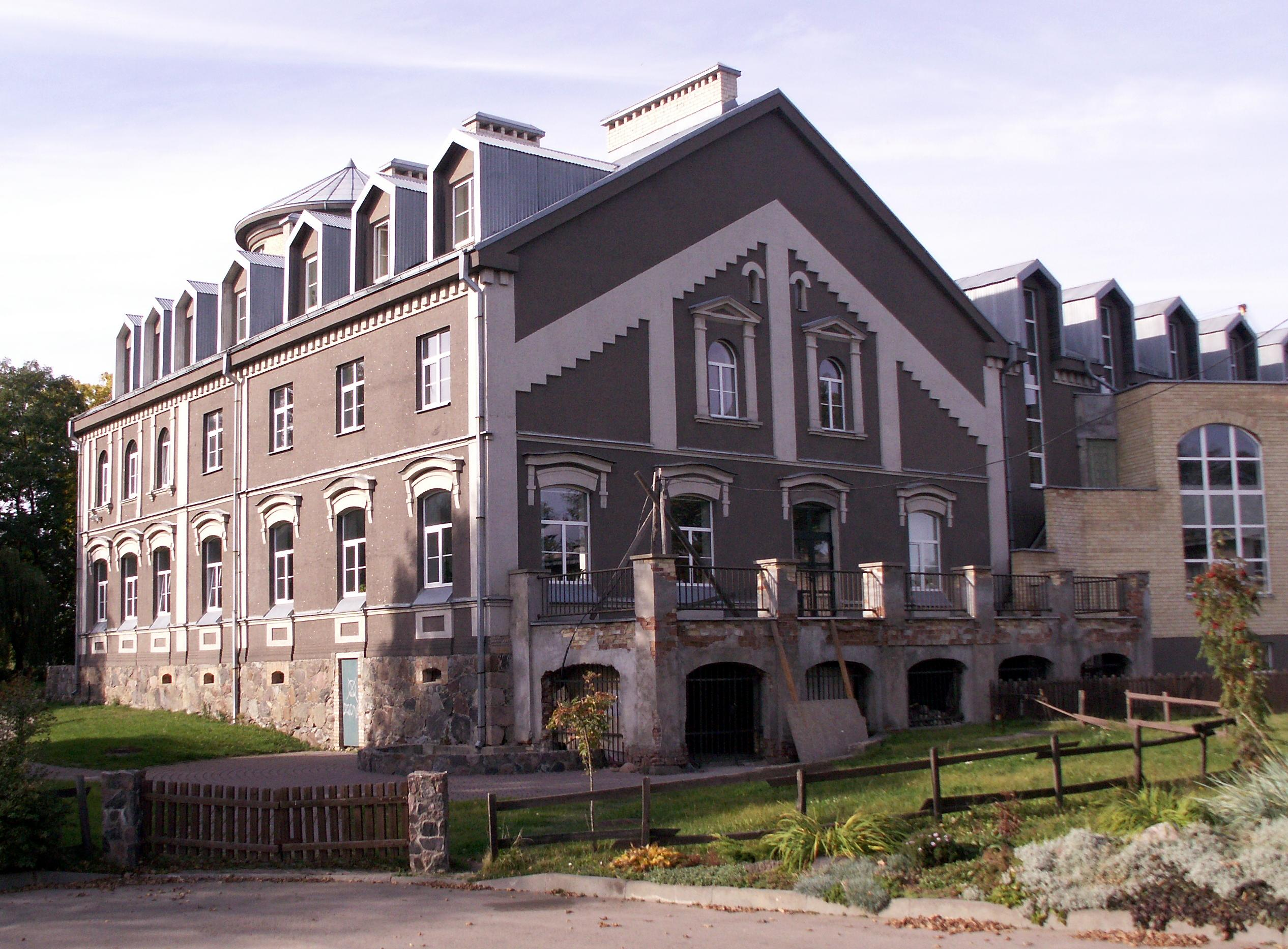
Ginkūnai Manor in 2007

Ginkūnai Manor was a former residential manor in Ginkūnai, Šiauliai District Municipality, Lithuania.
