= Ginkūnai =

- Village
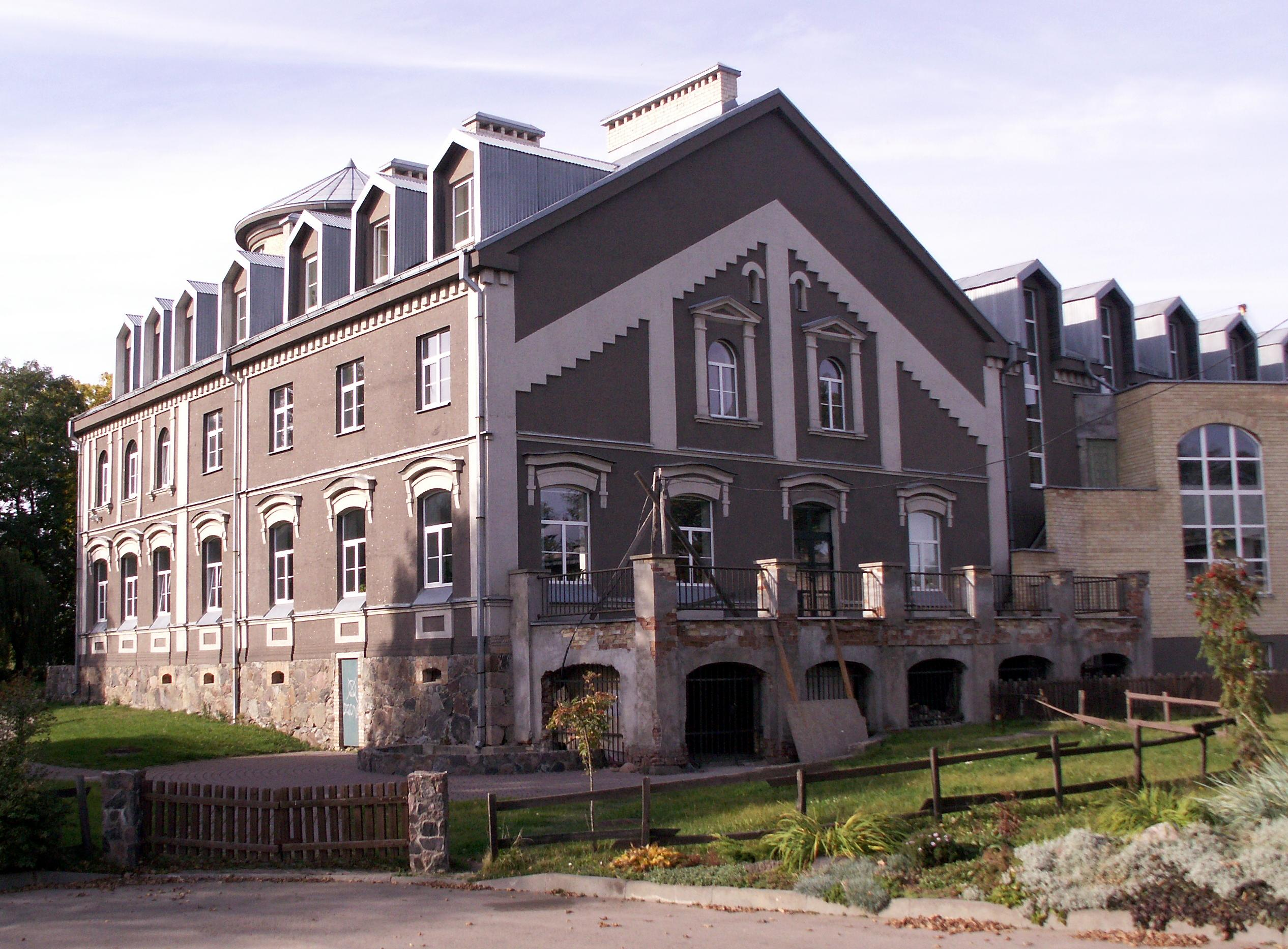
- Ginkūnai Manor

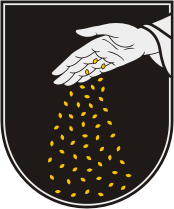
- Coat of arms

- Location of Ginkūnai
- Coordinates: 55°57′22″N 23°21′29″E
- Country: Lithuania
- County: Šiauliai County
- Municipality: Šiauliai District Municipality
- Eldership: Ginkūnai Eldership
- Capital of: Ginkūnai Eldership

Population (2021)
  - Total: 2,901
- Time zone: UTC+2 (EET)
  - Summer (DST): UTC+3 (EEST)

Ginkūnai is a village located in Šiauliai District Municipality, Šiauliai County, Lithuania. The village is located on the northeastern border of Šiauliai and the western shore of the Ginkūnai Lake (the lake is part of Šiauliai). Ginkūnai has a school, post office and library. There are also two agricultural cooperatives.

== History ==
In 1792, Catherine the Great gifted Šiauliai Economy, state land with more than 13,000 serfs, to her favorite Platon Zubov. He then purchased Ginkūnai (six peasant houses, 24 men and 18 women serfs, an inn, windmill, and permit to use the lake) for 5,600 Dutch daalders in 1805. The family established the Ginkūnai Manor, which became the administrative center of the estates around it. Zubovs supported the Lithuanian National Revival and opened a secret Lithuanian school in 1896 in violation of the Lithuanian press ban. Zubov's descendants continued to own Ginkūnai until 1940 when the property was nationalized after the Soviet occupation.

At the beginning of the 20th century, a freethinker's cemetery was established, which in 1966 became Šiauliai cemetery. During the Soviet times, the settlement became a centre of the local gardening-oriented sovkhoz.

== Population ==
1902	1923	1959	1970	1979	1985	1989	2001	2011	2021
122	162	460	1,050	1,752	2,122	2,397	2,963	2,877	2,901
