= Tenga, Altai Republic =

Tenga Теньга
- Selo
- Location within Altai Republic Location within Russia
- Coordinates: 50°50′N 85°39′E
- Country: Russia
- Region: Altai Republic
- District: Ongudaysky District
- Time zone: UTC+7:00

Tenga (Russian: Теньга; Altay: Кеҥи, Keñi) is a rural locality (a selo) and the administrative centre of Tenginskoye Rural Settlement, Ongudaysky District, the Altai Republic, Russia. The population was 611 as of 2016. There are 7 streets.

== Geography ==
Tenga is located 40 km northwest of Onguday (the district's administrative centre) by road. Shiba and Kara Koby are the nearest rural localities.
