= Kazimierz Narutowicz =

Polish-Lithuanian activist

Kazimierz Narutowicz (Lithuanian: Kazimieras Narutavičius; 1904, Brewiki, Kovno Governorate - 1987) was a Polish Lithuanian political activist. Son of Stanisław Narutowicz, in interwar Lithuania in 1934-1938 he tried to mediate between the ministries of diplomacy of Poland and Lithuania for settlement of the conflict for the city of Wilno (since 1945 Vilnius). Arrested by the Soviets after occupation of the Baltic states in 1940 during World War II and forcibly resettled to Siberia, in 1947 he was released and settled in Poland (Lithuania still being occupied by the Soviets as the Lithuanian Soviet Socialist Republic), where the communist government relegated him to work in the industrial sector.
