= Stanisław Narutowicz =

Lithuanian politician (1862–1932)

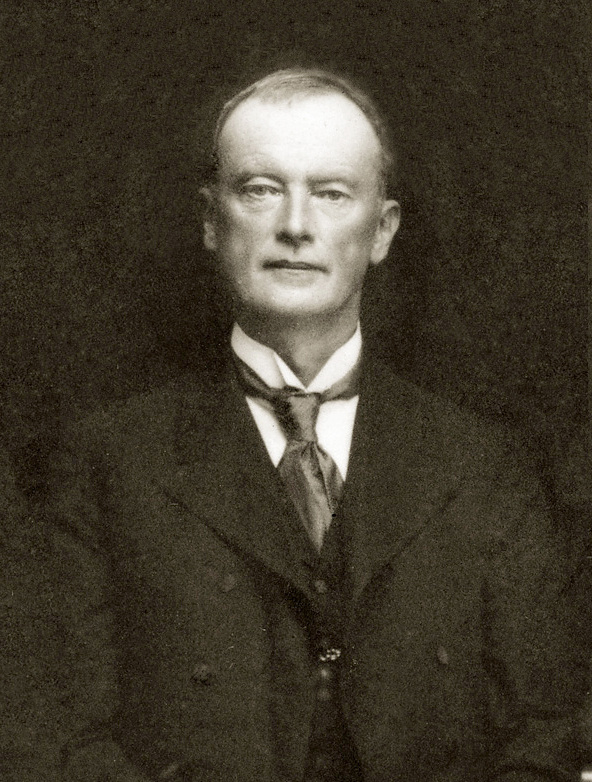
- Born: 2 September 1862; Telšiai, Russian Empire
- Died: 31 December 1932 (aged 70); Kaunas, Lithuania
- Cause of death: Suicide
- Other name: Stanislovas Narutavičius
- Education: Kiev University
- Occupations: Attorney, politician
- Known for: Signatory of the Act of Independence of Lithuania
- Spouse: Joanna Narutowicz
- Children: Kazimierz Narutowicz
- Relatives: Brother Gabriel Narutowicz

Stanisław Narutowicz or Stanislovas Narutavičius (2 September 1862 – 31 December 1932) was a Lithuanian lawyer and politician, one of the 20 signatories of the Act of Independence of Lithuania. His brother was the first president of Poland Gabriel Narutowicz.

Born into a family of Lithuanian nobility, Narutowicz studied law at Kiev University. As a student, he joined socialist groups and organised the publication of the Polish-language workers' newspaper Tygodnik Powszechny, but soon withdrew from more active political work. During the Russian Revolution of 1905, he was elected to a zemstvo (an institution of local self-government), participated in the Great Seimas of Vilnius, and was briefly arrested for his involvement in the anti-Tsarist activities in Alsėdžiai. Together with his wife Joanna, Narutowicz established a progymnasium for girls and a gymnasium for boys in Telšiai in 1907 and 1909, respectively.

In 1917, he helped organize the Vilnius Conference and was elected to the 20-member Council of Lithuania. He was the only Polish–Lithuanian member of the council. When the council adopted an act declaring independent Lithuania but in "a firm and permanent alliance" with Germany, Narutowicz and three other members of the council resigned in protest. This forced the council to reconsider and unanimously adopt the Act of Independence of Lithuania on 16 February 1918. This final Act of Independence made no political promises to Germany. Narutowicz was also staunchly against a constitutional monarchy and resigned from the Council of Lithuania when it selected Wilhelm Karl, Duke of Urach as the King of Lithuania in July 1918.

In summer 1919, the Polish Military Organisation organised a coup d'état against the government of Lithuania. Narutowicz was selected to become the Prime Minister of the new pro-Polish government. However, the coup was discovered and Narutowicz retired from public life. He returned to agricultural matters at his Brėvikiai Manor. However, he faced financial difficulties, social alienation and family troubles. He died by suicide on 31 December 1932.

== Biography ==
=== Early life and education ===
Narutowicz was born into a family of Lithuanian nobility. Their original Lithuanian surname Narutis was Polonised as Narutowicz. He was a self-declared Samogitian, Lithuanian and a Pole. He could speak the Samogitian dialect. His grandmother Anna Kossakowska acquired Brėvikiai Manor near Alsėdžiai in 1813 and brought it to the Narutowicz family as her dowry. His father, Jan Narutowicz, rented out the manor and moved to Telšiai, where he worked as a judge and where Stanisław Narutowicz was born on 2 September [O.S. 21 August] 1862. He had two older half-siblings and a younger brother Gabriel (future President of Poland). Their father joined the unit of Antanas Mackevičius during the anti-Tsarist January Uprising of 1863 and served a year in prison. He died in 1866, leaving the family in a difficult financial situation.

Narutowicz's mother, Wiktoria née Szczepkowska and her two sons were taken in by Anton Rönne, owner of the Renavas Manor. In summer 1868, Rönne hired Laurynas Ivinskis, an activist of the Lithuanian National Revival, as tutor for the children. In 1873, Szczepkowska moved to Liepāja (Libau) so that her sons could attend the German Liepāja Gymnasium. There Narutowicz became interested in liberal and socialist ideas and became good friends with Tadeusz Rechniewski. One of his teachers was Edmund Veckenstedt who encouraged his students to collect examples of Lithuanian folklore.

In 1882, Narutowicz graduated from the gymnasium and enrolled at Saint Petersburg University to study law. However, he became involved in the student anti-Tsarist movement and was expelled from the university the same year. After living for a year in Liepāja under police supervision, Narutowicz decided to continue his law studies at Kiev University. There he joined a group of revolutionary minded students, known as the Commune of Polish Socialists (Gmina Polskich Socjalistów), and became one of their leaders. The group maintained contacts with the Second Proletariat, an underground socialist-revolutionary party and the predecessor of the Polish Socialist Party. Narutowicz was supposed to help Tadeusz Rechniewski escape imprisonment. However, around 1886, Narutowicz started questioning socialist ideas and withdrew from political work.

=== Manor owner ===
Narutowicz graduated with a law degree in 1887 and moved to Warsaw, where for about a year he worked as a court clerk. Together with Ludwik Krzywicki, he decided to establish Polish-language workers' newspaper Tygodnik Powszechny edited by Wiktor Gomulicki. Narutowicz wrote very little for the newspaper, but organized its publishing matters, including obtaining financial support from Graf Vladimir Zubov and the brother of Liudvikas Janavičius. However, he quickly became disillusioned with the newspaper – encounters with Russian censors, financial difficulties and personal debts, attacks by political opponents, etc.

In 1889, Narutowicz married Joanna née Billewicz in a civil ceremony in Zürich, where Joanna studied philosophy. She was from an old family of Samogitian nobles and a cousin of Józef Piłsudski. In May 1900, they married again in a religious ceremony in Vilnius. Narutowicz's disappointment with Warsaw activists and Joanna's inability to find employment led the couple to return to Narutowicz's native Brėvikiai Manor. The manor had about 60 hectares (150 acres) of land, but renters left it in a deplorable state. Narutowicz became preoccupied with agricultural matters. The family continued to support the Lithuanian National Revival by supporting Lithuanian book smugglers and by secretly educating peasant children.

Narutowicz continued to struggle financially. To earn some money for children's education, Narutowicz moved to Kalisz where he was director of Vereinigte Gaswerke (United Gasworks) in 1899–1904. He then returned to Lithuania, where he worked as an attorney in Telšiai in 1904–1908.

=== Russian Revolution of 1905 ===
During the Russian Revolution of 1905, the Vilna Governorate-General was allowed to organize a zemstvo (an institution of local self-government) and each uezd elected one representative. Narutowicz was elected as a representative of the Telšiai Uezd. In August 1905, during the first meeting with Governor General Alexander Frese, Narutowicz objected to the inclusion of Tsarist officials in the commission and left the meeting in protest.

In preparation for the Great Seimas of Vilnius in December 1905, Narutowicz agitated residents of Alsėdžiai Volost to send representatives to the congress. He spoke at the Seimas in support of total nationalization of land, which was a radical position for a landowner. Inspired by the Seimas, residents of Alsėdžiai decided to establish their own "republic" (oust Tsarist officials, stop paying taxes, organize their own police and court, introduce the Lithuanian language at the local school, etc.). For his involvement with this "republic", Narutowicz was arrested by the Tsarist police. He was released shortly and as an attorney, he defended many others arrested for their anti-Tsarist actions during the revolution.

=== Schools in Telšiai ===
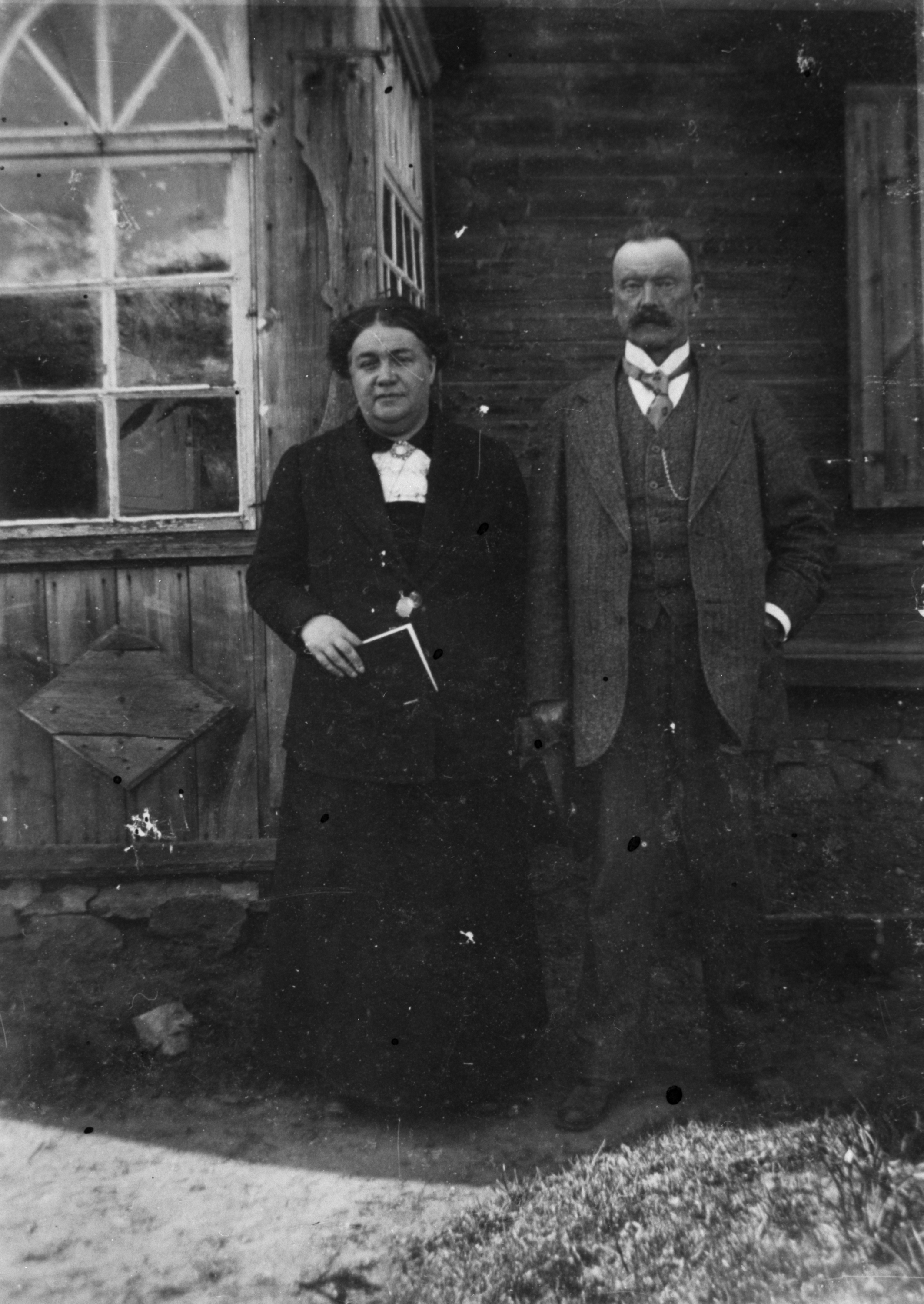
Stanisław and Joanna Narutowicz in their manor in Brėvikiai in 1912–1913

In August 1907, Narutowicz's wife, Joanna, received a permit to establish a private progymnasium for girls in Telšiai. It was the first girls' school in Lithuania to teach Polish and Lithuanian. In spring 1913, the school had a total of 114 students (32 Lithuanians, 42 Jews, 32 Poles and 8 Russians). In 1909, Narutowicz became the first chairman of a society that worked to establish a private boys' gymnasium in Telšiai (he was soon replaced by Graf Aleksander Tyszkiewicz, but remained the society's vice-chairman). The school opened in October 1909. The number of students grew from 50 in 1909 to 103 in the 1912/1913 school year. One of gymnasium students, the future writer Butkų Juzė, became severely ill with typhoid fever and pneumonia which left him paralyzed and unable to speak. Narutowicz took in Butkų Juzė and nursed him back to health.

Narutowicz joined the Lithuanian Scientific Society when it was first organized in August 1907. He was also a member of the Lithuanian Art Society. In 1912, Narutowicz was a candidate in the Russian election to the State Duma. However, priests did not want to vote for a socialist and Narutowicz lost to Antanas Juozapavičius, pastor in Varniai, who in turn lost to a candidate put forth by the nobility.

=== World War I ===
At the outbreak of World War I in 1914, Narutowicz continued to work at his manor and care for the gymnasiums in Telšiai. In spring 1915, just as the German Imperial Army pushed towards Telšiai, his wife and children hastily evacuated to Russia while he remained in Brėvikiai to look after the manor. During the German occupation, as an attorney, Narutowicz often defended local residents against the German Ober Ost officials. He even wrote a memorandum protesting oppressive and exploitative German policies. However, he also assisted German authorities. For example, he acted as a secretary and interpreter during legal proceedings and assisted with the census count of Telšiai residents in January 1916.

==== Vilnius Conference ====
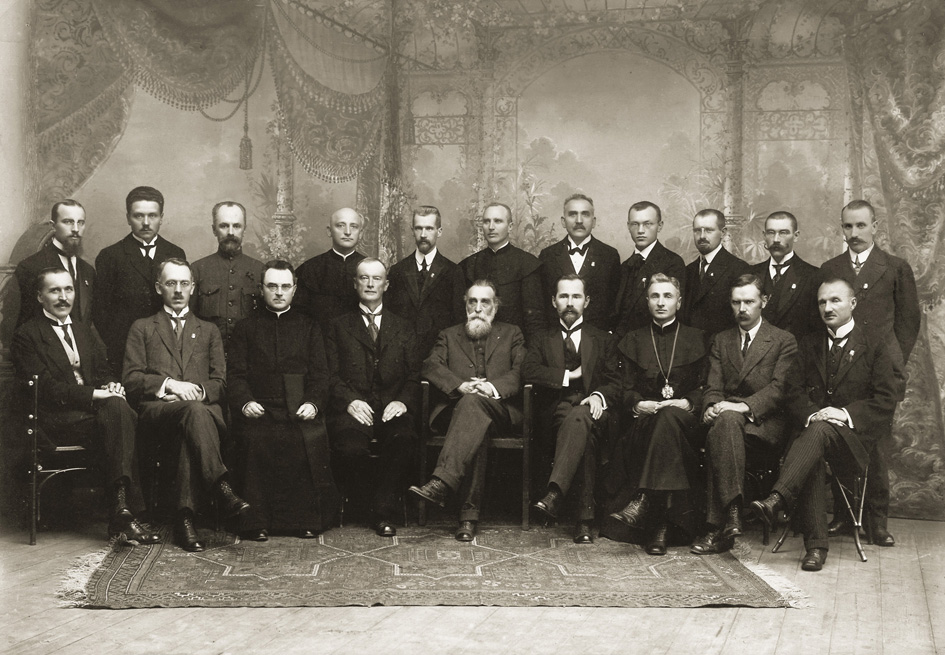
20 members of the Council of Lithuania (Narutowicz sits fourth from the left)

As German military advances stalled, German leadership rethought its strategy for occupied Lithuania. The policy of open annexation was replaced by a more subtle strategy of creating a network of formally independent states under German influence (the so-called Mitteleuropa). To that end, Germans asked Lithuanians to establish an advisory council (Vertrauensrat). Narutowicz became a member of the 21-member organising committee, which organised the Vilnius Conference, which in turn elected the Council of Lithuania. The organising committee met in Vilnius on 1–4 August 1917. Already at this meeting, Narutowicz proposed a resolution that the ultimate goal is an independent Lithuania in its ethnographic border. After these meetings, Narutowicz traveled across Samogitia agitating and selecting delegates to the Vilnius Conference, which was held on 18–22 September 1917. At the opening of the conference, Narutowicz was a member of a four-person commission to register and check the eligibility of the delegates.

The Vilnius Conference voted to elect the 20-member Council of Lithuania. Narutowicz was not initially elected (he received 94 votes for, and 108 votes against). However, the social democrats were dissatisfied with the composition of this council since it included six Roman Catholic priests and only two social democrats (Steponas Kairys and Mykolas Biržiška). When the two social democrats threatened to resign from the council, two priests (Juozas Stankevičius and Pranas Urbonavičius) agreed to resign in favor of Narutowicz and Jonas Vileišis (even thought Narutowicz did not belong to any political party). At the age of 56, Narutowicz was the second-eldest (after Jonas Basanavičius) member of the council.

==== Act of Independence of Lithuania ====
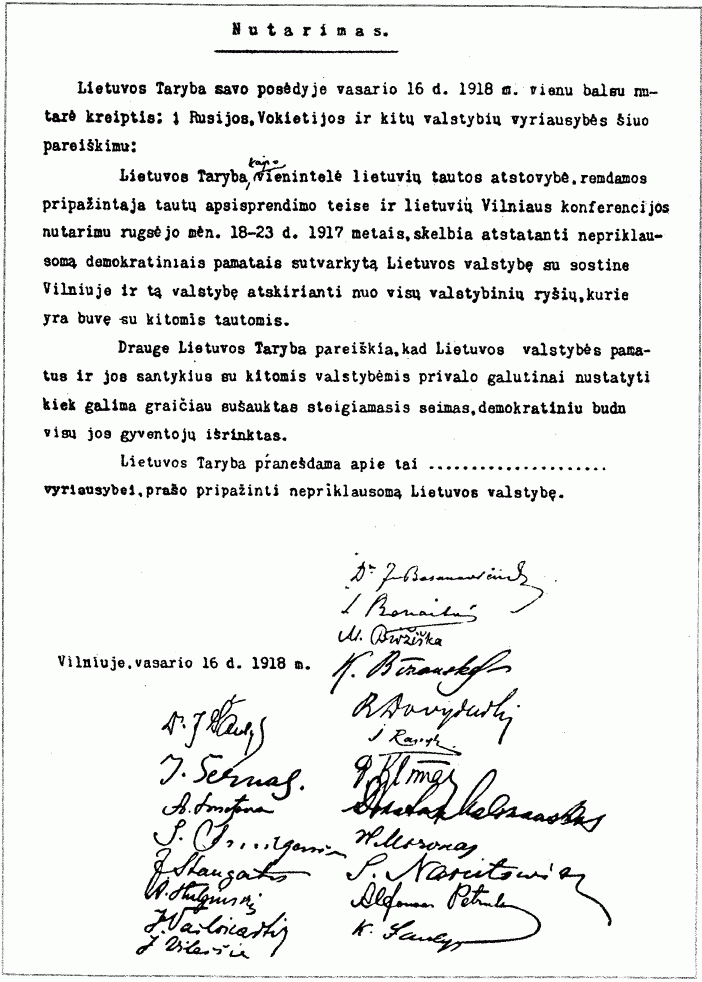
Act of Independence of Lithuania: Narutowicz's signature visible in the right column, third from the bottom

Starting with the meetings of the organising committee, Narutowicz often disagreed with Antanas Smetona, the chairman of the council and the future President of Lithuania. Disagreements with Smetona persisted and had a lasting impact on Narutowicz's political career. More fundamental disagreements were regarding Lithuania's relationship with Germany and the form of government. Narutowicz spoke against making any promises to Germany, while Smetona saw no option but to agree to the German demands and agree to the future special (albeit undefined) ties to Germany.

Narutowicz was one of the three votes against the Act of 11 December 1917, which called for "a firm and permanent alliance" with Germany. The council was dissatisfied with such concessions and drafted a new act on 8 January 1918, which in its essence was the same as the ultimate Act of Independence of Lithuania. When the Germans rejected these changes and the council attempted to revert to the Act of 11 December, the four leftist members – Narutowicz, Mykolas Biržiška, Steponas Kairys, and Jonas Vileišis – resigned from the council in protest. After heated debates, the four members agreed to return to the council, which adopted the Act of Independence on 16 February 1918. The final act dropped any concessions to Germany and returned to the democratic principles as decided at the Vilnius Conference.

==== Constitutional monarchy ====
After the Act of Independence, the issue of the relationship between Lithuania and Germany remained open. In an attempt to gain recognition of independent Lithuania from Germany, five members of the council (including Narutowicz) traveled to Berlin in March 1918. On 23 March 1918, Wilhelm II, German Emperor, recognised independent Lithuania but only on the basis of the Act of 11 December. Despite the recognition, the council could not organise the government or other state institutions due to the continued military occupation by the German troops. Even council members had to obtain German permits to travel between cities in Lithuania.

German press continued to promote the idea of a personal union between Lithuania and the Kingdom of Prussia or the Kingdom of Saxony. In an attempt to block such a union, the presidium of the council decided to establish a constitutional monarchy and select Wilhelm Karl, Duke of Urach as the King of Lithuania. From the early discussions in December 1917, Narutowicz opposed the monarchy and advocated for a democratic republic. On 11 July 1918, the council officially voted for the monarchy (13 for, 5 against, and 2 abstentions). The four leftist council members – Narutowicz, Biržiška, Kairys, and Vileišis – sent a protest letter to the council, which the council interpreted as their resignation. In October 1918, the changing political situation forced the Council of Lithuania to rescind its plans for the monarchy and the four leftist members were invited to rejoin the council, but only Vileišis agreed.

=== Coup d'état attempt ===
In May 1918, Narutowicz traveled to Roslavl to bring back his family to Brėvikiai. His eldest son Jan volunteered for the Lithuanian Army during the Lithuanian Wars of Independence. Narutowicz worked on organising local government council in Alsėdžiai. In 1919, he was elected to the regional council in Telšiai and was selected as its chairman. In early 1919, he organised local police in Telšiai. He recruited 42 volunteer policemen and organised supplies (clothing, weapons, food).

In spring and summer 1919, Narutowicz visited Vilnius and Warsaw and met with Leon Wasilewski and Józef Piłsudski (his cousin-in-law) who were organising a coup d'état against the government of Lithuania to be carried out by the Polish Military Organisation (PMO). Narutowicz agreed to participate in the coup. On 20–22 August 1919, he planned coup details with Wasilewski, Tadeusz Kasprzycki, Walery Sławek, and Jurgis Aukštuolaitis. Narutowicz was slated to become the Prime Minister of the new pro-Polish government, which would replace the cabinet of Mykolas Sleževičius. However, the coup was discovered and around 200 Polish activists were arrested. At the time, Narutowicz was in Warsaw and avoided the arrests.

=== Later life and death ===
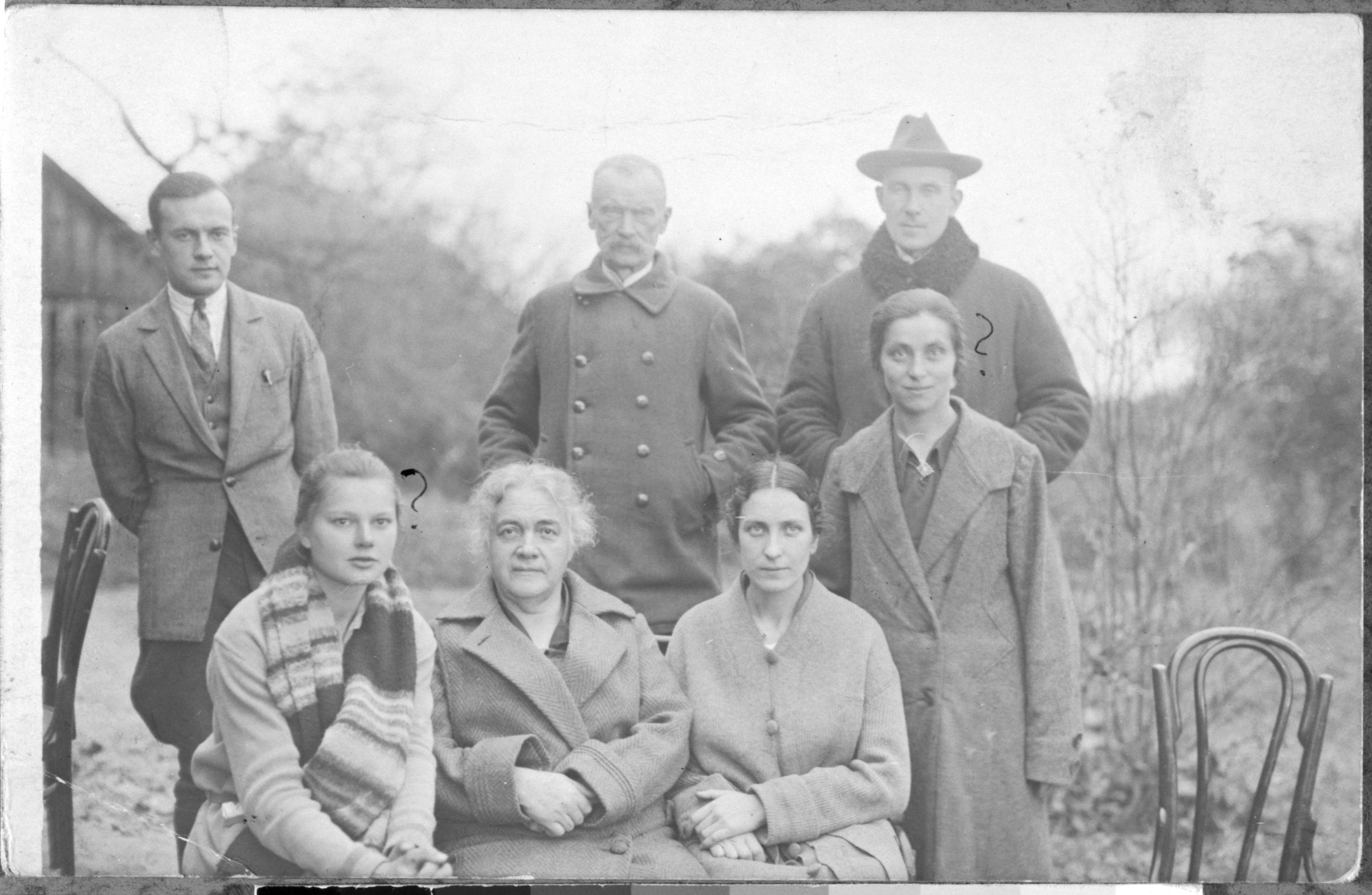
Narutowicz (standing in the middle) with his family in 1928

Narutowicz ran as an independent in the 1920 election to the Constituent Assembly of Lithuania but received only 473 votes and was not elected.

Narutowicz returned to his manor, where he established a dairy; some of its cheese and butter were exported via Liepāja. He also imported new breeds of cows, sheep and pigs from England and Holland. In 1922, he established and led a milk cooperative in Alsėdžiai. For about ten months in 1920–1921, he worked organising a district court in Kaunas, the temporary capital of Lithuania. He also worked as an attorney in Telšiai.

However, Narutowicz continued to face financial difficulties. His manor was mortgaged to a bank. In 1929, in accordance with the Land Reform of 1922, Narutowicz's land was nationalised, leaving him just 160 hectares (400 acres) – 80 ha for him and 80 ha for his son. After a complaint to President Antanas Smetona, Narutowicz was left an additional 70 ha. At the same time, he received permission to mortgage his land for the second time. On 15 August 1932, fire destroyed a barn with 200 carriages of wheat in Brėvikiai. The losses were valued at 20,000 litas while the insured value was just 3,000 litas.

Narutowicz also experienced some personal tragedies. His son Jan contracted tuberculosis in 1920 and required expensive treatments in Switzerland. Jan died on 15 June 1930. Narutowicz's daughter Helena experienced persecutory delusions. After various treatments failed, she was placed in a psychiatric hospital in Kalvarija.

Narutowicz shot himself on 31 December 1932 in Kaunas. His son Kazimierz Narutowicz quoted the suicide note in his memoirs published in 1990. The note mentioned financial hardships as well as the hostile Lithuania–Poland relations. Contemporary commentators and later historians variously attribute his suicide to alienation and exclusion from public life on both sides of the Lithuania–Poland border, family issues, and economic hardship. He was buried on 3 January 1933 in a family grave in Alsėdžiai.

== Political views ==
As a politician, Narutowicz was a mild socialist or a social-democrat. He was a supporter of independence of Lithuania rather than of restoring the old Polish–Lithuanian Commonwealth, mostly from fear that the far more populous Poland would gain the upper hand in such a union. On the other hand, he supported a loose union between the states, which made him one of the leaders of the krajowcy movement, a group of Polish Lithuanians loyal to the legacy of the Grand Duchy of Lithuania and supporting reconciliation of divided loyalties of local Poles between Poland and Lithuania. In his vision, the Polish minority in Lithuania would gain a status similar to the Walloons in Belgium: with separate culture and language, but united with Lithuanians by what he called "state patriotism".

== Bibliography ==
- Bukaitė, Vilma (22 September 2007). "Lietuvos Tarybos narys iš Žemaitijos – Stanislovas Narutavičius". Voruta (in Lithuanian). 18 (636). ISSN 1392-0677.
- Eidintas, Alfonsas; Žalys, Vytautas; Senn, Alfred Erich (1999). Tuskenis, Edvardas (ed.). Lithuania in European Politics: The Years of the First Republic, 1918-1940 (Paperback ed.). New York: St. Martin's Press. ISBN 0-312-22458-3.
- Laukytė, Nijolė (21 March 2023). "Joana Bilevičiūtė-Narutavičienė – moteris, buvusi šviesa tamsoje" (in Lithuanian). Žemaičių muziejus "Alka".
- Łossowski, Piotr (1977). "Stanisław Narutowicz". Polski Słownik Biograficzny (in Polish). Vol. 22. Wrocław: Polish Academy of Sciences.
- Kirvelis, Dobilas (2001). "Jonas Vileišis ir Vasario 16-osios Aktas". Mokslas Ir Gyvenimas (in Lithuanian). 12 (528). ISSN 0134-3084. Archived from the original on 27 September 2006.
- Misius, Kazys (2004). "Žemaičių aukštumos regiono švietimo raida XVI a.-1940 m." Acta Academiae Artium Vilnensis (in Lithuanian). 34: 255–301. ISSN 1392-0316.
- Perminas, Stasys (2009). "Žemaičių bajoras Stanislovas Narutavičius" (PDF). Žemaičių žemė (in Lithuanian). 2. ISSN 1392-2610.
- Vaitekūnas, Stasys (2012). Stanislovas Narutavičius: signataras ir jo laikai (in Lithuanian). Mokslo ir enciklopedijų leidybos centras. ISBN 9785420017135.
