= Samogitian nobility =

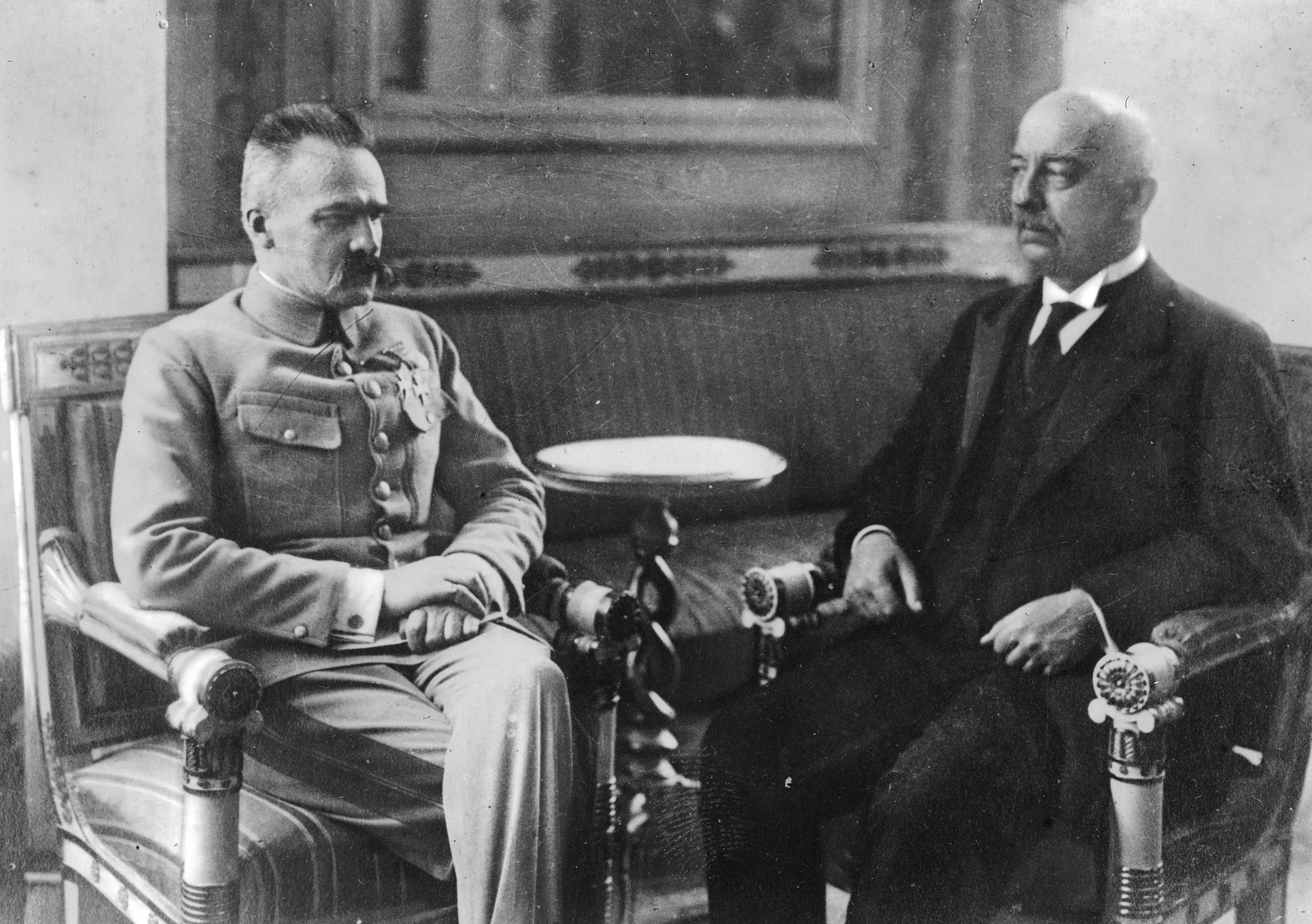
Gabriel Narutowicz and Józef Piłsudski are 20th century descendants of the Samogitian nobility

Samogitian nobility was nobility originating in the Lithuanian region of Samogitia. The Samogitian nobility was an integral part of Lithuanian nobility. Historically, the local gentry was formed of people of various ethnic backgrounds, including Lithuanian, Polish, Tartar, German and Ruthenian.

As the Duchy of Samogitia maintained a certain level of autonomy within the Polish–Lithuanian Commonwealth, its nobility was considered a separate subject of the laws, on par with the nobility of other Commonwealth lands. In the Grand Duchy of Lithuania the Samogitian nobles were electing Elders of Samogitia who had voivode rights and were the third highest ranked statesmen in the Lithuanian Council of Lords (after voivodes of Vilnius and Trakai). The self-elected Elders of Samogitia were only confirmed by the Grand Duke of Lithuania.

Samogitian nobility, especially its lower class, preserved knowledge of the Lithuanian language very well. In fact, the Lithuanian language remained dominant in Samogitia and its nobility throughout the early modern period. This is proven by the letter of Stanisław Radziwiłł to his brother Mikołaj Krzysztof Radziwiłł immediately after becoming the Elder of Samogitia that: "While learning various languages, I forgot Lithuanian, and now I see, I have to go to school again, because that language, as I see, God willing, will be needed."

Prominent Samogitian noble origin representatives from the 20th century include: Stanisław Narutowicz (member of the Council of Lithuania), Gabriel Narutowicz (the 1st President of Poland, who was assassinated) and Józef Piłsudski (the Chief of State of Poland in 1918–1922 and First Marshal of Poland from 1920).

== See also ==
- Lithuanian nobility

== Notes and references ==
In-line:

== Sources ==
- Drungila, Jonas (2019). Erelis lokio guolyje (in Lithuanian).
