= Stanisław Mendelson =

Polish socialist

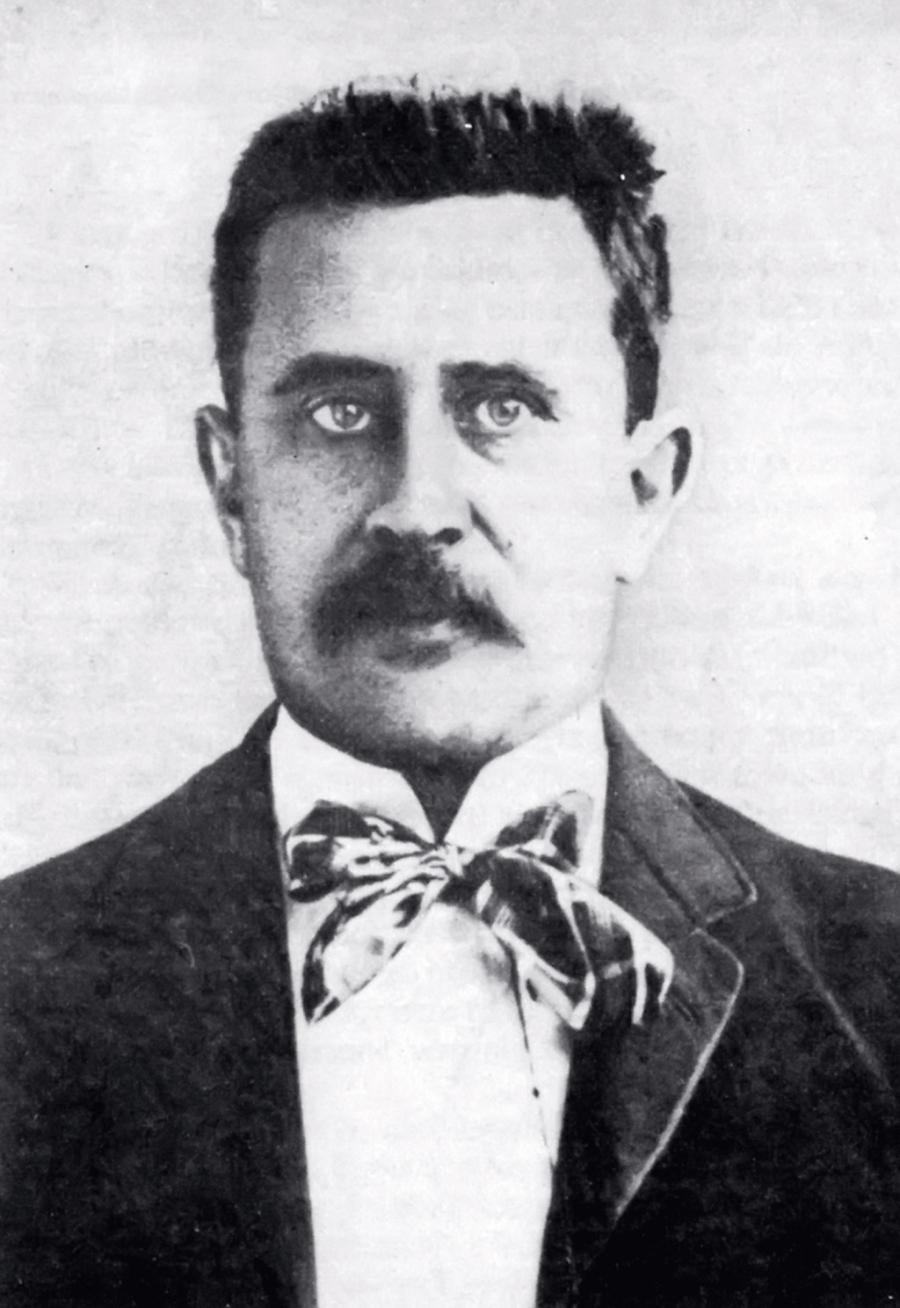
- Born: November 18, 1858; Warsaw, Congress Poland
- Died: July 25, 1913 (aged 54); Warsaw, Congress Poland
- Resting place: Warsaw Jewish Cemetery
- Other name: Salomon Naftali
- Political party: PPS
- Other political affiliations: Second Proletariat
- Spouse: Maria Mendelson

Stanisław (Salomon Naftali) Mendelson (18 November 1858 in Warsaw - 25 July 1913 in Warsaw) was a Polish socialist politician and publicist of Jewish descent. He was an activist of Polish and international workers' movement.

== Biography ==
He was one of the main activists and creators of the first programme of the Polish Socialist Party. In 1875-1878 he helped organize socialist groups in Warsaw. In 1878 Mendelson emigrated to Switzerland, and later lived in France and the United Kingdom. He was the co-founder and editor of the first Polish socialist magazines - Równość, Przedświt and Walka Klas.

In 1880 he was accused, together with other activists, in a judicial process with socialists in Kraków. In 1882-1884 he organized socialist groups in Poznań and was eventually imprisoned by Prussian authorities. Being a skilled organizer and publicist, Mendelson personally befriended many foremost European socialists - Friedrich Engels, Karl Liebknecht, Eduard Bernstein, Karl Kautsky, Paul Lafargue, Georgi Plekhanov and others.

== Works ==
- Kwestyja polska i polityka koła polskiego (1893)
- Historia ruchu komunistycznego we Francji w 1871 (1904)
