= Šiauliai District Municipality =

Coordinates: 55°59′N 23°09′E

Šiauliai District Municipality Šiaulių rajono savivaldybė
- Municipality
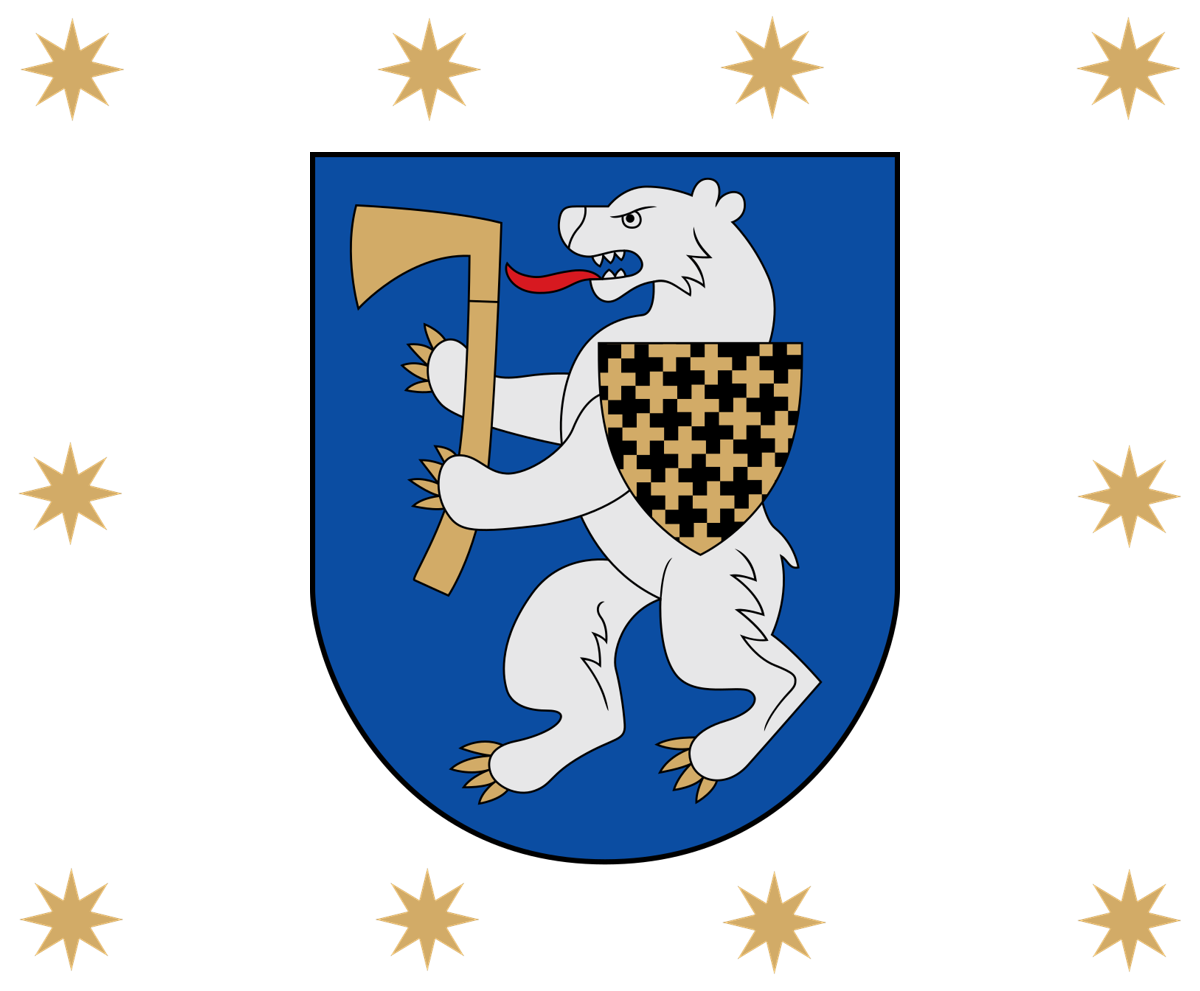
- Flag Coat of arms Brandmark
- Location of Šiauliai district municipality within Lithuania
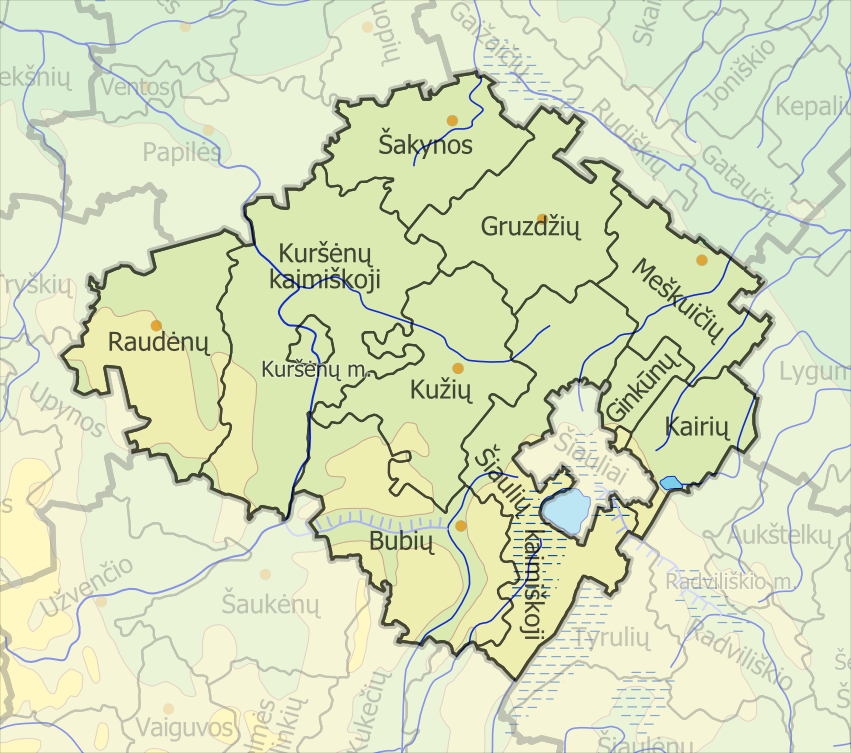
- Map of Šiauliai district municipality
- Country: Lithuania
- Ethnographic region: Samogitia / Aukštaitija
- County: Šiauliai County
- Capital: Šiauliai
- Elderships: 11

Area
  - Total: 1,807 km^{2} (698 sq mi)
  - Rank: 4-5th

Population (2021)
  - Total: 40,917
  - Rank: 17th
  - Density: 22.64/km^{2} (58.65/sq mi)
  - Rank: 33rd
- Time zone: UTC+2 (EET)
  - Summer (DST): UTC+3 (EEST)
- Telephone code: 41
- Major settlements: Kuršėnai (pop. 10,829); Ginkūnai (pop. 2,901); Vijoliai (pop. 1,065)
- Website: www.siauliuraj.lt

Šiauliai District Municipality (Lithuanian: Šiaulių rajono savivaldybė) is a municipality in northern Lithuania. It is a part of Šiauliai County and a part of two ethnographic regions of Lithuania: Samogitia and Aukštaitija.
