= Kiprijonas Nezabitauskis =

Lithuanian Roman Catholic priest and poet (1779–1837)

Kiprijonas Juozas Nezabitauskis-Zabitis (Polish: Cyprian Józef Niezabitowski, 12 September 1779 – 10 July 1837) was a Lithuanian Roman Catholic priest and poet. He was half-brother of Kajetonas Nezabitauskis. After studies at Vilnius University and Vilnius Priest Seminary, Nezabitauskis was ordained as a priest in 1803 and worked as a parish priest in Varniai and Veliuona. After the Uprising of 1831, he fled Tsarist persecutions first to East Prussia and then to France. In 1836, he became director of a school established by Polish émigrés in Nancy, France, but died just a year and half later.

In Lithuania, Nezabitauskis joined the Samogitian literary movement (an early predecessor of the Lithuanian National Revival) which supported and promoted the use of the Lithuanian language. He published a translated work on beekeeping, contributed material to a Lithuanian grammar textbook, and began working on a Lithuanian–Polish dictionary. It appears that he abandoned the dictionary after the letter K due to losing support from professor Ivan Loboiko and Count Nikolay Rumyantsev. His brother Kajetonas claimed authorship of both the dictionary and the beekeeping work. In exile, Nezabitauskis wrote a collection of 18 epic poetry works plus a modification of a ballad Birutė by Silvestras Teofilis Valiūnas. This was one of the first political and philosophical poetry works in Lithuanian. The manuscript was discovered in 1909 and first published in 1931. He also translated and published excerpts from works by Félicité de La Mennais and Adam Mickiewicz that were very popular among Polish émigrés in France.

== Biography ==
=== In Lithuania ===
Nezabitauskis was born in Baidotai near Salantai, Samogitia, Grand Duchy of Lithuania, then part of the Polish–Lithuanian Commonwealth, to a family of free peasants. Born as Zabitis, his name was Polonized as Niezabitowski (signed in Lithuanian as Nezabitowskas) to appear to be from the Lithuanian nobility. He likely purchased baptismal records from a noble and thus his date of birth is often incorrectly recorded as 1774. From 1786 to 1792, he attended Kražiai College (equivalent to secondary school) and then enrolled into Vilnius University. He studied anatomy and natural sciences. After graduating in 1796, he became a student at the Vilnius Priest Seminary where he studied for six years and Varniai Priest Seminary where he spent the 1802/1803 school year. Usually, university graduates were ordained as priests very quickly, but Nezabitauskis had to wait until 1803 – the year he turned 24, the minimum age for a priest set by the Council of Trent.

After ordination, Nezabitauskis briefly served as the administrator of Varniai parish before transferring as administrator to Jurbarkas parish. From 1806 to 1815, he was parson of Varniai, then the seat of the Diocese of Samogitia. At the same time, from 1808, he was director of the Varniai cathedral school and, from 1811, he was religious representative to the district court in Telšiai. In 1815, Nezabitauskis was reassigned to Veliuona where he was parson until 1831. He continued to be religious representative to courts first in Raseiniai and then, from 1820, in Vilnius. These duties often brought Nezabitauskis to Vilnius where he helped his younger half-brother Kajetonas Nezabitauskis cover education costs at Vilnius University. He became acquainted with a small circle of Samogitian students, including Simonas Stanevičius, who promoted the use of the Lithuanian language. In an 1824 letter, Dionizas Poška suggested establishing a committee on the Lithuanian language and, among others, suggested the Nezabitauskis brothers as its members.

=== Uprising and exile ===
During the anti-Russian Uprising of 1831, Nezabitauskis was rather passive and helped the rebels only when threatened. Nevertheless, Russian police decided to confiscate all the property of Nezabitauskis in May 1832 and, fearing an imminent arrest, he fled to Schmalleningken (Smalininkai), then in East Prussia. He wrote letters to Yuri Alekseevich Dolgorukov, governor of Vilnius, Bishop Juozapas Arnulfas Giedraitis, and even Frederick William III of Prussia asking for support and clemency. However, a Russian military court sentenced him to death on 28 April 1834 – mostly because he fled. His name was added to a list of those whose sentences could be commuted if they voluntarily turned themselves in. Nezabitauskis traveled to Strasbourg where he lived on money received from sympathetic priests who remained in Lithuania. In 1844, three priests were sentenced to exile in Kaluga and Ryazan for providing money to Nezabitauskis.

In 1835, Nezabitauskis received an invitation to become director of a school established by Polish émigrés in Nancy, France (see also: Great Emigration). He arrived in January 1836 and worked as director, chaplain, teacher of religion, morality, history, and arithmetic. After five weeks of illness, he died in July 1837.

== Works ==
=== In Lithuania ===
Nezabitauskis wrote supporting material to a Polish–Lithuanian grammar for school students written by Aleksandras Butkevičius in 1823. The material took three printing sheets out of 27 total sheets (168 pages in quarto). The grammar received some 700 pre-orders and was read by a number of professors of Vilnius University, however the manuscript was not approved by the Tsarist censors and was lost. Therefore, the content of Nezabitauskis' additions is unknown.

In 1823, he translated and published a 75-page booklet on beekeeping from a Polish work by Jan Krzysztof Kluk. The work was dedicated to Count Nikolay Rumyantsev. His brother Kajetonas claimed authorship of this work. It included a quatrain translated by Dionizas Poška that was also included in Kajetonas' primer.

Sometime before 1823, Nezabitauskis began working on a Lithuanian–Polish dictionary and collected about 18,000 words. Via professor Ivan Loboiko, he hoped to receive financial support from Count Nikolay Rumyantsev. Loboiko initially supported the effort, but became disappointed with the rather poor lexicographic quality of Nezabitauskis' work and switched his support to Dionizas Poška who worked on a similar dictionary. It appears that Nezabitauskis abandoned his work (he got up to the letter K) and the manuscript was lost in Warsaw during World War II. His half-brother Kajetonas Nezabitauskis in letters to professor Michał Wiszniewski and Simonas Daukantas claimed authorship of the dictionary. While this claim has been rebuked by literary historians, it is still sometimes repeated.

=== In exile ===
Nezabitauskis is considered to be one of the first political and philosophical poets in Lithuanian, even if his poetry is not strong. In 1835, he prepared a collection of poetry entitled Eiliavimas liežuvyje lietuviškai-žemaitiškam (Poetry in the Tongue of Lithuanian-Samogitian). The collection, dedicated to Adam Mickiewicz, included 19 epic works, including historical descriptions, fight marches, and elegies. The only non-original work was a slightly modified version of the ballad Birutė by Silvestras Teofilis Valiūnas. The unpublished 88-page manuscript was discovered by Juozas Gabrys at the Polish Library in Paris in 1909 and was first published in 1931. The poems reflect Nezabitauskis' nostalgia for the homeland and grief for its lost independence, disappointment in world order (including some complaints to God) and a rebellious attitude calling for the liberation of Poland–Lithuania.

Though undated and unsigned, researchers believe that around 1835–1836 he translated and published two small booklets with excerpts from Paroles d'un croyant (Words of a Believer) by Félicité de La Mennais and Modlitwa pielgrzyma (Prayers of Pilgrimage) and Litania pielgrzymska (Litany of Pilgrimage) by Adam Mickiewicz. These works were very popular among Polish émigrés in France. He did not use the original French work by de Lamennais, but a Polish translation by Aleksander Jełowicki.
