= Jurgis Pliateris =

Lithuanian scholar and linguist (1810–1836)

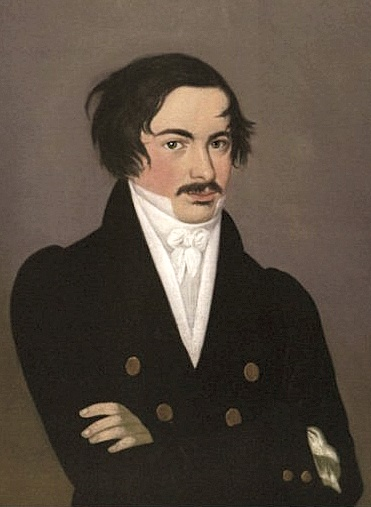
- Born: Jurgis Jonas Vincentas Broel Pliateris; 15 July 1810; Memel (Klaipėda), East Prussia
- Died: 5 February 1836 (aged 25); Raseiniai, Russian Empire
- Buried: Švėkšna
- Noble family: Plater
- Spouse: Natalia Mikszewicz
- Father: Jerzy Plater (1780–1825)
- Mother: Karolina Giedroyć (1770–1820)

Graf Jurgis Konstantinas Broel Pliateris (Polish: Jerzy Konstanty Broel-Plater; 1810–1836) was a bibliographer and researcher of the Lithuanian language and literature. He was an activist of the early stages of the Lithuanian National Revival.

A member of the nobility, Pliateris received his liberal arts and literature education at Vilnius University. He visited various archives, including those in Königsberg, East Prussia, researching Lithuanian language and literature. He collaborated with several researchers, including Simonas Stanevičius whom he employed as his secretary and librarian and professor Ludwig Rhesa. Pliateris wrote several studies, but many were unfinished and none were published due to his early death. His key surviving work in an unfinished bibliographical study of Lithuanian books published to date. He also collected various historical artifacts and amassed a personal library of about 3,000 volumes. It included some old and rare books and manuscripts, but many items were lost and remaining few were dispersed among various libraries and collections.

== Biography ==
Pliateris was a member of the noble Plater family, originally from Westphalia. His parents were count Jerzy Plater (1780–1825) and duchess Karolina née Giedroyć (1770–1820). His mother, a relative of Bishop Juozapas Arnulfas Giedraitis, was from the Giedroyć family. The family had thirteen children (six sons and seven daughters). Ten children survived to adulthood and all sons received university education. A copy of his baptismal record located in 2012 recorded his full given name as Jurgis Jonas Vincentas, not as Jurgis Konstantinas which is cited in literature about him. The baptismal record also revealed that Pliateris was born in Memel (Klaipėda) which was then part of East Prussia and not in his family's estate in or near Švėkšna as previously assumed. Likely, the family searched for better medical care in Memel.

He received basic education from tutors in the family estate at Švėkšna Manor. In 1820, he enrolled in the Kražiai College where Simonas Stanevičius became his teacher. A year later he transferred to the Vilnius Gymnasium and graduated in 1825. He then studied literature and liberal arts at Vilnius University. His professors included Joachim Lelewel and Aleksander Bohatkiewicz. Graduating in 1828 at only 18 years of age, he started independent research on the Lithuanian language and literature. Pliateris inherited about 3,400 hectares (8,400 acres) of land with a manor in Gedminaičiai from his parents and started organizing his library there. He hired Stanevičius as his secretary and librarian. Around 1834, Pliateris was elected as the local Marshal of Nobility and moved to Raseiniai. He supported education of the peasants and planned to establish schools that would teach according to the method developed by Joseph Lancaster. Pliateris distributed some prayer books and other books on religion and morality to the villagers. However, he died suddenly on 5 February [O.S. 24 January] 1836 and was buried in Švėkšna. His tomb was added to the Cultural Heritage Registry in 1993.

Pliateris married Natalija Mikševičiūtė (Natalia Mikszewicz) from Upytė and they had one son Teodoras born just three months before Pliateris' death. As a young man, Teodoras fell off a horse, hit his head, and became mentally disabled requiring assistance until his death at the age of 66.

== Research ==
Pliateris collaborated with Dionizas Poška, Simonas Daukantas, Jurgis Pabrėža. He studied libraries and archives of Vilnius University, Kretinga Monastery, various nobles and members of the clergy. In 1830–1831, during the November Uprising, together with Simonas Stanevičius, he visited libraries of Königsberg and studied sources of Lithuanian and Prussian languages, searched for and described Lithuanian books, and became acquainted with professors Ludwig Rhesa and Peter van Bohlen. In 1833, Pliateris financed the publication of Pažymės žemaitiškos gaidos (Notes of Samogitian melodies), a collection of sheet music for Lithuanian folk songs prepared by Stanevičius.

In a short time, Pliateris wrote several studies on the Lithuanian language, though due to his early death many were left unfinished and none were published during his lifetime. He completed short biographies of 27 Elders of Samogitia (Lithuanian translation by Jonas Šliūpas published in 1921) and an 18-page study about the Lithuanian translation of the Bible by Samuel Bogusław Chyliński (written in Lithuanian, discovered in 1959, and published in 1964). His manuscripts on the Lithuanian grammar, accentuation, and etymological tables were lost.

His Polish-language bibliographical work Materiały do historyi literatury języka litewskiego (Sources for the history of the Lithuanian language) was left unfinished. He completed 147 pages in which he described 39 Lithuanian, three Prussian, and seven Latvian books. The Prussian and Latvian books were included because Pliateris considered them to be written in Lithuanian dialects and not in different languages. He organized the books chronologically disregarding content or religious affiliation of the work. In crafting his descriptions, he used studies of the first Lithuanian hymnal by Gottfried Ostermeyer (1793) and of the Lithuanian Bibles by Ludwig Rhesa (1816). Pliateris described not only the books but also provided biographies of their authors. He cited more than 150 sources in Latvian, Lithuanian, Polish, Latin, French, Russian, and German languages.

== Library ==
Pliateris collected books, schematic plans of thirteen castles, portraits of the nobility, weapons (shields made of European bison skin), numismatic and archaeological artifacts, etc. He amassed a personal library of about 3,000 books and manuscripts. The library had copies of Postil of Mikalojus Daukša (1599), Polish–Latin–Lithuanian dictionary by Konstantinas Sirvydas, unpublished manuscript by Simonas Daukantas, Lithuanian sermon delivered on the occasion of the death of King Sigismund III Vasa in 1632, etc. The oldest known book is a Latin theological work by François de Coster (Francisco Costero) from 1586. Most likely Pliateris inherited the library of Dionizas Poška. The library was organized by Simonas Stanevičius who inherited it after Pliateris' death. Pliateris brother Kazimieras moved the library and employed Stanevičius at his manor in Stemplės. The collection was later moved back to Gedminaičiai, then to Švėkšna and Vepriai. Many items were lost during World War I; six boxes and a bag of most valuable books and documents were hidden by a local priest. Surviving books were donated to the Central Library in Kaunas in 1919. Books and documents from the original collection are now dispersed among different libraries in Lithuania and Latvia. In 2012, Domas Kaunas published a monograph analyzing the library. He described 91 items that belonged to the Pliateris collection, of them only 76 survived to present day. By 2016, Vilnius University Library identified 25 more books that once belonged to the library.
