= Silvestras Teofilis Valiūnas =

Lithuanian poet (1789–1831)

- Born: 11 July 1789; Near Raseiniai, Polish–Lithuanian Commonwealth
- Died: 1831 (aged 41–42); Samogitia, Russian Empire
- Education: Supreme Theological Seminary of Vilnius University
- Occupation: Poet
- Notable work: Birutė

Silvestras Teofilis Valiūnas (Polish: Sylwester Teofil Walenowicz; 11 July 1789 – 1831) was a Lithuanian poet. He is best known as the author of poem Birutė which became a popular Lithuanian folk song.

Born to a family of peasants, Valiūnas was educated as a Catholic priest at the Supreme Theological Seminary of Vilnius University where education was free. In 1812, he graduated with a master's in theology, but instead of joining the clergy he joined the 3rd Light Cavalry Lancers Regiment of the Imperial Guard in support of Napoleon's invasion of Russia. He then returned to Samogitia where he socialized with the nobility, particularly with the Bilevičius family (Billewicz). In 1831, he was mobilized to serve in the November Uprising. He died later that year under unknown circumstances.

Valiūnas wrote poetry in Lithuanian and Polish. His most important Lithuanian works are the poem Birutė (published in 1828) and verse letter to Dionizas Poška (published in 1850). Birutė is based on the legend recorded in the Lithuanian Chronicles about the marriage between Birutė (a pagan priestess according to the legend) and Grand Duke Kęstutis. It was written like a Lithuanian folk song and became very popular, with more than 200 known variations. The verse letter discussed the Lithuanian dictionary that Poška started compiling as well as the issue of standardizing the Lithuanian language. It is valued as an important document of the early Lithuanian National Revival. In Polish, Valiūnas wrote several satirical poems about a partying and drunken group of local officials and nobles. Later, he wrote four poems expressing his disillusionment with the society. His is considered one of the first poets of Romanticism in Lithuania.

== Biography ==
=== Early life and education ===
Valiūnas was born on 11 July 1789 in Paūnikiai in the Raseiniai parish. The exact location of Paūnikiai is not known. It could be a farmstead near Bedančiai or another name for Ūnikiai. His father was a peasant who, unlike most serfs, could freely move and relocate. In his school documents, Valiūnas is identified as a noble. His father died in 1803 and his uncle in 1805; there is no other information about his male relatives. Despite this, Valiūnas pursued education. In 1803, he enrolled at the powiat school in Raseiniai established by the Piarists. That year the school had five teachers and 192 students. Right around that time, it became a four-year school.

Valiūnas graduated in 1807 and, according to Liudvikas Adomas Jucevičius, enrolled at the Varniai Priest Seminary. However, a year later, when he became a student at the Supreme Theological Seminary of Vilnius University it was noted that Valiūnas did not previously attend any seminary. Vaclovas Biržiška claimed that Valiūnas initially attended Physics Faculty, but transferred to the Theological Seminary after only two weeks. The seminary was free and provided free room and board. Just few months into his first year at the seminary, Valiūnas became seriously ill with rheumatism and spent most of the winter in an infirmary. He was ill again (catarrh and fever) in spring and fall 1810.

Despite his poor health, Valiūnas was a good student and was invited to the philology seminar by professor Gottfried Ernst Groddeck. Clerics at the Theological Seminary could attend the same lectures as university students. Many of the university professors were liberal and praised Voltaire. This caused various discipline issues among the clerics. Valiūnas faced disciplinary measures because he was close to seven clerics who were dismissed from the seminary because they used to sneak out during the night to get drunk in inns.

=== Later life ===
On 28 May 1812, Valiūnas passed the exams to be ordained deacon. On 28 June 1812, Napoleon entered Vilnius without resistance during the French invasion of Russia. On 17 July, Valiūnas graduated from the Theological Seminary with a master's degree in theology. However, he was not ordained into priesthood. At 23 years old he was too young for ordination. Instead, he joined the 3rd Light Cavalry Lancers Regiment of the Imperial Guard in support of Napoleon. The lancers suffered a major defeat on 20 October 1812 at Slonim.

It is not known how long Valiūnas served in the Imperial Guard before he returned to his native Samogitia. It is not known if Valiūnas took any position in manors of the nobility. According to Liudvikas Adomas Jucevičius, Valiūnas was well liked and well received by the local nobility who valued his erudition, cheerfulness, and wit. In particular, he interacted with members of the Bilevičius family (Billewicz), an old Samogitian noble family. He was a classmate with three members of the family in Raseiniai and with Grigalijus Bilevičius in Vilnius.

After a few years, Valiūnas fell in love with a noblewoman. Her identity is now known, but it possibly was a sister of Pranas Bilevičius. However, he was turned away due to his low social status. He then retreated to the village of Aušbikavis near Vainutas which was governed by Steponas Bilevičius, a brother of Grigalijus (then dean in Kelmė). It is likely that Valiūnas was given the position of chamberlain (pakamorė or šambelionas) who greeted guests and served at the dinner table.

The November Uprising reached Raseiniai in March 1831. Rebels in Samogitia were commanded by Ezechielis Stanevičius who mobilized Valiūnas, as a veteran of the 1812 war, on 10 April 1831. Valiūnas was assigned to an infantry regiment. He signed a document on 4 June 1831. He died later that year, but circumstances of his death or his burial place are unknown. According to a short note by Benediktas Smigelskis, Valiūnas died of an accidental firearm discharge.

== Works ==
=== Birutė ===
==== Content and style ====
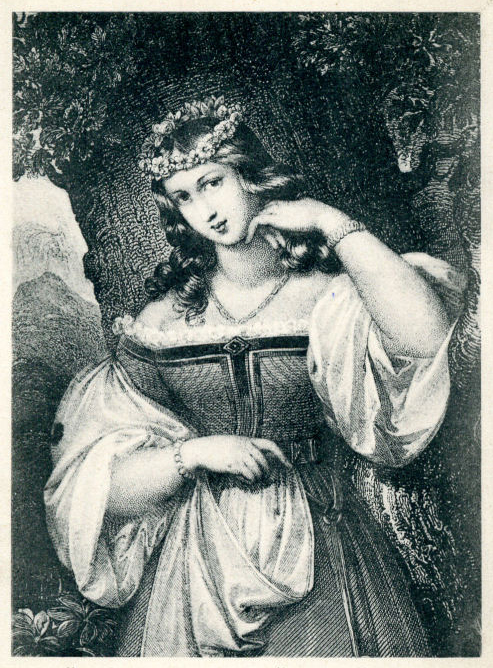
Romantic portrait of Birutė (1838)

Researchers believe that Valiūnas was inspired to write Birutė by Dionizas Poška who was interested in history. It was written around 1823. The plot is based on the legend recorded in the Lithuanian Chronicles and retold by Maciej Stryjkowski about the marriage between Birutė (a pagan priestess according to the legend) and Grand Duke Kęstutis.

The poem opens with a mention of a hill in Palanga that is known as the Birutė Hill (it is likely that Valiūnas visited Palanga around 1817). In the poem, Birutė is a modest, hardworking daughter of a poor man. She meets the Grand Duke who proposes to her on the spot. She obeys his desire and breaks her virginity promise to the pagan god Perkūnas. Kęstutis builds a palace on the hill where they met, now known as Birutė Hill, and Birutė gives birth to a son, the Grand Duke Vytautas the Great.

The poem is written concisely and simply by borrowing symbolism and elements from Lithuanian folk songs. Valiūnas did not use poetic devices other than epithets. Birutė is described particularly gently – she has blue eyes, wears a rue wreath and amber beads. This image became the symbol of a perfect Lithuanian woman. The mood is intimate and idyllic. The poem is the first Lithuanian literary ballad, a very popular poetic genre in Poland at the time, and has features of a theater play.

==== Reception and variations ====
Birutė became popular among the Lithuanian people and was sung as a folk song. Several later authors, including Wincenty Pol, Maironis, and Šatrijos Ragana, mentioned Birutė as a typical folk song or a synecdoche in their works. It evoked feelings of romantic nationalism, but was also sung as a love song or when a young woman faced prospects of an arranged marriage. Over 200 different variations of the poem were collected by folklore researchers. The poem was also sung in Polish.

Valiūnas's contemporaries hailed it as a new type of poem. The poem was translated to Polish in 1839 and to German in 1847. In 1836, Józef Ignacy Kraszewski wrote a Polish poem Biruta following Valiūnas's example. A copy of the poem along with its Polish translation was discovered among the papers of cardinal Giuseppe Mezzofanti. Laurynas Ivinskis wanted to published two versions of sheet music to Birutė in 1851. One followed the melody of Boże, coś Polskę, and the other was published in Šviesa in 1887 and became the basis for further harmonization by Lithuanian composers, including Juozas Žilevičius, Mikas Petrauskas, and Jonas Švedas.

Valiūnas's original poem has not survived. It is usually cited from three earliest sources. Birutė was first published as 54-line poem in the Polish magazine Kolumb likely by Kajetonas Nezabitauskis in 1828. A 60-line version is cited from a collection that Dionizas Poška complied around 1824. Poška, as an amateur historian, edited the poem to correct that Birutė was a daughter of a local noble and added information about her other children. Another version is cited from a collection of folk songs by Simonas Daukantas (copy made around 1829; collection published in 1846). This version became most popular among the people.

=== Collaboration with Poška ===
Valiūnas collaborated with Dionizas Poška and helped him compile an anthology of Polish and Lithuanian works Bitelė Baublyje or Pszczołka w Baublu (Little Bee in Baublys) and signed Poška's last will. Valiūnas translated Poška's poem Pas Ksaverą Bogušą, lietuvį, ir Jokimą Lelewelį, mozūrą (At Ksawery Bohusz's, a Lithuanian, and Joachim Lelewel's, a Masurian) to Polish. It was published by Kajetonas Nezabitauskis in 1829 in Dziennik Warszawski. He also translated French poem by Auguste de la Garde-Chambonas on the funeral of Tadeusz Kościuszko to Polish which is found in the anthology.

Valiūnas wrote a verse letter in Lithuanian Pas jo mylistos D. Poškos (At Dear D. Poška's) in 1826. This letter was published in 1850 in the calendars of Laurynas Ivinskis. In this letter Valiūnas discussed the Lithuanian dictionary that Poška started compiling as well as the issue of standardizing the Lithuanian language. Valiūnas uses classical rhetoric to praise Poška's accomplishments. The letter shows sober philological reasoning expressed in literary phrases and precise verse. By discussing the methodological problems of Lithuanian vocabulary, Valiūnas showcases his philological education, poetic talent, and dedication to his national identity.

Some of Valiūnas's thesis echoed key principles of the Lithuanian National Revival formulated towards the end of the 19th century. As such, Pas jo mylistos D. Poškos was cited and analyzed as an important document in the history of the national revival. Several Lithuanian literary historians and critics present Valiūnas not as the author of Birutė but as the author of the letter to Poška. Such works included an article in Aušra, works by Jonas Šliūpas, Maironis, Sofija Kymantaitė-Čiurlionienė, Vincas Mykolaitis-Putinas.

=== Satires about alcoholism ===
In 1816, Masonic lodge Palemonas (named after the legendary Palemonas) was established in Raseiniai which included most prominent society members from Raseiniai and Šiauliai powiats. In the same year, the Contubernium of Palemonas was established in Telšiai, possibly as a spoof of the Masonic lodge. Its members, known for drinking and partying, included many prominent local nobles and officials. Laurynas Ivinskis listed names of 30 men, including 14 judges and lawyers and six members of the clergy. Valiūnas wrote several satirical works about the contubernium and drunken exploits of its members. They are written not from a point of view of a bystander, but from a participant. Yet, they show no positive or redeeming qualities of the nobility. At the same time, they do not sympathize with the peasants or the serfs.

==== Contubernium of Telšiai–Plungė ====
Kontubernii Telszewsko-Płungiańskiej (Contubernium of Telšiai–Plungė) is a satirical poem in Polish written in July 1817. The poem is known from two fragments (a total of 878 lines): the first part was copied by Laurynas Ivinskis and second and third parts were preserved among the papers of Michał Eustachy Brensztejn at the National Library of Poland in Warsaw. Reportedly, Brensztejn had a copy of the poem with 1066 lines. The poem was first described by Leon Potocki who quoted a few fragments. According to him, the poem was originally written in Lithuanian and translated to Polish by Ivinskis. This claim is often repeated in academic literature, but lacks evidence.

The first part of the poem opens with a solemn address to Bacchus, the Roman god of wine. The members of the contubernium are given dignified but ironic titles that describe their role in the drinking parties. For example, the minister of finance poured all of his finances into bottles. Later, the poem deviates from the proper tone and includes language of the drunkards, coarse jokes, even vulgarities. The poem snubs all authority and paints grotesque and shocking caricatures to invoke disgust. The first part ends with a palinode and three panegyrics which address the three most prominent members of the contubernium, including abbot of the Telšiai Bernardine Monastery Ambraziejus Graurokas (Grawrogk) (1767–1825) and Marshal of Nobility of the Telšiai Powiat Leopoldas Gorskis (1787–1825).

The second part of the poem is a satirical report from the Great Žemaičių Kalvarija Festival of July 1817. The poem describes the chaotic and crowded scene of the religious fair. Noble intentions of getting an indulgence are lost and forgotten in the noise, heat, fatigue, hustle, drunkenness, pickpocketing, and other vices. The lyrical subject finds several members of the contubernium playing cards in a crowded inn and notes that he spotted at least 200 new members for the contubernium. The poem contains some allusions to poems by Ignacy Krasicki.

The third part of the poem is a letter about baths at the sea in Palanga which had become a fashionable means of curing all kinds of diseases. Driven by herd mentality, the lyrical subject visits Palanga, observes the questionable medical practices, and notices only two reliable results of the treatments – thinner men's purses and thicker women. This part does not feature members of the contubernium, but is addressed to their leader abbot Graurokas.

==== Related works ====
In 1817, Valiūnas published a 200-line satirical poem Oświadczenie (Statement) in the Polish magazine Dziennik Wileński published in Vilnius. Writing as an insulted member of the Contubernium of Palemonas, Valiūnas critiques the book on alcohol and alcoholism by Jokūbas Šimkevičius by attempting to showcase alcohol's virtues from Biblical Lot and Greek poet Anacreon to today's realities in Samogitia where people can be happy only when drinking or sleeping. It was the first published work by Valiūnas, but attracted no interest from his contemporaries.

Valiūnas also wrote several satirical poems in Lithuanian: Šlovė Bachuso (Glory to Bacchus), Kalėdos (Christmas), Telšių miestas yr ant kalno (Telšiai is on a Hill), and Eilos apie sprovą (Verse about Lawsuit). These are anonymous works found among the papers of Simonas Daukantas, Petras Kriaučiūnas, and Jurgis Pabrėža, but are attributed to Valiūnas.

Šlovė Bachuso is a 48-line poem closely resembling Contubernium of Telšiai–Plungė. Telšių miestas yr ant kalno made fun of the drunks at palestra, a type of apprenticeship for attorneys. According to memoirs of Andrzej Przyjalgowski published in 1844, satires about the palestra circulated locally and even disrupted its normal operations. Among others, the poem pokes fun at bishop Józef Arnulf Giedroyć. The 30-line poem was first published by Valclovas Biržiška in Mūsų senovė in 1940. Eilos apie sprovą at 168 lines is the longest of these poems and satirizes the legal system – trial process, attorney greed and fraud. It was written down with melody. It is likely that the other poems were also intended to be sung.

=== Disillusionment with the society ===
Valiūnas wrote several poems expressing his disillusionment with the society. In 1978, Regina Mikšytė discovered a 424-line Lithuanian poem dedicated to Vincentas Sasnauskas, brother-in-law of Dionizas Poška. The poem was likely written in 1822. In the poem, 34-year old Valiūnas asks existential questions and discusses what profession a poor man of low birth should pick. He goes through the typical occupations (military officer, doctor, priest, farmer, manor owner, man of letters) revealing societal norms of the time and his feelings that he does not fit into the society. The poem reflected philosophy of Jean-Jacques Rousseau and early Romanticism. It is a satire exposing society's and man's vices and flaws.

Similar ideas about the conflict between a poet and the society are expressed in Valiūnas' Polish verse letter Duma nad nędzą wierszopisów (Thoughts on the Misery of Poetry). The poem is addressed to "dear president" which likely refers to Ezechielis Stanevičius, president of courts in Raseiniai and later one of the commanders of the Uprising of 1831. Vaclovas Biržiška and earlier authors usually point to Simonas Stanevičius, but there is no evidence that they knew each other. It is a satire about a life faced by poets – singing about the joyous and the good while living in poverty, fearing political persecution for telling the truth, and ending the days in a shelter for beggars. The poem discusses biographies of famous poets who died in poverty and obscurity, including Homer, Petrarch, Torquato Tasso, John Milton. He also included more local examples of Jan Kochanowski, Adam Naruszewicz, Ignacy Krasicki and how they compromised their beliefs when faced with political and economic pressures.

Valiūnas wrote two Polish elegies Nad nędzą człowieka (On the Misery of Man) and Grabówka w Auźbikowskim lesie (Hornbeams in the Forest of Aušbikavis) which are known from copies found in archives of Laurynas Ivinskis. Nad nędzą człowieka discusses the nature of man, particularly the desire for power, and contrasts it with the animals which are free. It is a melancholic and philosophical poem that searches for an abstract ideal which is typical of early Romanticism. It bears similarities to Night-Thoughts by Edward Young. Grabówka w Auźbikowskim lesie depicts lyrical subject searching for strength and freedom from society in nature. Only 40 lines of this poem are known.

=== Other works ===
The last known poem by Valiūnas was dedicated to the 75th birthday (1829) of bishop Juozapas Arnulfas Giedraitis. It was a short poem greeting the bishop in the name of Samogitian peasants. Valiūnas's contemporaries mentioned that many other anecdotes and epigrams circulated among the locals, but they have not survived or are impossible to determine the authorship.

In his biography of Valiūnas, Liudvikas Adomas Jucevičius stated that most his most famous work was a Polish poem in 24 cantos Sobieskiada about King John III Sobieski, but there is no evidence that Valiūnas wrote such a poem. It is possible that Jucevičius erroneously attributed a translation of an Italian poem about Sobieski published in Tygodnik Wileński in 1816. Similarly, Jucevičius attributed Lithuanian song Esu sau žmogelis to Valiūnas, but it was written by Jurgis Pabrėža. Jucevičius also listed Polish poem Listy Pośmierckiego (Posthumous Letters) but no such poem survives.

== Legacy ==
The first biography of Valiūnas was written and published by Liudvikas Adomas Jucevičius. He painted a romantic portrait of a tortured artist: a lonely and misunderstood poet who was rejected by the society due to his low birth and impoverished station. He retreated to a village where he lived in poverty but continued to create. In 1976–1978, Regina Mikšytė published a collection of Valiūnas's works in Polish and Lithuanian as well as his academic biography.

Valiūnas's burial place is unknown. A symbolic grave stone to Valiūnas was erected in the cemetery of Aušbikavis in 2014 while commemorating his 225th birth anniversary.

== Bibliography ==
- Ardoino, Diego (2022). ""Poesia in lingua Biruta". Apie iki šiol nežinomą Silvestro Valiūno dainos "Birutė" egzemplorių lietuvių kalba kardinolo Giuseppe Mezzofanti rankraštiniame archyve". In Judžentytė-Šinkūnienė, Gintarė; Gaidienė, Andželika; Gritėnienė, Aurelija (eds.). 27th Jonas Jablonskis' Conference. (Language) Variability, Change and Standardization (in Lithuanian). Vilnius University Press. doi:10.15388/JablonskisConf.2022. ISBN 978-609-07-0773-9.
- Biržiška, Vaclovas (1990) [1963]. Aleksandrynas: senųjų lietuvių rašytojų, rašiusių prieš 1865 m., biografijos, bibliografijos ir biobibliografijos (in Lithuanian). Vol. II (2nd ed.). Vilnius: Sietynas. OCLC 28707188.
- Girdzijauskas, Juozas, ed. (2001). Lietuvių literatūros istorija: XIX amžius (PDF) (in Lithuanian). Vilnius: Lietuvių literatūros ir tautosakos institutas. ISBN 9986513693.
- Lebedys, Jurgis (1972). Lituanistikos baruose (in Lithuanian). Vol. 1. Vilnius: Vaga. OCLC 1049923.
- Lukšienė, Meilė (2014). Prie tautos kultūros pamatų (in Lithuanian). Vilnius: Lietuvos Respublikos švietimo ir mokslo ministerijos Švietimo aprūpinimo centras. ISBN 978-9986-03-670-8.
- Mikšytė, Regina (1978). Silvestras Valiūnas (in Lithuanian). Vilnius: Vaga. OCLC 4584440.
- Petrikaitė, Jūratė (2008). "Silvestro Valiūno "Birutės" folkloriniai variantai". Tautosakos darbai (in Lithuanian). 35: 175–183. ISSN 1392-2831.
