= Annette Krauss =

Annette Krauss (born 1971) is a Dutch female artist, writer and educator. Krauss is a member of the Read-in collective and her projects include Read the Masks. Tradition is Not Given, Hidden Curriculum, Sites for Unlearning, and Spaces of Commoning. She was course leader of the Master Fine Arts at the HKU between 2017 and 2023 and Elise-Richter-Peek Post-Doc researcher at Academy of Fine Arts Vienna. Since 2023 she is professor for Art and Communication Practices at the University of Applied Arts Vienna.

== Work ==
=== Read the Masks. Tradition is Not Given ===
A collaboration between Annette Krauss, Swedish artist Petra Bauer, and the two Dutch cultural and activist groups Untold and Doorbraak investigating and protesting against the Dutch phenomenon of the racist black-face tradition, called Zwarte Piet (Black Pete). Read the Masks looks at the underlying institutional structures in Dutch society in upholding this tradition, its involvement in broader racist structures of which Zwarte Piet is but a symptom.

The project has been first realized in the context of the exhibition Be(com)ing Dutch at Van Abbemuseum 2008–2011. It consists of three parts: an installation and announcements for a performance and protest march that never happened (2008), debates (2008) and a film by Annette Krauss and Petra Bauer (2009).

Read the Masks. Tradition is Not Given is discussed in White Innocence: Paradoxes of Colonialism and Race by Gloria Wekker (2016), The Emancipated Museum by Steven ten Thije (2017), and "A Heteronomous Hobby: Report from the Netherlands" by Sven Lütticken (2011).

=== Hidden Curriculum ===
The art project Hidden Curriculum is a collaboration with high school students. It revolves around the question of how high school students investigate a so-called hidden curriculum in their specific everyday school environment. Krauss' understanding of the term 'hidden curriculum' is everything that is learned in school next to the official curriculum.

Long-term collaborations, and exhibitions for Hidden Curriculum were realized with the help of Casco Art Institute in 2007 (with Gerrit Rietveld College, and Amadeus Lyceum Utrecht), at The Showroom 2012, and Whitechapel Gallery 2012–2013.

Hidden Curriculum is discussed in Documenting Secrets by Hannah Jickling and Helen Reed; "Annette Krauss e.a. – Hidden Curriculum" in onderwijs filosofie (2017); I think the artistic is like a double-edged sword. by Laila Huber (2014); and "… To be hidden does not mean to be merely revealed – Part 2: Artistic research on hidden curriculum" in Medienimpulse 2015.

=== Sites for Unlearning ===
The Sites for Unlearning are constructed as experimental gatherings with the aim to unlearn something collaboratively, and to study unlearning with regards to already existing articulations: Site for Unlearning (Zwarte Piet) (2011–ongoing), Site for Unlearning (to Ride a Bike) (2012–ongoing), and Site for Unlearning (Art Organization) (2014–2018), Site for Unlearning (my Library) (2013-ongoing).

Site for Unlearning (Art Organization) has been exhibited in We Are The Time Machines, exhibition participation at Casco Art Institute: Working for the Commons, Utrecht 2016; Shapes of Knowledge, exhibition participation at Monash University Museum of Art 2019; Dark Energy, exhibition at Academy of Fine Arts Vienna 2019.

Sites for Unlearning are discussed in "Unlearning Routines of the Impossible" co-edited by Annette Krauss and Janine Armin; "The Bureau of Care: Introductory Notes on the Care-less and Care-full" by iLiana Fokianaki (2020); "Elephants in the Room at Casco Art Institute" by Valentina Vella (2019); “Boiler Room Conversation” between Danny Butt, Nuraini Juliastuti, and Annette Krauss, MUMA (2019); Unlearning Exercises. Book, edited with Binna Choi, Yolande van der Heide and Liz Allan, published by Valiz and Casco Art Institute 2018; and Unlearning institutional habits: an arts-based perspective on organizational unlearning. Article in The Learning Organization 2019.

=== Read-in ===
Annette Krauss is co-founder of the cultural collective Read-in.

Feminist Search Tools. Artistic Research Project with fellow Read-in members Sven Engels and Laura Pardo, Hackers & Designers members André Fincato and Anja Groten, and Ola Hassanain, Aggeliki Diakrousi and Alice Strete.

Haunted Bookshelves_In Circulation. Part of Hauntopia/What if?, exhibition and Conference at Research Pavillon Venice 2017.

=== Spaces of Commoning ===
Spaces of Commoning: Artistic Research and the Utopia of the Everyday. Book, edited with Anette Baldauf, Stefan Gruber, Moira Hille, Vladimir Miller, Mara Verlič, Hong-Kai Wang and Julia Wieger, published by Sternberg Press 2016.

Study of/as Commoning. Article with Anette Baldauf, Vladimir Miller, Mara Verlic, Moira Hille, Hong-Kai Wang, Mihret Kebede Alwabie, Julia Wieger, Tesfaye Beri Bekele and Stefan Gruber in Journal for Artistic Research 2019.
