= Beirut (disambiguation) =

Beirut is the capital city of Lebanon.

Beirut, Beyrut or Bayrut may also refer to:

== Places ==
- Greater Beirut, an urban agglomeration comprising the city of Beirut and the adjacent municipalities
- Beirut Governorate, a Lebanese governorate
- Beirut Vilayet, a first-level administrative division (vilayet) of the Ottoman Empire
- Berytus, the ancient city of Beirut
- Beirut River, a river in Lebanon
- Beyrut, Iran, a village in Iran

== Arts and entertainment ==
- Beirut (band), an indie band which originated in New Mexico
- Beirut, a 1997 compilation album by Fairuz
- Beirut, a 2018 studio album by Massari
- Beirut (art space), an art space in Egypt
- Beirut (film), a 2018 American political thriller film directed by Brad Anderson
- "Beirut", a song by Peter Sarstedt

== Other uses ==
- Beirut (drinking game), a drinking game
- Beirut, official name of extra solar planet HD 192263 b

== See also ==
- Bayreuth, a town in Germany
- West Beirut (film), a 1998 Lebanese drama film directed by Ziad Doueiri
- Bierut, a surname (including a list of people with the name)
- Beirute sandwich
- Beyrouth Après Rasage, a film by Hani Tamba
- Beyrout meteorite of 1921, which fell in Beirut, Lebanon; See Meteorite falls
- Biruta (disambiguation)
