= Biruta (given name) =

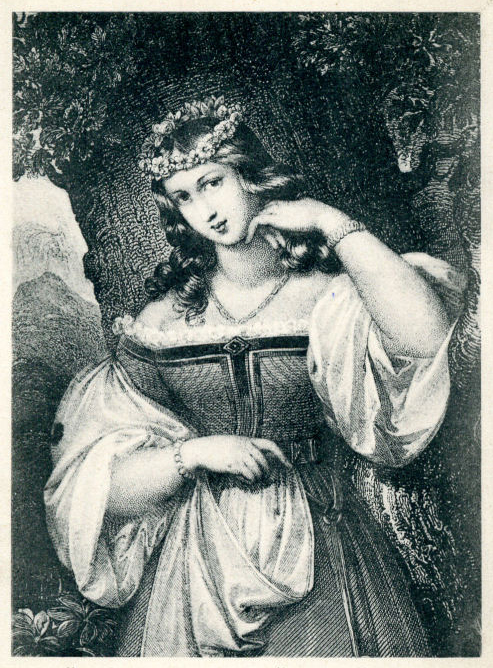
- Grand Duchess of Lithuania Birutė
- Gender: Female
- Name day: February 5

Origin
- Origin: From Lithuanian Birutė
- Meaning: Snow
- Region of origin: Latvia, Lithuania

Other names
- Related names: Birutė

Biruta or Birutė is a Latvian and Lithuanian feminine given name, which means "snow", derived from the Lithuanian word byrančiu. The associated name day is June 1.

== Letovia ==
People with the name include:

- Birutė of Palanga (died 1382), Grand Duchess of Lithuania, worshiped as a female deity
- Biruta Baumane (1922–2017), Latvian painter
- Birutė Ciplijauskaitė (1929–2017), Lithuanian literary scholar
- Birutė Dominauskaitė (born 1973), Soviet Lithuanian basketball player
- Birutė Galdikas (1946–2026), Lithuanian-Canadian anthropologist, primatologist, and academic
- Biruta Hulanicki, younger sister of Polish fashion designer Barbara Hulanicki, and namesake of fashion store Biba
- Rūta Birutė Jokubonienė (1930–2010), Lithuanian textile artist
- Birutė Kalėdienė (born 1934, née Zalogaitytė), Lithuanian athlete
- Birutė Kavaliauskienė, mother of Lithuanian basketball player Antanas Kavaliauskas
- Biruta Khertseva-Khertsberga (born 1944), Soviet slalom canoeist
- Birutė Landsbergis, Lithuanian musician, daughter of Vytautas Landsbergis
- Biruta Lewaszkiewicz-Petrykowska (1927–2022), judge of the Constitutional Tribunal of Poland
- Birutė Mikalonienė, Lithuanian translator
- Birutė Nedzinskienė (1955–1994), Lithuanian politician
- Biruta Ozolina, wife of the Italian ambassador to Thailand, featured in the painting The White and the Black
- Birutė Paukštienė, director of the Ignalina Mikas Petrauskas music school
- Birute Regine, British business consultant of Harvest Associates, wife of Roger Lewin
- Birutė Šakickienė (born 1968) Lithuanian rower
- Birutė Neringa Simonaitis, daughter of Erdmonas Simonaitis
- Biruta Skujeniece, Latvian actress-poet sister of Marģers Skujenieks
- Birutė Užkuraitytė (born 1953), Lithuanian swimmer
- Birutė Valionytė (born 1956), Lithuanian politician
- Birutė Vėsaitė (born 1951), Lithuanian politician

== Characters ==
Fictional characters with this name include:

- Biruta (dog), a fictional dog created by Lygia Fagundes Telles, from the eponymous short story Biruta.
- Biruta Aze, a fictional character from the 1947 Soviet film Victorious Return
- Biruta Baiba, a fictional character from the 2016 Latvian film The Chronicles of Melanie
