= Biruta (disambiguation) =

Biruta may refer to:

== People ==
- Biruta (given name) or Birutė, a Lithuanian and Latvian female given name
- Biruta (mythology) or Birutė, mythologized version of Birutė, the wife of Grand Duke Kęstutis, the priestess of Palanga, worshipped as a deity
- Gilvydas Biruta (born 1991), a Lithuanian basketball player
- Vincent Biruta (born 1958), a Rwandan physician and politician

== Places ==
- Biruta (ancient city); the historic ancient city of antiquity at the core of Beirut, Lebanon; before Alexander
- Berytus, the Hellenistic, Roman, Byzantine era version of the city of Beirut, also Biruta in the local language at the time of Alexander.

== Other uses ==
- Biruta (poem), a poem by Silvestras Teofilis Valiūnas, that became a Lithuanian song, composed in the Samogitian dialect
- Biruta (short story), a short story by Lygia Fagundes Telles featuring a dog named Biruta
- Biruta (armoured vehicle), a Polish tank; see 2nd Armoured Brigade (Poland)

== See also ==
- Birute (disambiguation)
