= Birutė (disambiguation) =

Birutė was the second wife of Kęstutis, Grand Duke of Lithuania.

Birute or Birutė may also refer to:

== Places ==
- Birutė Hill, Palanga, Lithuania; a hill that formerly hosted a pagan shrine famous in Lithuanian history and myth
- 212977 Birutė, the minor planet, the 212977th registered, an inner Solar System asteroid

== People ==
- Biruta (given name) or Birutė, a Lithuanian and Latvian female given name
- Birutė (mythology) or Biruta, mythologized version of the wife of Kęstutis, the priestess of Palanga, worshipped as a deity

== Other uses ==
- Birutė Society, the first cultural non-religious society of Prussian Lithuanians
- Birutė (opera), the first Lithuanian opera (1906)
- Birutė, a brand of bottle water manufactured by Volfas Engelman
- Grand Duchess Birute Uhlan Battalion, Lithuanian Armed Forces

== See also ==
- Biruta (disambiguation)
