= Adelita Husni-Bey =

Italian-Libyan visual artist

- Born: Adelita Husni-Bey
- Occupation: Artist
- Years active: 2006
- Known for: Visual arts

Adelita Husni-Bey (born 1985) is an Italian-Libyan visual artist. She made the film Postcards from the Desert Island (2011). She was awarded the 2023 Black Mountain College prize. Husni-Bey was also a 2020-2022 fellow at the Vera List Center for Art and Politics. Her work is in the collections of MoMA and the Whitney Museum. She was chosen to represent Italy at the 2017 Venice Biennale.

== Work ==
Husni-Bey's work is rooted in anarcho-collectivist practices. It is often the result of long form collaborations and educational workshops, which result in video or photographs documenting the process. The subject matter focuses on systemic problems and the role of the law.

== White Paper ==
The work White Paper (2014 - ongoing) consists of an ongoing research into the relationship between the notion of property, legislation, and the right to housing under capitalism. It focuses on three countries: Egypt, The Netherlands and Spain. The first chapter White Paper: The Land (2014) was presented in Cairo at Beirut (art space). It consists of a video-installation focused on the land rights of people affected by the mega-urban development Cairo 2050, a government-backed and privately funded metropolitan development plan of massive proportions, which threatens the livelihood of many informal settlements such as the neighbourhood of Gezirat al-Qursaya and Ramlet Boulaq. The second chapter White Paper: The Law (2015) was supported by Casco (Utrecht) and it resulted in a legal document, the Convention on the Use of Space. The document was written through a series of public drafting meetings across the Netherlands in collaboration with squatters, lawyers, housing rights activists, tenants associations and the general public. For the last chapter of the project White Paper: The Imaginary (2016) the Convention travelled to Spain, to Móstoles neighbourhood in Madrid and it was hosted by CA2M. The project was carried on in various independent spaces and squatted social centres, where a number of public meetings were held to draw up the Spanish version of the text. The project is documented by a book, White Paper On Land, law And The Imaginary edited by Antonia Alampi, Binna Choi, Jens Maier-Rothe, Pablo Martínez.

The Reading / La Seduta, was presented at the Italian Pavilion, curated by Cecilia Alemani, at the 2017 Venice Biennale.

== Exhibitions ==
- 2019 Adelita Husni Bey: Chiron, New Museum, New York
- 2015 Movement Break, Kadist Art Foundation, San Francisco
