= Kajetonas Nezabitauskis =

Lithuanian activist

Kajetonas Rokas Nezabitauskis-Zabitis (Polish: Kajetan Roch Niezabitowski; 17 July 1800 – 11 April 1876) was a Lithuanian patriot promoting the use of the Lithuanian language during the early stages of the Lithuanian National Revival. He was the half-brother of the priest Kiprijonas Nezabitauskis. After law studies at Vilnius University, he moved to Warsaw where he worked at the state censorship office until retirement in 1857. His main work is a Lithuanian primer published in 1824. It was the first illustrated primer as well as the first to include Lithuanian proverbs. It was accompanied by the first Lithuanian bibliography – a list of 73 Lithuanian-language books and manuscripts between 1557 and 1824. He edited the Polish calendar Kalendarz powszechny in 1835–1850.

== Biography ==
Nezabitauskis was born in Baidotai near Salantai, Samogitia, then part of the Russian Empire, to a family of free peasants. Born as Zabitis, he followed the example of his elder half-brother and Polonized his name to Niezabitowski and adopted the Lubicz coat of arms to appear to be from the Lithuanian nobility. He attended a Dominican school in Žemaičių Kalvarija and a gymnasium in Kaunas. In October 1821, he became a student in the Law Faculty of Vilnius University.

At the university, he met other Samogitians who supported and promoted the use of the Lithuanian language (the early stages of the Lithuanian National Revival) and joined their activities. In particular, he was close with Dionizas Poška who in his last will even left his Lithuanian manuscripts to Nezabitauskis (though, it appears that Nezabitauskis did not actually get them). Together with professor Ivan Loboiko, Nezabitauskis traveled across Samogitia collecting information on Lithuanian dialects.

With help from Count Nikolay Rumyantsev, Nezabitauskis obtained a position in Warsaw as an adjunct of the Ministry of Education in 1825. He later became secretary at the state censorship office. He retired with a state pension in 1857. In Warsaw, he wrote and published some works in Polish, but due to his day job he was disliked by various activists. He died in Warsaw in 1876.

== Works ==
=== Lithuanian primer ===
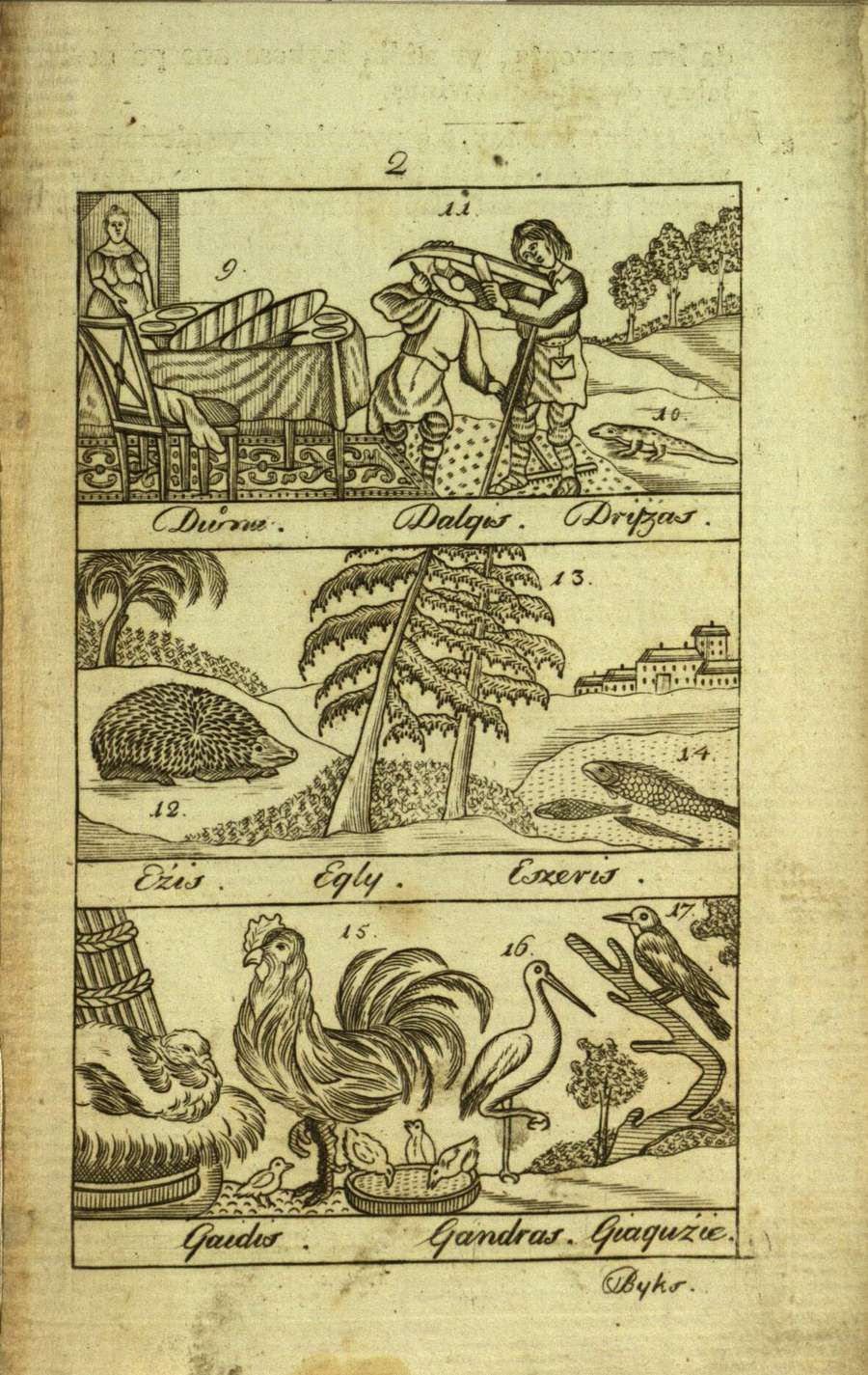
Illustrations of letters D, E, and G from the primer by Nezabitauskis

In 1824, Nezabitauskis published a primer of the Lithuanian language entitled Naujas moksłas skaytima diel maźū waykū Źemaycziu yr Lietuwos (New Education on Reading for Little Children of Samogitia and Lithuania). It was the first illustrated primer in Lithuanian that used images to teach letters – e.g. an image of a horse (arklys in Lithuanian) for the letter a. As reading exercises, he included 53 Lithuanian proverbs. It was an important addition not only because it was one of the first publications of Lithuanian folklore but also because earlier primers included only religious texts (catechism and prayers) and a poem praising corporal punishment in schools.

The primer was published in 3,000 copies and was sold out in less than a year. Five copies were sent to Count Nikolay Rumyantsev via professor Ivan Loboiko. The primer was praised by the Tsarist government and Nezabitauskis even received an expensive ring as a reward. In 1860, Mikalojus Akelaitis prepared a second edition, but it was not published. Dionizas Poška highly praised the primer for its linguistic purity, good spelling, and style, and wanted to publish a Polish translation.

The primer also included the first bibliography of Lithuanian-language books published in Lithuania. It listed 73 books and manuscripts between 1547 and 1824. This bibliography, translated into Polish and expanded, was republished in Dziennik Wileński. The bibliography was republished by Laurynas Ivinskis in 1860 and Leon Potocki in 1869. Nezabitauskis continued to update the bibliography and in 1829 prepared a 14-page list that he hoped but failed to publish as a separate booklet. He also was working on a history of Lithuania in Polish. These manuscripts were held at the Polish Museum in Rapperswil, Switzerland, until World War I and at the National Museum in Warsaw where they were lost during World War II.

=== Other works ===
Nezabitauskis published an article on the Baubliai museum established by Dionizas Poška in Dziennik Wileński in 1823 and published Poška's historical work Rosmyślanie wieśniaka rolnika (Thoughts of a Village Farmer) in 1829. In Gazeta Warszawska, Nezabitauskis published some articles regarding Lithuanian matters (e.g. about calendars published by Laurynas Ivinskis or history of the Samogitian Diocese published by Motiejus Valančius). Together with Franciszek Zatorski (Pranas Zatorskis), he translated nine Lithuanian folk songs into Polish that were published by Oskar Kolberg in 1846. Nezabitauskis prepared a manuscript on the Lithuanian grammar in Polish in 1823 and revised it in 1837, but it was not published.

In 1832, he edited Tygodnik Polski, but only ten issues appeared. From 1835 to 1850, he edited Polish calendar Kalendarz powszechny. He also translated historical and moral works from German and French into Polish.

In letters to professor Michał Wiszniewski and Simonas Daukantas, Nezabitauskis claimed authorship of an unfinished manuscript of a Lithuanian–Polish dictionary and of a 75-page booklet on beekeeping translated from a Polish work by Jan Krzysztof Kluk. While this claim has been rebuked by literary historians who showed that the works were written by his half-brother Kiprijonas Nezabitauskis, it is still sometimes repeated. In the same letter to Wiszniewski, Nezabitauskis claimed that he was the author of a Polish prayer book mistakenly published under the name of Bishop Jan Paweł Woronicz (according to Nezabitauskis, the bishop only contributed an introduction). The prayer-book was published in 1825 and republished in 1832, 1833, 1836 and 1847.
