= Petra Bauer =

Artist and film maker (born 1970)

- Born: 1970 (age 55–56)

Petra Bauer (born 1970) is a Swedish artist and filmmaker. She is Research Leader at the Royal Institute of Art in Stockholm, Sweden. Her art intersects with political and social organizing, especially by women, and includes many collaborations with existing organizations.

== Art career ==
Bauer's artwork is grounded in feminist theory and engages with issues including immigration, colonialism, and the history of women's efforts to organize themselves and their communities within the art world and beyond. Her research has engaged with the history of radical filmmaking, notably The Berwick Street Film Collective, Cinema Action and The London Women's Film Group; this has resulted in filmmaking collaborations with the Southall Black Sisters, a London-based group that organizes against violence and discrimination towards women. Her 2016 film Workers!, with SCOT-PEP, documents the labor concerns of sex workers as they occupy and infiltrate space of the Scottish Trade Union Congress. The 2003 film Der Fall Joseph (The Case of Joseph) reflected on the death of an immigrant child in Germany, and surrounding narratives of discrimination, fascism, false testimony, and the right to have a death investigated.

In 2008, Bauer worked with artist Annette Krauss to produce Read the Masks, Tradition Is Not Given, an installation and planned demonstration at Van Abbemuseum. This piece criticized the black face Zwarte Piet tradition in the Netherlands. Their planned program was cancelled due to death threats.

Bauer's work has been included in the 2015 Venice Biennale, the 8th Göteborg International Biennial for Contemporary Art, the 2018 Riga International Biennial of Contemporary Art, and in Apexart's 2021 exhibition Voicing the Silence.

== Collaborative work ==
Bauer's artistic projects are generally organized as collaborations with other artists or organizations; some of her collaborators have included Southall Black Sisters (London); Scot-Pep (Edinburgh); and The Women's Centre in Tensta-Hjulsta (Stockholm). She created the Feminist Research Group with curators and theorists Nataša Petrešin-Bachelez, Marius Dybwad Brandrud, Binna Choi, Kirsten Lloyd, Frances Stacey, and Marina Vishmidt to study collective practices of care.
