= Gerrit Rietveld College =

Secondary school in Utrecht, the Netherlands

Coordinates: 52°6′37.01″N 5°8′11.00″E

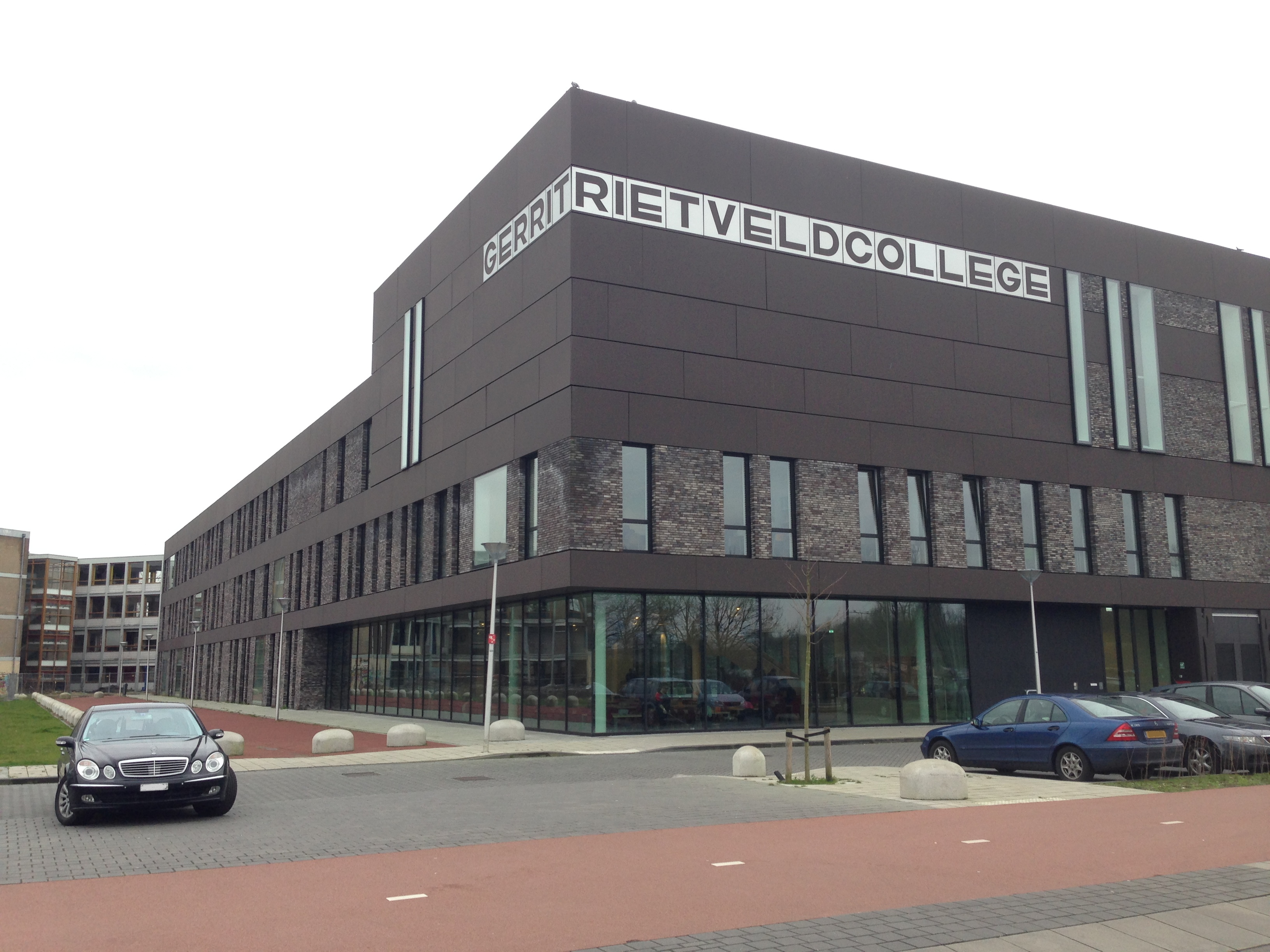
- Gerrit rietveld college feb2016
- General
Location	Eykmanlaan 1200, 3571 KH, Utrecht (Tuindorp)
Founded	2005
Type	vwo havo mavo technasium
Denomination	rk/pc
Authorised supervision	Willibrord Stichting
- People
Head Master	Mevr. Y. Petermeijer
Co-Head Master	Dhr. T. M. Kragten
Students	1.180
- Additional
Abbreviation	GRC
Website	http://www.gerritrietveldcollege.nl
Portal	Education

The Gerrit Rietveld College is a high school in Utrecht, The Netherlands. Around 1.250 students are educated at the school. The school is named after the Dutch architect Gerrit Rietveld. The following Dutch education levels are offered at the school: Gymnasium, atheneum, havo and mavo.

== History ==
The Gerrit Rietveld College is the product of a merge between College De Klop and College Blaucapel in 2005. The school building from College De Klop was demolished and a new neighbourhood was built on the area.

The new merged school was housed in the building of College Blaucapel for 10 years. A new school building was constructed in the backyard of the old building. The school moved to the new building during the Christmas holidays in 2014/2015.

== Education ==
The students in the building have their own classroom spaces, so called 'domains'. As opposed to most schooling in the Netherlands, the teacher comes to the students instead of the other way around. This way the students have their own place in the school building.

The school is the only school in Utrecht offering Technasium education. In this education trajectory students get an additional subject called Research & Development (R&D). The goal is to introduce students to technical professions.

== Architecture and Art ==
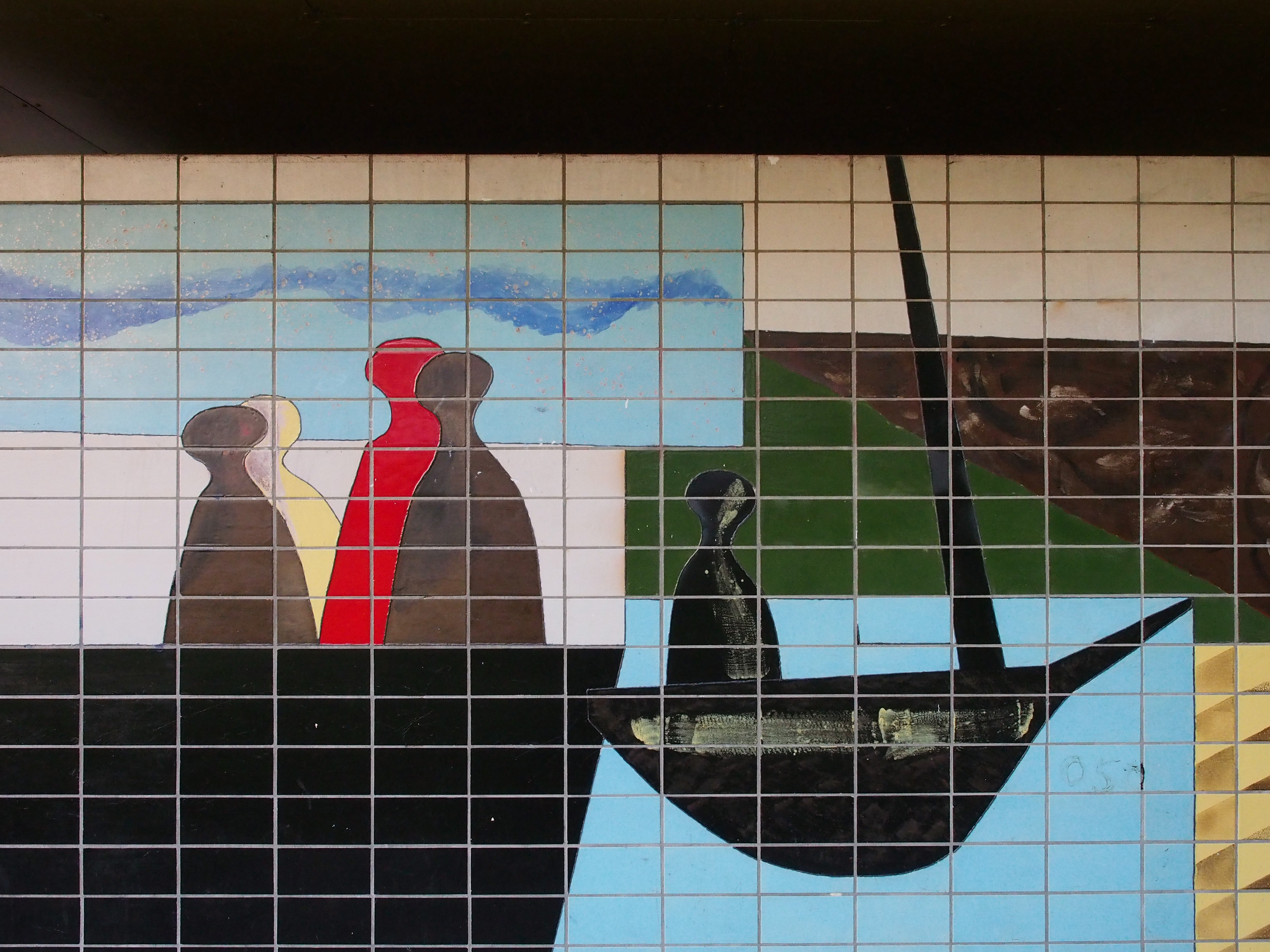
Decoration in the old building by Dick Elffers.

The old building that the school left in the end of 2014 has been built in 1964–1965 to a design of the architect Kees Elffers.
