= Birutė Valionytė =

Lithuanian politician (born 1956)

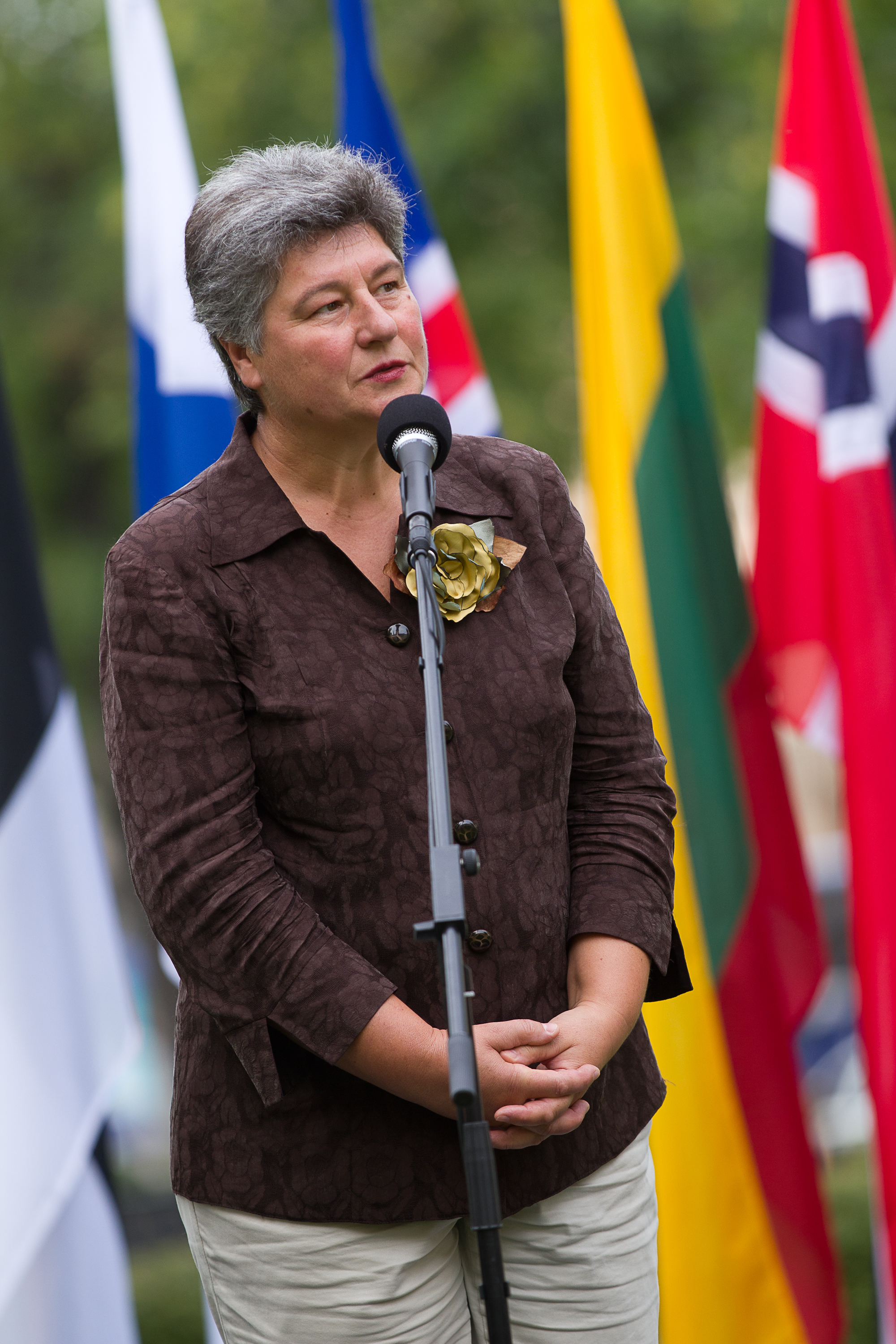
Birutė Valionytė

Birutė Valionytė (born 7 October 1956 in Rokiškis District Municipality) is a Lithuanian politician. In 1990 she was among those who signed the Act of the Re-Establishment of the State of Lithuania.
