= Dionizas Poška =

- Born: October 1, 1764; Lėlaičiai
- Died: May 12, 1830 (aged 65); Barzdžiai

Dionizas Poška (Polish: Dionizy Paszkiewicz; October 1764 – 12 May 1830) was a Lithuanian poet, historian and lexicographer sometimes described also as Polish–Lithuanian. He contributed to the early 19th-century Samogitian Revival, the early stage of the Lithuanian National Revival. Born to a family of petty Samogitian nobility, Poška attended Kražiai College. From 1786–1821, with some breaks, Poška worked as a lawyer, regent, clerk in the courts of Raseiniai. From 1790, he lived in the purchased Barzdžiai manor.

Poška excavated ancient graves and hillforts, collected archeological fossils, weapons, money, books. In 1812, he established the first museum of antiquities in Lithuania, within the trunk of a thousand-year-old oak called Baublys. He corresponded and communicated with Samogitians such as bishop Juozapas Arnulfas Giedraitis, Jurgis Plateris, Simonas Daukantas, Silvestras Valiūnas, Kajetonas Nezabitauskis and others as well as Vilnius University professorship, e.g. Joachim Lelewel and Ivan Loboiko.

Poška wrote his works in Lithuanian and Polish. Most of his works remained only as manuscripts, which were included in a compilation of his own and other authors' works. His only works that were published during his lifetime were the verse letter "Pas kuniga Xawera Bohusza Lietuwi, yr Jokimą Leleweli Mozura" (from 1810) and two historical articles.

His most famous work is the epic poem "Mužikas Žemaičių ir Lietuvos" (in contemporary spelling: Mużikas Żiamajćziu ir Lietuwos; the name is translatable to "The Peasant of Samogitia and Lithuania"). The epic poem was written c. 1815-1825, but printed only in 1886. He also compiled a trilingual Polish–Latin–Lithuanian dictionary from 1825 onwards but did not finish it.

== Biography ==
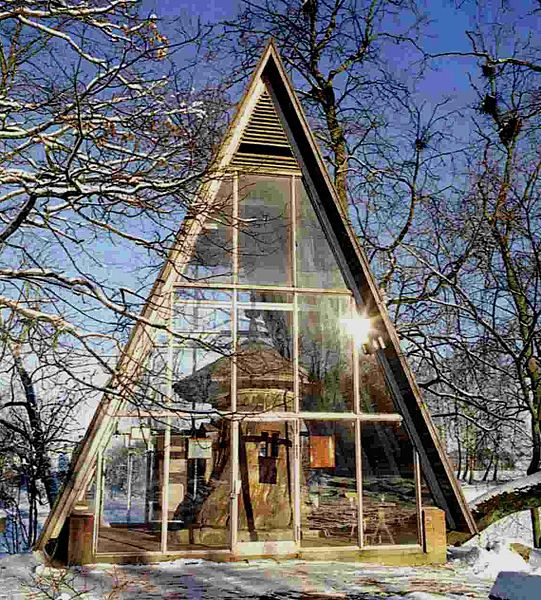
A Baublys at Bijotai manor, a museum of Dionizas Poška

Until 2004, the place and date of birth of Poška were unknown. His year of birth was subject to varied speculations that ranged from 1745 to 1775. In 2004, historian Povilas Šverebas discovered Poška's baptismal records of the Žemalė church. He was born in the Lėlaičiai manor between Telšiai and Mažeikiai in a family of petty Samogitian gentry and was baptized in Žemalė on 13 October 1764. He was the son of Adam Paszkiewicz and his first wife Bogumiła Wisztortówna. His childhood passed at his parents' estate in Maldūnai (Šilalė district). Between 1773 and 1780, Poška studied in Kražiai College. Later he studied law at the barrister's and until 1821 held various offices at the courts. In 1786 Poška became a lawyer. From 1790 till his death Poška lived in a small estate of his own in Bardžiai (Raseiniai district) near Bijotai, where he possessed around 500 ha of land and had 40 serfs. In 1792, Poška married Uršulė Sasnauskytė. They had no children.

Poška was actively corresponding with professors of Vilnius University, bishops, poets, writers and other cultural figures of Lithuania. Poška died in 1830 and was buried in Kaltinėnai cemetery (Šilalė district municipality) near his wife.

== Baublys ==
Poška was a person of wide interests. He knew Lithuanian (native Samogitian dialect), Polish, Latin, Ancient Greek and other languages. His special interest laid in the past of Lithuanian nation, its language, spiritual and material culture. Poška collected ancient artifacts from archaeological excavations, military arms of the times of the Grand Duchy of Lithuania, Lithuanian coins, medals and other rarities. A library of rare Lithuanian-language books was too collected by Poška.

At the beginning of the 19th century Poška cut down an oak, that was growing in his estate, when the oak began to dry up and hollowed its trunk thus making a hut for the collection of his antiquities, that was called by Poška himself – Baublys (Baublys in Lithuanian means someone or something, who/that make a low roar, rumble), because of a characteristic sound when the wind was blowing through this trunk. In 1812 in this carved oak tree he established the first historical museum in Lithuania. Later more old oak trunks were carved for the collection of Poška to store.

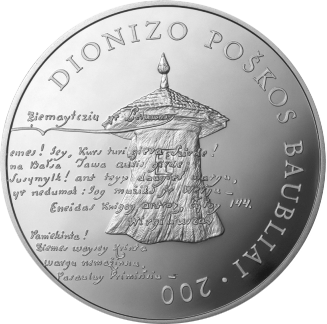
50 litų coin commemorating the 200th anniversary of Poška's Baublys, 2012.

This museum soon became widely known not only in Lithuania, but also abroad and played an important role in encouraging Lithuanian nobility and the rest of Lithuanians to study the past of Lithuania. Today Baublys is a working museum, that depicts one of many initiatives of Lithuanian nobility during the Romanticism period when the interest in the history of Lithuania was growing. Poška was one of the first Lithuanian nobles who felt interested in various Lithuanian antiquities.

== Literary work ==
Poška was writing in his native Lithuanian and in a nobility language of the time – Polish language. During his lifetime, he himself did not publish much or tried to preserve his writings, thus part of his works and translations were lost. His literary heritage consists mostly of historical, philological and fictional works.

Poška was collecting historical books in the Lithuanian language and wrote his own works on the Lithuanian past, language, ethnography and mythology. From 1825 to his death he was working on a trilingual Polish–Latin–Lithuanian dictionary. The unfinished dictionary consists of more than 25,000 words. The last entry is sanie (sled).

The fiction works of Poška vary in form: they consist of long poems as well as short epigrams. The most famous literary work of Poška is "The Peasant of Samogitia and Lithuania", which was written by him during a ten-year span between 1815 and 1825.

Today Poška is respected in Lithuania not only as a creator of the first Lithuanian historical museum and one of the first poets, who wrote in Lithuanian language, but also as one of the initiators of the early 19th-century informal Lithuanian cultural movement to revive the Lithuanian culture and Lithuanian language, the so-called Samogitian-Lithuanian revival (Žemaitiškas lietuvškasis sąjūdis).

Poška also coined some neologisms, that are still used in Lithuanian language and was making the first attempts at standardisation of the Lithuanian language.

== Bibliography ==
- Majoch, Sławomir (2020). "Komentarz". Muzeum w kulturze pamięcina ziemiach Rzeczpospolitej Obojga Narodów. Antologia wczesnych tekstów 1766-1882.
