= Birutė Dominauskaitė =

Soviet and Lithuanian basketball player (born 1973)

Personal information
- Born: April 16, 1973 (age 53) Šiauliai, Lithuanian SSR, Soviet Union

Career history
- 2000: Vilniaus TEO
- 2000 - 2008: ŁKS Łódź
- 2009 - 2012: Šiaulių Rūta

Birutė Dominauskaitė (born April 16, 1973) is a former Soviet and Lithuanian female professional basketball player.
