= Beirut (art space) =

Beirut was a non-profit art institution that was founded in Giza, Egypt in 2012. It was registered as Goldin + Senneby LLC in Cairo, Egypt. The art space closed in 2015.

== Overview ==
Beirut was an art initiative and exhibition space founded by Sarah Rifky and Jens Maier Rothe as a space that considers institution building as a curatorial act. The institution’s activities were centered around hosting artists, artworks, research projects and other institutions engaging with similar questions of politics, economy, education, ecology and the arts. The art space was established in a late 1940s three-story villa surrounded by a little garden in the neighborhood of Agouza, Giza. Beirut was initiated in the aftermath of the Egyptian uprising, examining the space of art during this insurgent time. It closed in 2015 following tightening security and decreased support.

== The Imaginary School Program ==
tISP was an eight-month cross-disciplinary practice and theory based program initiated by Beirut in 2014. The program directed by Antonia Alampi, comprised a series of workshops, lectures, field trips and reading groups focused on the notion of instituting and organizing. Participants looked at collectives, non-movements, informal groups and non-governmental civic and cultural organizations in Cairo. tISP was designed in response too surge of new initiatives, collectives and institutions founded in Cairo following the 2011 uprising, taking a critical and investigative look at alternative civic infrastructures.

== Exhibitions ==
- 2014, Adelita Husni-Bey, "White Paper: The Land"
- 2014, Kadist Art Foundation, "A Guest Without A Host is a Ghost: The Exhibition"
- 2014, Danh Vo, "Photographs of Dr. Joseph M. Carrier 1962-1973"
- 2014, Lawrence Abu Hamdan, "Tape Echo"
- 2014, Malak Helmy, "Lost Referents of Some Attraction"
- 2013, "Unexpected Encounters" with Malak Helmy, Hassan Khan, Jasmina Metwaly and Mada Masr
- 2013, "Writing with the other hand is imaging"
- 2013, "You Only Fall Twice" with CCA Derry-Londonderry
- 2013 "The Falling of the Books…" with FormContent
- 2013 "The Magic of the State" with Lisson Gallery
- 2013 Azin Faizabadi, "A Collective Memory"
- 2013 Joe Namy, "(a(version)s)"
- 2012 "What Does a Drawing Want?"
- 2012 "Global Slum" by Maryam Jafri
