= Simonas Stanevičius =

Lithuanian writer

Simonas Tadas Stanevičius
- Born: 26 October 1799; Kanopėnai, Russian Empire
- Died: 10 March 1848 (aged 48); Stemplės, Russian Empire
- Education: Vilnius University
- Occupation: Writer
- Movement: Lithuanian National Revival

Simonas Tadas Stanevičius (Polish: Szymon Tadeusz Staniewicz; 26 October 1799 – 10 March 1848) was a Lithuanian writer and an activist of the "Samogitian Revival", an early stage of the Lithuanian National Revival.

== Biography ==
Born to a family of petty nobles, as a son of Stanisław Staniewicz and Barbara Rymkiewicz. Stanevičius studied at the Jesuit gymnasium in Kražiai from 1817 to 1821. For a year he worked in Kražiai as a private teacher, before enrolling into the Art and Literature Department of Vilnius University. There he was influenced by democratic ideas of professors such as Joachim Lelewel and Ignacy Onacewicz. Stanevičius joined a cultural movement to promote the Lithuanian language. After graduation in 1826, he stayed in Vilnius, working as a private tutor and preparing his works for publication. In 1829, he published three of his works (a grammar book, collection of folk songs, and his fables). Stanevičius then moved to Raseiniai and lived in the Plater estate, managing their private library. During the Uprising of 1831, Stanevičius traveled to Königsberg where he met with Ludwig Rhesa and collected materials for future publications. After the death of his patron Jerzy Plater in 1836, Stanevičius moved to the estate of Jerzy's brother Kazimierz Plater in Stemplės. There Stanevičius continued to care for the 3,000-piece library until his death from tuberculosis in 1848.

== Works ==
In 1829, inspired by Johann Gottfried Herder, Stanevičius published Dainos žemaičių (Songs of the Samogitians), a sample of 30 of the most artistic and valuable Samogitian folk songs from his 150-song collection. Four years later he published an addendum (Pažymės žemaitiškos gaidos) with melodies for these songs.

He is best remembered for the publication of Šešios pasakos (Six Fables), a book of six fables and ode Žemaičių šlovė (The Samogitians' Glory) written by Stanevičius himself. Two fables borrowed plots from Aesop and the other four mixed the author's own ideas with Samogitian folklore. The most important fables are Aitvarai (a type of household spirit in Lithuanian mythology) and Arklys ir meška (The Horse and the Bear – symbols of the Aukštaitians and Samogitians respectively) as they depict the worldview, values, and culture of everyday Samogitian peasants. Stanevičius lived in an era of rising Romanticism, but his works are more Realistic due to his close contacts with the peasantry. The ode, the first example of this genre in the Lithuanian language, celebrated growing interest in the Lithuanian language and history at Vilnius University.

Towards the end of his life, Stanevičius took an academic interest in the Lithuanian language, history, and mythology. His unfinished manuscript, written in Polish, on Lithuanian history was titled: Wyjaśnienie Mythologii Litewskiej, zawartej w dziełach Hartknocha, Stryjkowskiego, Łasickiego, tudzież w słownikach litewskich Szyrwida, Ruhiga i Mieleckiego. Przez Szymona Staniewicz Kolleg. Sekretarza. It was partially published only in 1893 and fully in 1967, but is significant as the first critical history of Lithuania and first scholarly analysis of the Lithuanian mythology. In contrast to Dionizas Poška or Simonas Daukantas, who searched for glorious and idealized history, Stanevičius carefully studied, validated, and cited his sources, remaining truthful to the facts, and was not afraid to reject romantic legends. He heavily criticized Teodor Narbutt and Maciej Stryjkowski as inaccurate. Stanevičius debunked many of the romantic legends, especially in the area of Lithuanian mythology, including the romantic notion of the ancient Romuva temple and connections drawn between Roman gods and Lithuanian gods.
