= Casco (Utrecht) =

Casco Art Institute: Working for the Commons
- Formation: 1990
- Type: Non-profit organization
- Location: Lange Nieuwstraat 7 Utrecht, The Netherlands
- Artistic Director: Aline Hernández
- Executive Director: Marianna Takou
- Website: casco.art

Casco Art Institute: Working for the Commons is a non-profit public art institution based in Utrecht, Netherlands.

== Overview ==
Casco was founded in 1990 as an experimental art space on the Oudegracht in Utrecht. In 1995 it was renamed Casco Projects, starting a program with a focus on autonomy and intervention. In 2003, Casco took a new title 'Office for Art, Design and Theory' to expand its framework to artistic research and interdisciplinary practices. In 2007, the institute moved to a new location on the Nieuwekade, designed by ifau (institute for applied urbanism) and Jesko Fezer. In 2014 Casco moved to a new space on the Lange Nieuwstraat in Utrecht. 2018 marked another transitional year accompanied by the name change to Casco Art Institute: Working for the Commons.

== Past projects ==
- 2018 Elephants in The Room: Assembly for commoning institutions
- 2018 Biannual exhibition program: Alma Heikkilä, "Evolved in shared relationships" and The Outsiders "Erfgoed (Agricultural Heritage and Land Use)"
- 2017 Doria Garía and Ingo Niermann "Army of Love", and Heman Chong and Renée Staal, "The Library of Unread Books"
- 2016 Alex Martinis Roe, "To Become Two"
- 2016 Wok The Rock, "Parasite Lottery"
- 2015 Group Exhibition: "We Are the Time Machines: Time and Tools for Commoning"
- 2015 Adelita Husni-Bey, "White Paper: The Law" and Fernano Garcìa-Dory, "INLAND"
- 2014 Melanie Gilligan, "The Common Sense" and The Otolith Group, "In the Year of the Quiet Sun"
- 2014 Wendelien van Oldenborgh receives prestigious Dr AH Heiniken Prize for Art
- 2014 Inaugural Exhibition, "New Habits"
- 2013 Tadasu Takamine, "Japan Syndrome - Utrecht Version"
- 2012 Lawrence Abu Hamdan, "Aural Contract: The Whole Truth"
- 2009-2010 "User's Manual: The Grand Domestic Revolution", long-term "living research",
- 2010 Ei Arakawa, "Hurt Locker Instruments"
- 2010 Martha Rosler, "If you Lived Here Still..."
- 2009 Metahaven, "Stadtstaadt. A Scenario for Merging Cities"
- 2008 Fritz Haeg, "Animal Estates 6.0"
- 2008 Ricardo Basbaum, "Re-projecting (Utrecht)"
- 2008 Stephen Willats, "The Speculative Diagram"
- 2007 Dave Hullfish Bailey, "What's left for its own devices (on reclamation)"
- 2007 Annette Krauss, "Hidden Curriculum"

== Publications ==
- 1996 Casco Issues 1: Good & Bad
- 1997 Casco Issues 2: Parallel Worlds
- 1997 Casco Issues 3
- 1998 Casco Issues 4: The black-and-white issue
- 1999 Casco Issues 5: Real Experiments
- 2007 The So-called Utopia
- 2007 Hidden Curriculum Files, Annette Krauss
- 2011 A Well Respected Man, Van Oldenborgh, Wendelien, in collaboration with Sternberg Press
- 2014 The Grand Domestic Revolution Handbook

== See also ==
- List of contemporary art spaces in the Netherlands
