= Technasium =

Stream of secondary education in the Netherlands

Technasium is a stream in the secondary educational system of the Netherlands. It can be chosen by VWO and HAVO students. Scientific subjects form the basis of this teaching method. It can be compared to grammar school, which includes the subjects Latin and Greek. Technasium, however, includes the examination subject “Research and Design” (Dutch: "Onderzoeken en Ontwerpen"). Students can start this course from the first year to the fourth year of high school. Schools are recommended to schedule about 4–6 hours of Research and Design class a week, but this may vary among different high schools. In the first three years, the course is optional and is an addition to the standard curriculum. To prevent the students from having too many study-hours, the schools are free to drop certain other subjects. After the third form, Research and Design becomes a supplementary course, which students can choose within their study program.

== History ==
Technasium was started as a project in 2004 by Judith Lechner and Boris Wanders at five different schools in the Dutch province of Groningen. Due to a lot of interest from other schools in the Netherlands, this project has developed into a form of education. Technasium can be attended in around sixty schools in the Netherlands, and is still developing, especially the subject Onderzoeken en Ontwerpen.

== Research and Design ==
A part of Technasium is the subject Research and Design. This subject can be taught starting from the first class of pre-university education or HAVO (higher general continued education). It is possible to start the course at a later stage, when choosing the courses to follow in the last three years of high school. A couple of projects are done each year within the O&O course. The Technasium education course mostly works with practical assignments, commissioned by real companies. These companies ask the students to design something, to do research on a certain topic or to think of solutions for problems they are struggling with. The students present their findings at the end of the project. Often, these projects are composed for a group of students. The number of students depends on the assignment and varies, but is mostly from two to four students. It is up to the teacher to decide who forms the groups. It's either the teacher himself who does, or the students can try to form groups with their classmates. Working together in a team is of major importance and the students learn to do this from the start.

In the first three years, four technasium projects are done each year. An assignment has to be finished in 7 or 8 weeks, with 5 to 6 hours of O&O a week. In the pre-senior year, students get to choose two projects. They look for a company or institution which wants them to undertake a project from within the company. In the final year, the students will take their Mastertest. The students can once again decide what kind of project they like to do. Students have to spend 40 hours of work on a normal project, and 200 hours on the Mastertest.

== TTA: Technasium Top Award ==
Each year, a national project for the second-year students is launched, with which they can win a big prize. This competition is called the Technasium Top Award. The event is hosted once a year and can be watched live on-stream. Each group of students gets to show and present their design. The jury decides which design wins the competition at the end of the day. A lot of technical systems and designs are on show during the day. The Idea of the Technasium Top Award is to activate children's interest in science. Their mindset is as following: “Participating is always more important than winning”. In 2013 the subject of the competition was “saving time in case of fire”. The aim was to think of ways to make escaping from fire easier for the disabled. In 2014, the assignment was to design and build an energy neutral building in Dronten. In 2015, CAH Vilentum demands an energy-producing building in Almere. They want the students to base their ideas on the solutions nature has been giving for millions of year, the biomimicry. Another goal they would like to achieve is getting the building to be a part of a cradle to cradle system. This means that every part of the building can, and probably will be, recycled in the future. Winners of the Technasium Top Award 2015: 1. Calandlyceum, Amsterdam 2. Melanchthon, Bergschenhoek 3. Cals College, Nieuwegein
