= Birutė Ciplijauskaitė =

Lithuanian literary scholar and translator

Birutė Ciplijauskaitė (11 April 1929 in Kaunas – 19 June 2017) was a Lithuanian literary scholar and translator. She is considered one of the greatest Hispanists in American academia in the twentieth century.

The daughter of physician and gynecologist, director of Klaipėda hospital, she attended Kaunas Conservatory and fled Lithuania during World War II. She graduated from the University of Tübingen in 1956 and then the University of Montreal. She received her PhD in Spanish and French from Bryn Mawr College in 1960. Her dissertation, that she wrote under the supervision of Spanish philosopher Jose Ferrater Mora, explored the topic of 'soledad' in twentieth-century Spanish poetry.

Ciplijauskaitė taught Spanish at the University of Wisconsin–Madison from 1960 until 2000, and was a professor from 1968. Ciplijauskaitė has been an adviser for the Lithuanian-American cultural journal Lituanus.

== Bibliography ==
- La soledad en el destierro, Ínsula, 1962
- La soledad y la poesía española contemporánea, Ínsula, 1963
- El poeta y la poesía: del romanticismo a la poesía social, Ínsula, 1966
- (ed.) Luis de Góngora y Argote, Sonetos completos, Castalia, 1968
- Baroja, un estilo, Ínsula, 1972
- Deber de plenitud, la poesía de Jorge Guillén, Secretaría de educación pública, 1973
- Birutė Ciplijauskaitė (ed.), Jorge Guillén, Taurus, 1975
- Birutė Ciplijauskaitė (ed.), Homenaje a Juan Ramón Jiménez, Fundación Universitaria Española, seminario "Ménendez Pelayo, 1982
- Los Noventayochistas y la historia, J. Porrúa Turanzas, 1981
- La mujer insatisfecha : el adulterio en la novela realista, Edhasa, 1984
- Juegos de duplicación e inversión en "La Celestina", Gredos, 1988
- La novela femenina contemporánea 1970-1985 : hacia una tipología de la narración en primera persona, Anthropos, 1988
- Birutė Ciplijauskaitė (ed.), La voluntad de humanismo: homenaje a Juan Marichal, Anthropos, 1990
- Birutė Ciplijauskaitė (ed.), Novísimos, postnovísimos, clásicos: la poesía de los 80 en España, Orígenes, 1991
- Vingt poètes lituaniens d'aujourd'hui, Éditions du Petit Véhicule, 1997
- De signos y significaciones. 1 : poetas del 27, Anthropos, 1999
- Carmen Martín Gaite (1925-2000), Ediciones del Orto, 2000
- La construcción del yo femenino en la literatura, Universidad de Cádiz. Servicio de publicaciones, 2004
