= Kražiai College =

Jesuit college in Lithuania (1616–1844)

Coordinates: 55°36′21″N 22°41′21″E

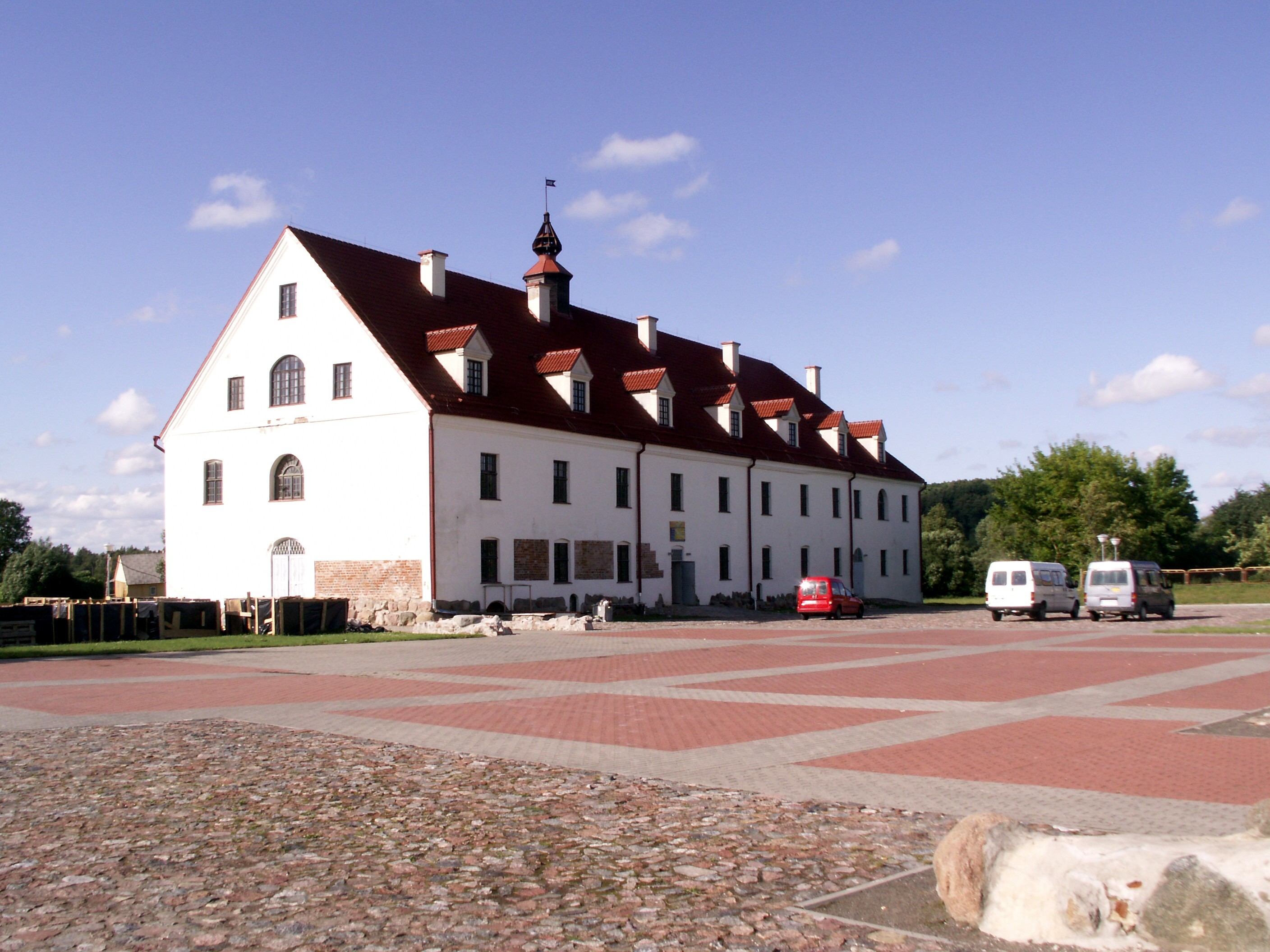
Reconstructed former student dormitory of Kražiai College in 2008

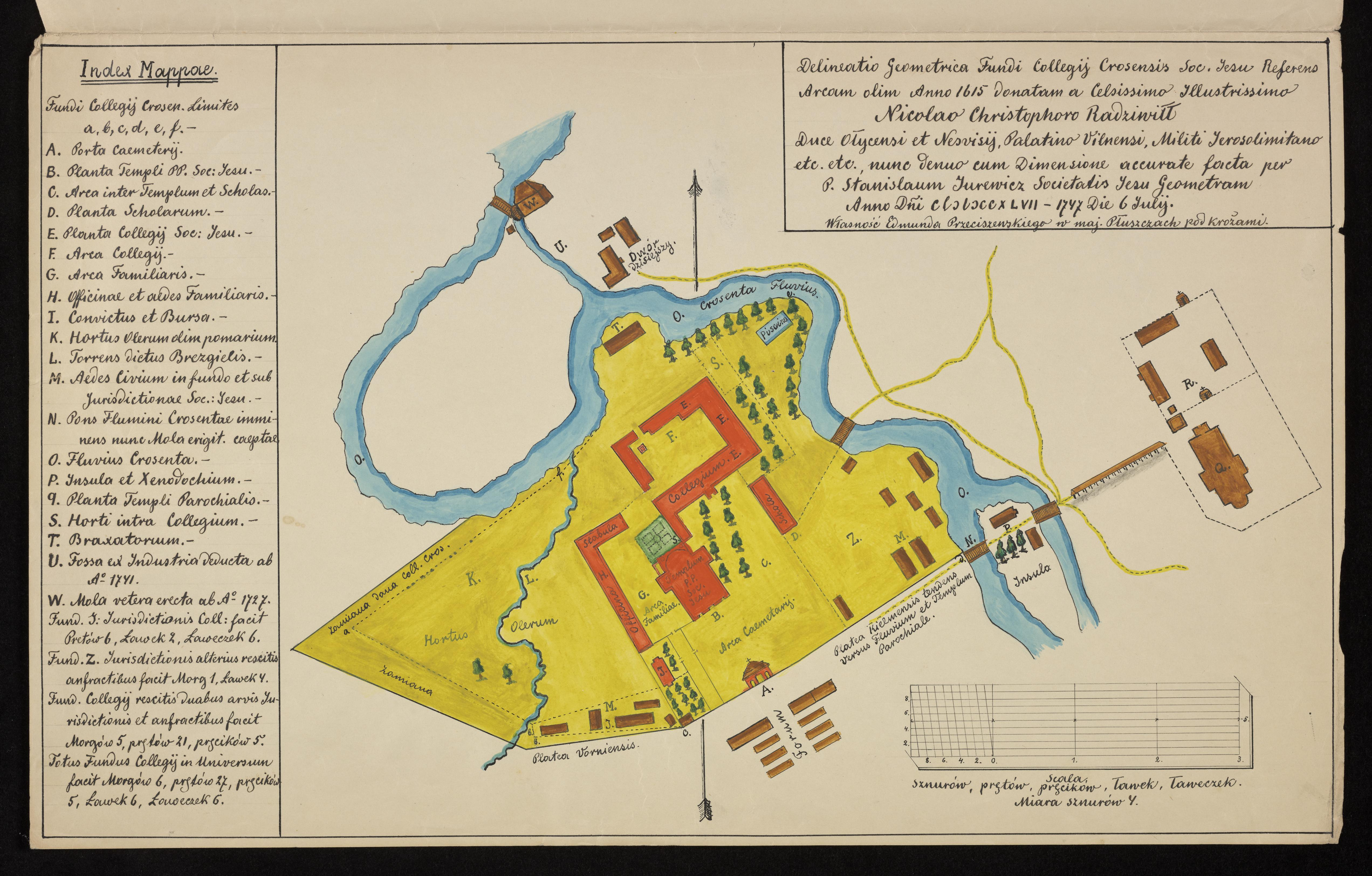
Plan of the Jesuit College by Michał Eustachy Brensztejn

The Kražiai College (Latin: Collegium Crozensis) was a Jesuit college (equivalent to a modern secondary school) in Kražiai, Grand Duchy of Lithuania and later Russian Empire. Established in 1616 in hopes to educate new generations of anti-Protestants, the college was one of the major cultural and educational centers in Samogitia. In 1620–1742, it shared premises with the Samogitian Priest Seminary. In 1844, the college was transferred to Kaunas.

== History ==
=== Establishment ===
Bishop Merkelis Giedraitis raised the idea of establishing a college in Kražiai, the first higher education institution in Samogitia. To that end, in 1608, he invited the Jesuits, bought them land and built a house for their needs. Merkelis died the following year; in his last will, he left money and land for the construction of a Jesuit monastery. Other patrons included Mikołaj Krzysztof Radziwiłł the Orphan who donated a castle, built in 1565, and Jan Karol Chodkiewicz who donated seven homesteads. The college was founded in 1613, and was called Collegium Chodkievicianum in honor of Chodkiewicz. Chodkiewicz also began construction of the Church of the Assumption of the Blessed Virgin Mary in 1621.

It was the second Jesuit college in Lithuania (after Vilnius Jesuit College). The first class was held only in September 1616 in a temporary wooden house. In 1616, the Kražiai College was reorganized into a college with three compulsory classes: grammar, poetics and rhetoric. The construction of a permanent school began in 1618 (the ceremony of laying the cornerstone was attended by Grand Treasurer Hieronim Wołłowicz). At the time, the college already had about 50 students and 12 teachers.

=== Growth and reorganizations ===
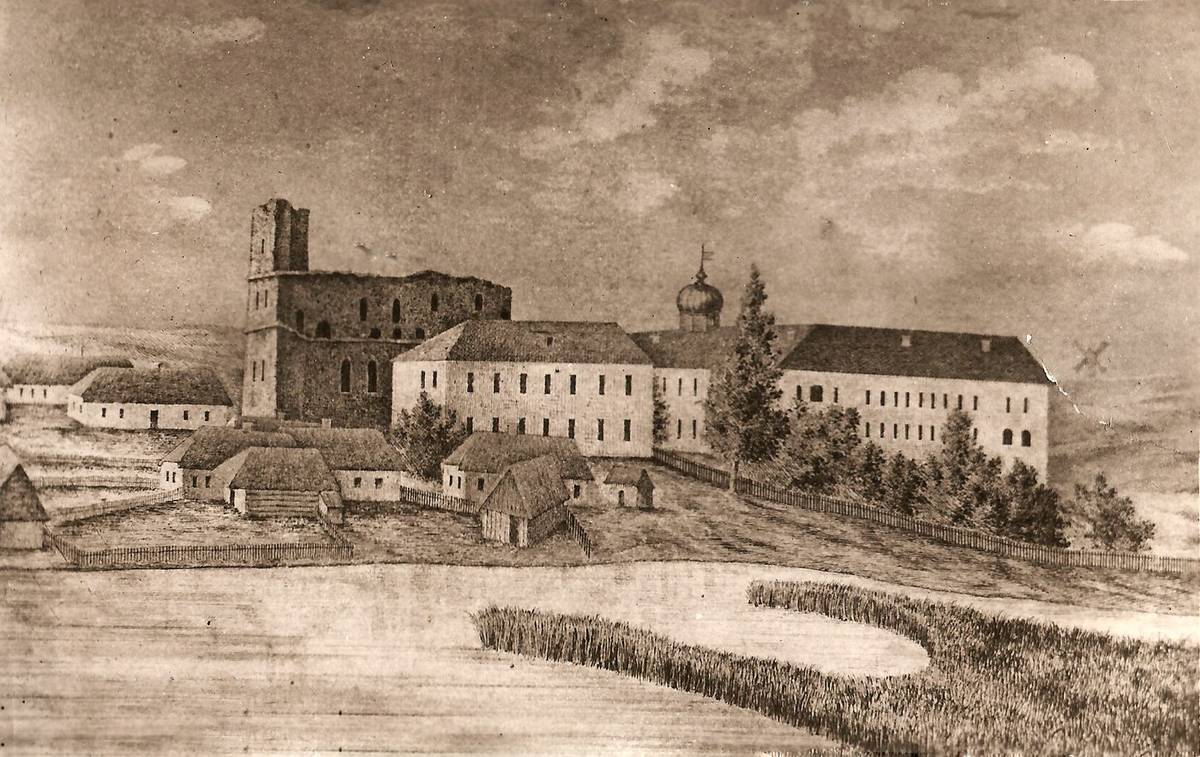
Kražiai College in 1840

Gradually, with the support of many wealthy sponsors, the college expanded into a large campus, including its own church built in 1625–89. Full financial support was given to 26 impoverished students. On average, the school employed 30–50 Jesuits and educated 250–300 students. The curriculum and teaching methods followed the Ratio Studiorum. Students belonged to the Sodality of Our Lady and visited the sick. The college had its own student theater (30 performances are known) and a rich library, which in 1803 held 3,264 volumes (oldest dating back to 1427). In 1729, a course in philosophy was introduced, as a result of which the school began to be called an athenaeum.

The church begun by Chodkiewicz was not consecrated until 1689 and was one of the largest in Samogitia. The main altar was said to have contained Leonardo da Vinci’s painting The Assumption of the Virgin.

The college suffered severe human and capital losses during the Swedish invasion of 1656 and the plague of 1710, but recovered. After the suppression of the Jesuits in 1773, the college's administration was taken over by the Commission of National Education. After the Third Partition of the Polish–Lithuanian Commonwealth, Carmelites from Kolainiai administered the school from 1797 to 1817. In 1817, Tsarist authorities secularized the school, changed its name to gymnasium, introduced primary education classes, and transferred its administration to Vilnius University. As such, the number of students grew and exceeded 400.

=== Move to Kaunas ===
Vilnius University was closed in the aftermath of the 1831 November Uprising. After the establishment of the Kovno Governorate in 1843, the gymnasium was transferred from Kražiai to Kaunas (the present-day Maironis Gymnasium). The church, which had not been repaired, fell into ruin and was sold by the Russian government to Adolf Przeciszewski in 1842. The campus in Kražiai was abandoned and fell into ruins. Only the former student dormitory (bursa) survives to this day. The building was extensively renovated in 2008 and houses the Cultural Center of Maciej Kazimierz Sarbiewski, Kražiai Region Museum, and the library and art collection of Charlotte Narkiewicz-Laine.

== Teachers and students ==
The first teacher, Jonas Kochas, was sent from the Collegium Hosianum in Royal Prussia. Among the first teachers was poet Maciej Kazimierz Sarbiewski who taught syntax. Other notable teachers included historian Albert Wijuk Kojałowicz who taught rhetoric, Adam Krupski taught philosophy in 1740–1742, Žygimantas Liauksminas (Sigismundus Lauxmin) who was also college's rector, historia Karol Wyrwicz, and future Bishop Motiejus Valančius. Notable students included writers Dionizas Poška and Simonas Stanevičius, folklorists Liudvikas Adomas Jucevičius, explorers Jan Prosper Witkiewicz, brothers Antanas and Jonas Juška.

== See also ==
- List of Jesuit sites

== Bibliography ==
- Załęski, Stanisław (1904). "Kolegia i domy założone w pierwszej dobie rządów Zygmunta III 1588–1608" [Colleges and Houses Founded During the First Period of the Reign of Sigismund III, 1588–1608]. Jezuici w Polsce [Jesuits in Poland] (in Polish). Vol. 4 (part 2). Kraków: Drukiem i nakładem Drukarni W. L. Anczyca i Sp.
