= Birutė Nedzinskienė =

Lithuanian politician

Birutė Nedzinskienė (4 December 1955 – 24 August 1994) was a Lithuanian politician, born in Inta, Komi ASSR. In 1990 she was among those who signed the Act of the Re-Establishment of the State of Lithuania.
