= Marshal of Nobility (Poland) =

The Marshal of Nobility (Polish: Marszałek szlachty) was an institution of self-government of the nobility (szlachta) in the Polish–Lithuanian Commonwealth which existed in Polish lands acquired by the Russian Empire during the First Partition of Poland in 1772. The term is the Polish translation of the Russian term "Предводитель дворянства (predvoditel dvoryanstva)", literally, "leader of nobility", where the word "Marszałek" is a historical title used in the Polish–Lithuanian Commonwealth for various functions.

Initially it was a position elected by szlachta, however after the Polish January Uprising of 1863 it was appointed by the governor (who himself was appointed by Russian tsar).
