= Binna Choi =

South Korean curator

- Born: 1977 (age 48–49)
- Occupation: Curator

Korean name
- Hangul: 최빛나
- RR: Choe Bitna
- MR: Ch'oe Pinna

Binna Choi (born 1977) is a South Korean curator and the director of Casco Art Institute: Working for the Commons.

== Education and career ==
Choi completed her curatorial studies at the De Appel in Amsterdam 2004, after graduation she joined BAK, basis voor actuele kunst in Utrecht as a curator until She joined Casco Art Institute: Working for the Commons in 2008 as a director. Choi has been part of the faculty of the Dutch Art Institute / Masters of Fine Arts Program in Arnhem and is a founding member of Electric Palm Tree.

== Publications ==
- 2014 Grand Domestic Revolution Handbook (editor)
- 2011 Casco Issues XII: Generous Structures (author)
- 2011 Circular Facts (editor)
- 2015 Cluster: Dialectionary (co-author)

== See also ==
- Casco Art Institute: Working for the Commons
