= Michał Wiszniewski =

Polish philosopher, psychologist and literary historian

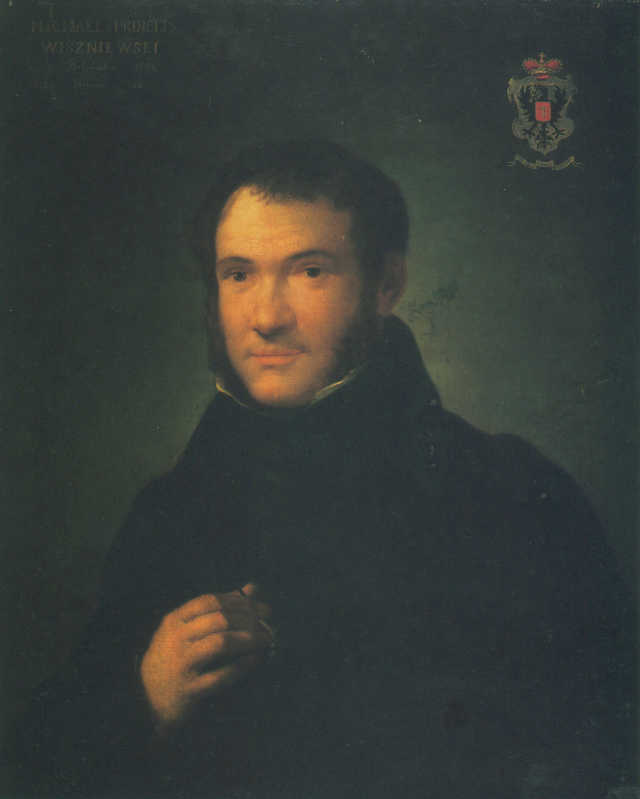
Michał Wiszniewski. Portrait by Rafał Hadziewicz

Michał Wiszniewski (27 September 1794 – 22 December 1865) was a Polish philosopher, psychologist, and literary historian.

== Life ==
Wiszniewski graduated from the celebrated Krzemieniec Lyceum (secondary school), where he subsequently taught for a time.

In 1831 he became a professor at Kraków's Jagiellonian University. He was a conservative activist during the Kraków Uprising of 1846. In 1848 he emigrated to Italy.

Wiszniewski was an epigone of the Polish Enlightenment, and at the same time a precursor of Positivism.

He authored a pioneering book on Characters of Human Minds, which is regarded as the first Polish work in the field of psychology.

== Works ==
- Bacona metoda tłumaczenia natury (Bacon's Method of Explaining Nature; 1834)
- Charaktery rozumów ludzkich (Characters of Human Minds; 1837, English edition 1853
- O rozumie ludzkim (On the Human Mind; 1848)
- Historia literatury polskiej (A History of Polish Literature; vols. 1–10, 1840–57)

== See also ==
- History of philosophy in Poland
- List of Poles
