= Juozapas Arnulfas Giedraitis =

Lithuanian clergyman and writer (1757–1838)

Bishop of Samogitia Juozapas Arnulfas Giedraitis
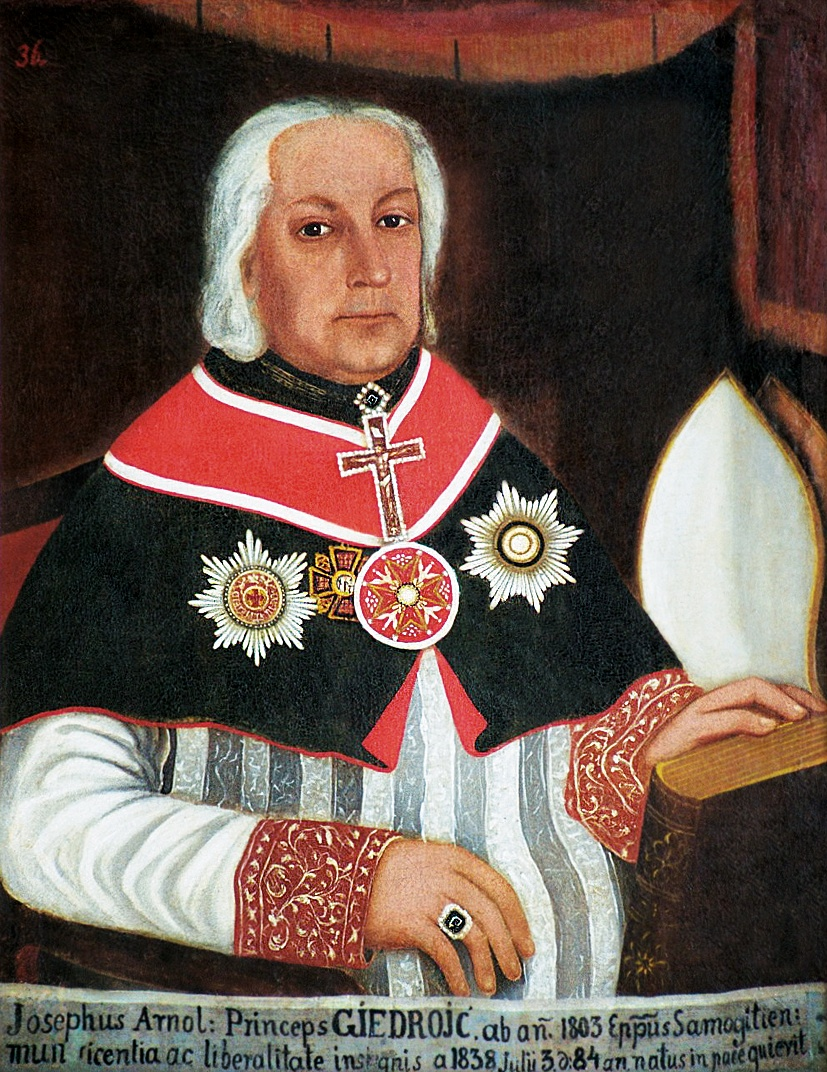
- Juozapas Arnulfas Giedraitis
- Church: Roman Catholic Church
- See: Samogitia
- Appointed: 13 May 1802
- Predecessor: Jan Stefan Giedroyć
- Successor: Szymon Mikołaj Giedroyć
- Previous post: Titular Bishop of Orthosias in Caria (1791–1802)

Orders
- Ordination: 24 January 1781 by Bishop Jan Stefan Giedroyć
- Consecration: 19 June 1791

Personal details
- Born: 24 June 1757 Kamaraučizna, Grand Duchy of Lithuania, Polish–Lithuanian Commonwealth
- Died: 5 July 1838 (aged 81) Alsėdžiai, Russian Empire
- Buried: Church of St. Peter and St. Paul in Varniai (Note: Giedraitis' heart was embedded in the wall of the presbytery of the Church of St. Bartholomew in Giedraičiai.)
- Education: Samogitian Seminary
- Coat of arms

Juozapas Arnulfas Giedraitis (Polish: Józef Arnulf Giedroyć; 24 June 1757 – 5 July 1838) was a Lithuanian clergyman, translator, writer, and a key figure of the early Lithuanian National Revival. Giedraitis earned a Doctorate of Canon Law in 1790, and became the Bishop of Samogitia in 1803. He was chairman of the Lithuanian Educational Commission from 1797. Giedraitis was the first to translate the full New Testament into Lithuanian in 1816. The Samogitian Revival that he began lead to the broader Lithuanian National Revival.

== Biography ==
=== Early life and education ===
Giedraitis was descended from the Lithuanian princely Giedroyć family. His father Jonas was a captain in the Grand Ducal Lithuanian Army. He studied at the College of Nobility in Vilnius. At the age of 23, Giedraitis graduated in 1780 from the Samogitian Seminary in Varniai, and as a cleric he was already appointed a Livonian canon.

=== Priesthood and European travels ===
He was ordained a deacon on 6 January 1781, and a priest a few weeks later on 24 January. From 1781 to 1785, Giedraitis traveled around Europe, spending the longest time in Rome. He traveled through the Italian states and the Kingdom of France, spending a year in Paris, and returned to his homeland via the Netherlands and Germany.

From 1785, he was a member of the chapter of the Samogitian diocese. In 1788, he became a prelate archdeacon. In 1789, he was awarded the Order of Saint Stanislaus by King Stanisław August Poniatowski. In 1790, he was made a Doctor of Canon Law. He was chosen as a coadjutor bishop with the right of inheritance on 4 December 1790, and then confirmed on 11 April 1791. As coadjutor bishop, he was a member of the confederation of the Four-Year Sejm. He was also appointed the titular bishop of Orthosias in Caria on 11 April, and then ordained on 19 June.

After the third partition of Poland–Lithuania in 1795, he was elected delegate of the Duchy of Samogitia and went on a mission to the Empress of Russia Catherine II. As a token of her appreciation, she presented him with a diamond cross.

=== Bishop of Samogitia ===
From 13 May 1802, Giedraitis was the Bishop of Samogitia. However, he had already practically ruled the diocese from 1801.

He moved the diocese's general consistory from Alsėdžiai to Varniai, and lived in Alsėdžiai himself. He took great care of the education of priests and parochial schools, so that by the 1820s, more than 70% of parishes in the Samogitian diocese operated them. Due to these schools, he maintained relations with Vilnius University. Giedraitis took care of the development of the Lithuanian language, communicated with writers, and patronized Lithuanian literary figures.

At the request of Tsar Alexander I, he participated in the work of the Biblical Committee operating in St. Petersburg since 1813.

During the uprising of 1831, he urged Lithuanians and Samogitians to support the insurgents and assigned chaplains to their units. After it was suppressed, he was removed from direct control of the diocese by the Russian administration.

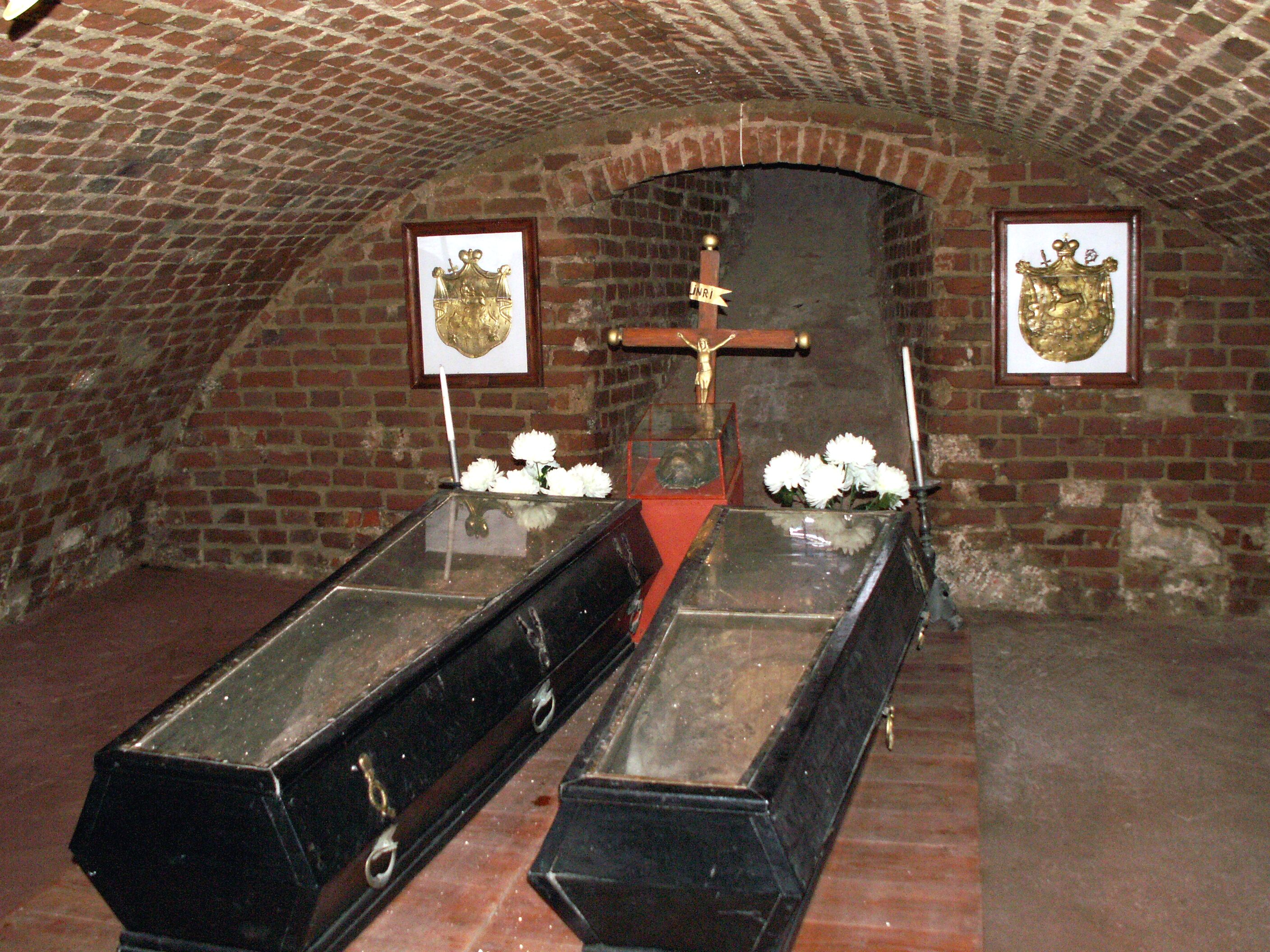
Sarcophagi of the Samogitian bishops Giedraičiai in the basement of the Church of St. Peter and Paul in Varnian

In 1800s, with the help of Dionizas Poška, he translated Italian poetry (the prologue to Torquato Tasso's drama Aminta, published in 1965). On his initiative, the Gospels were edited and published in 1806. At the request of the Bible Society that he was in, he wrote the study On the Lithuanian Nation, Language and Literature (published in 1994). His most important work is the first translation into Lithuanian of the entire text of the New Testament for Catholics (1816, 2nd ed. 1906). His translation contributed to the formation of the common Lithuanian language.

In 1832, after the uprising was suppressed, he translated from Polish a short catechism prepared by Bishop Andrius Klongevičius on the subjects' respect for the Tsar.

== Legacy ==
The Russian historian Alexander Polovtsov wrote about Juozapas Arnulfas Giedraitis that he was:

one of the most remarkable Lithuanian figures. When Lithuania came under Russian rule, he taught by word and example that spiritual and intellectual activity and public education in Lithuania should come from educated Lithuanians. Until his death, he was occupied with finding means to educate the Samogitian people: he founded parish schools, district schools, and gymnasiums.

== Awards ==
- Awarded the Order of Saint Stanislaus by King Stanisław August Poniatowski in 1789.
- Awarded the Order of Saint Anna, 1st degree, in 1829.

== See also ==
- Bible translations into Lithuanian

== Bibliography ==
- Yla, Stasys (1973). "Juozas Arnulfas Giedraitis: Tautinio žemaičių sąjūdžio vadas" [Juozas Arnulfas Giedraitis: Leader of the Samogitian National Revival]. Vardai ir veidai: Mūsų kultūros istorijoje [Names and Faces: In Our Culture's History] (PDF) (in Lithuanian). Chicago: Lietuviškos knygos klubas.
- Prašmantaitė, Aldona (2000). Žemaičių vyskupas Juozapas Arnulfas Giedraitis (in Lithuanian). Vilnius: Diemedis.
- Prašmantaitė, Aldona (2004). "Juozapas Arnulfas Giedraitis". Visuotinė lietuvių enciklopedija (in Lithuanian). Vol. VI (Fau-Goris). Vilnius: Mokslo ir enciklopedijų leidybos institutas. p. 638.
- Kamińska, Janina (2012). Universitas Vilnensis 1793–1803: Od Szkoły Głównej Wielkiego Księstwa Litewskiego do Imperatorskiego Uniwersytetu Wileńskiego [Universitas Vilnensis 1793–1803: From the Main School of the Grand Duchy of Lithuania to the Imperial University of Vilnius] (PDF) (in Polish). Warszawa: Wydawnictwa Uniwersytetu Warszawskiego. ISBN 978-83-235-0893-9.
- Zawadzki, Piotr (1791). Kalendarzyk Narodowy y Obcy na Rok Pański 1792 (in Polish). Warszawa.
- Polovtsov, Alexander (1914). "Гедройц, Иосиф Арнольд" [Gedroyts, Iosif Arnold]. Russian Biographical Dictionary (in Russian). Vol. 4. p. 334.
- catholic-hierarchy.org (2025). "Bishop Józef Arnulf Giedroyć". Catholic-Hierarchy. Archived from the original on 19 July 2025.
- Vyskupo Juozapo Arnulfo Giedraičio išduotas leidimas tuoktis (lotynų kalba), 1809 m.

Catholic Church titles
Preceded by Steponas Jonas Giedraitis	Bishop of Samogitia; 1802–1838	Succeeded by Simonas Mykolas Giedraitis
