= Michał Eustachy Brensztejn =

Polish historian, librarian and amateur archaeologist (1874–1938)

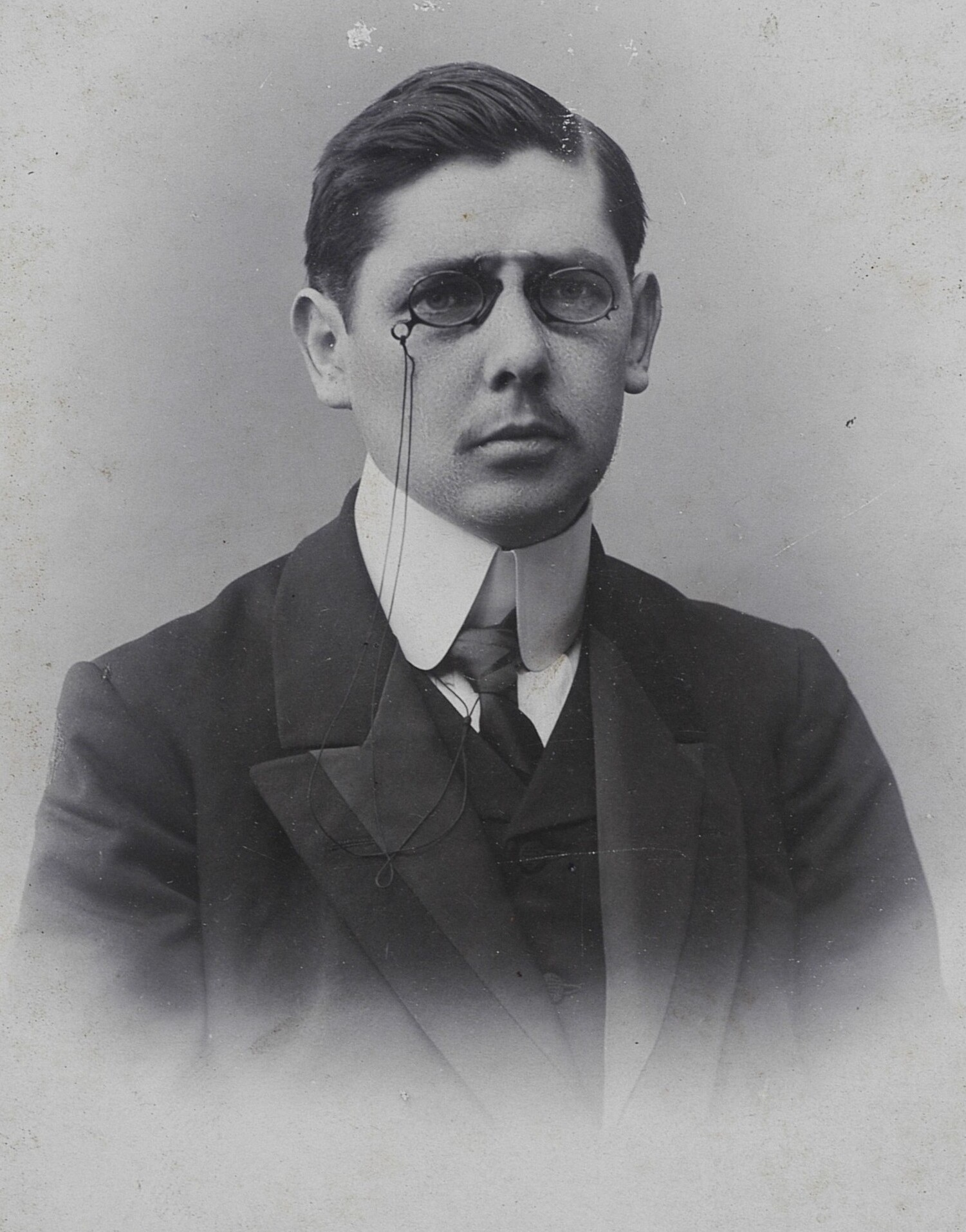
- Born: 2 October 1874; Telšiai, Kovno Governorate, Russian Empire
- Died: 29 March 1938 (aged 63); Vilnius, Second Polish Republic
- Education: Jagiellonian University
- Occupations: Historian, librarian, archaeologist
- Known for: Research on the cultural history of Samogitia and the former Grand Duchy of Lithuania

Michał Eustachy Brensztejn (2 October 1874 – 29 March 1938) was a Polish historian of culture, librarian and amateur archaeologist. His research focused primarily on the cultural history of the territories of the former Grand Duchy of Lithuania, archaeology and ethnography of Samogitia, and the history of books and libraries in Vilnius.

== Biography ==
Brensztejn was born in Telšiai in Samogitia on 2 October 1874 in the family of Konstanty and Melnia née Marczewska. He was educated at home and in Telšiai, Warsaw, and Vilnius, and later attended lectures at the Jagiellonian University. Because of his poor health, he often visited Zakopane, where he became acquainted with Piotr Chmielowski, Stanisław Witkiewicz, and Franciszek Piekosiński, who inspired him to pursue scholarly work in the field of history. He began publishing historical and archaeological studies in the 1890s. In Samogitia, he collected antiquities and conducted small-scale archaeological excavations.

In 1907, he completed his major archaeological work, the Inwentarz archeologiczny gubernji kowieńskiej (Archaeological Inventory of the Kovno Governorate), which recorded archaeological sites and finds across the governorate. The manuscript remained unpublished during his lifetime and was rediscovered in the archives of the State Museum of Archaeology in Warsaw in 2010 by Maria Krajewska.

Brensztejn moved permanently to Vilnius in 1910. There, he became involved in Polish cultural life, primarily in the Society of Friends of Science. During the Bolshevik occupation, he was arrested on 13 March 1919 and imprisoned in Lukiškės Prison. He escaped deportation only because the city was captured by Polish forces on 20 April 1919.

In 1919, he became a librarian at the recreated Vilnius University. From 1925 until his death, he headed its Manuscripts Department, where he organised the collections and catalogued about 2,000 manuscripts. From 1927, he was also curator of the museum collection of the Society of Friends of Science. He was a member of several other scholarly societies, including the Numismatic and Archaeological Society in Kraków, the Montwiłł Foundation, and the Numismatic Society in Poznań. He also collaborated with the Anthropological Commission of the Polish Academy of Arts and Sciences in Kraków and the Commission for the History of Education.

His scholarly interests included the history of libraries and printing, material culture, archaeology and the cultural history of Lithuania and Samogitia. He also contributed biographies to the Polish Biographical Dictionary. In 1936, Stefan Batory University awarded him an honorary doctorate in recognition of his scholarly work.

Brensztejn died in Vilnius on 29 March 1938.

== Selected works ==
- Krzyże i kapliczki żmudzkie: materyały do sztuki ludowej na Litwie (1906)
- Bibljoteka Uniwersytecka w Wilnie do roku 1832 (1922)
- Zarys dziejów ludwisarstwa na ziemiach b. Wielkiego Księstwa Litewskiego (1924)
- Dionizy Paszkiewicz, pisarz polsko-litewski na Żmudzi (1934)
- Inwentarz archeologiczny guberni kowieńskiej (completed 1907; published posthumously in 2016)

== Bibliography ==
- Banytė-Rowell, Rasa; Kurila, Laurynas; Simniškytė, Andra (2015). "Discoveries and Inspiration from Michał Brensztejn's 'Archaeological Inventory of the Kovno Gubernia'". Archaeologia Baltica. 21–22: 110–120. doi:10.15181/ab.v1i0.1139.
- Kościałkowski, Stanisław (1938). "Michał Eustachy Brensztejn (1874–1938): Zarys życia i działalności naukowo-publicystycznej wraz z wykazem bibliograficznym prac". Ateneum Wileńskie (in Polish). 13: I–XLV.
- Nowodworski, Witold (1938). "Ś. p. Michał Eustachy Brensztejn" (PDF). Przegląd Biblioteczny (in Polish). 12 (4): 303–308.
