= Lithuanian National Revival =

Period of the history of Lithuania

The Lithuanian National Revival, alternatively the Lithuanian National Awakening or Lithuanian nationalism (Lithuanian: Lietuvių tautinis atgimimas), was a period of the history of Lithuania in the 19th century, when a major part of Lithuanian-inhabited areas belonged to the Russian Empire (the Russian Partition of the Polish–Lithuanian Commonwealth). It was expressed by the rise of self-determination of the Lithuanians that led to the formation of the modern Lithuanian nation and culminated in the re-establishment of an independent Lithuanian state. The most active participants of the national revival included Vincas Kudirka and Jonas Basanavičius. The period largely corresponded to the rise of romantic nationalism and other national revivals of 19th-century Europe.

The revival was predated by a short period of the early 19th-century known as the "Samogitian Revival" led by students of Vilnius University, including Simonas Daukantas and Simonas Stanevičius. The most recent Lithuanian national revival may be linked to the late 20th century developments also known as the Singing Revolution.

== Lithuanian language status ==
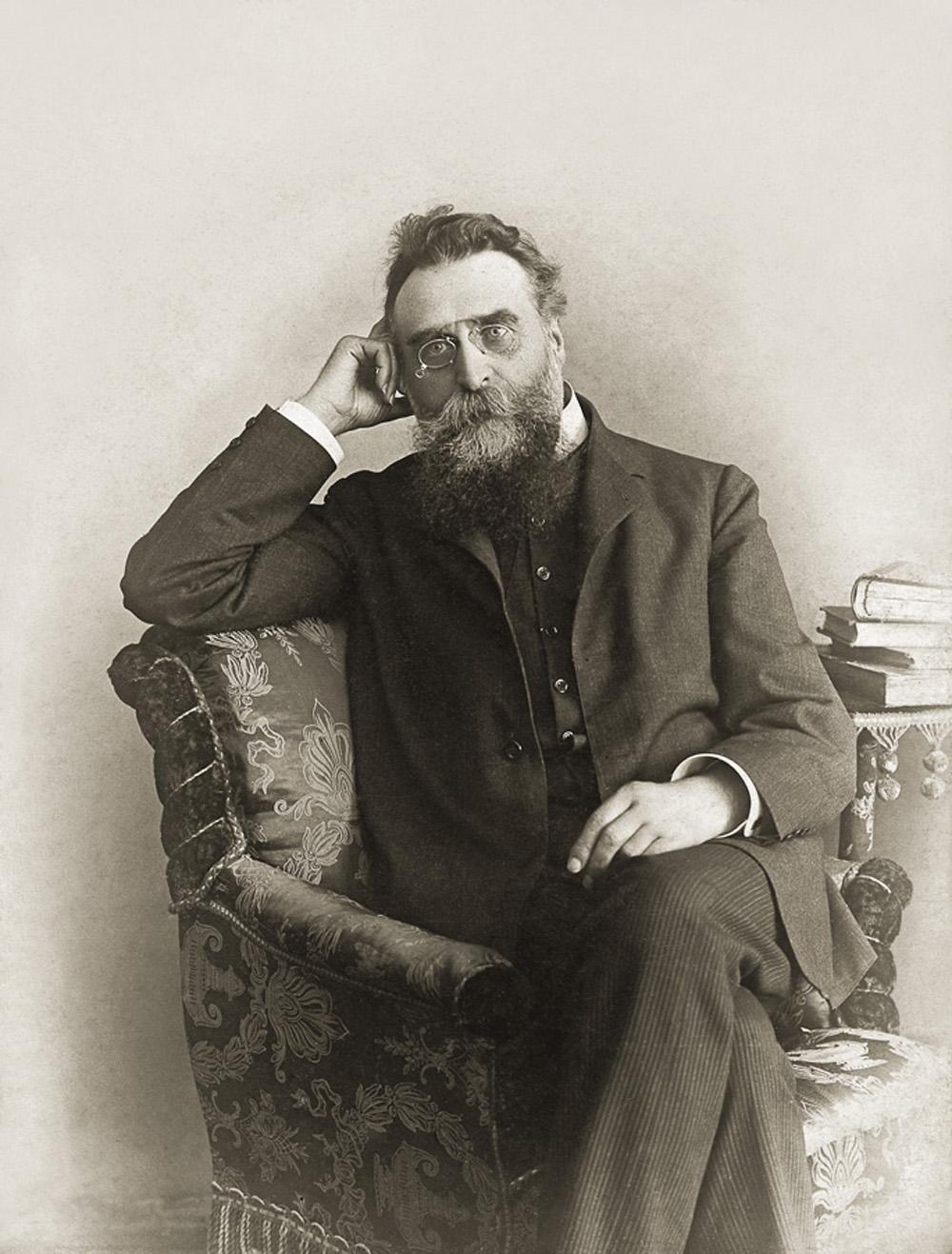
Jonas Basanavičius, one of the revival leaders

Due to a long period of common Polish–Lithuanian statehood and nationality, and the Russian Empire's policy of Russification, many of the Lithuanian nobles in the 19th century had become Polonized and the language was generally used only by the poor and by the middle classes; some of the latter tended to use Polish as a status symbol for social advancement. Lithuanian was generally a spoken language and was not considered prestigious enough for written usage; it was, however, retained by some members of the minor nobility, especially in the Samogitian region. The language was not yet standardized; its grammar varied greatly from region to region in form of Aukštaitijan and Samogitian dialects and their sub-dialects. There were even expectations that the Lithuanian language would become extinct, as the eastern territories within what is modern-day Lithuania and northwestern Belarus became increasingly Slavicized, and many people used Polish or Belarusian in their daily lives. At the beginning of the 19th century, the use of the Lithuanian language was largely limited to Lithuanian rural areas; the only area where Lithuanian was considered suitable for literature was German-controlled Lithuania Minor in East Prussia. Even here, an influx of German immigrants threatened the native language and Prussian Lithuanian culture.

Several factors contributed to its subsequent revival: the language drew attention from scholars of the emerging science of comparative linguistics; after the abolition of serfdom in the Russian Empire in 1861, social mobility increased, and Lithuanian intellectuals arose from the ranks of the rural populace; and language became associated with identity in Lithuania, as elsewhere across Europe. Within the Catholic Church, the barriers that had earlier prevented commoners from entering the priesthood were eased. A closer relationship developed between the educated clergy, who were increasingly of ethnic Lithuanian stock, and their parishioners, including empathy for their wish to use the Lithuanian language. The emerging national movement sought to distance itself from both Polish and Russian influences, and the use of the Lithuanian language was seen as an important aspect of this movement. Polish and Polonized Lithuanian noble critics of the Lithuanian National Revival and its activists and adherents pejoratively called it Lithuanian separatism and Lithuanomania.

== Development of national ideas ==
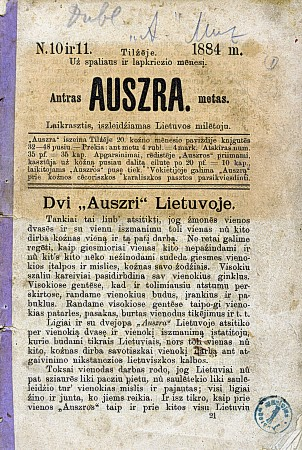
Auszra formulated the ideas of nationalism

The development of Lithuanian national culture and national identity was further burdened by the Lithuanian press ban, one of the repressive measures that followed the 1863 uprising. After the uprising, serfdom was finally abandoned. The revival began among young educated people of Lithuanian extraction who attended higher education studies at the universities of the Russian Empire and foreign states. Many were sons of wealthy farmers in origin and thus, having come from the peasant class was least affected by Polonisation. The movement resulted in the publication of the Lithuanian newspapers Aušra and Varpas, followed by the publication of poems and books in Lithuanian. These writings romanticized the past of the Grand Duchy of Lithuania, depicting the nation as formerly a great power with many heroes.

The revival spearheaded the independence movement, with various organizations opposing Russification and Russian influence. Russian policy became harsher in response, and there were known instances of attacks on Catholic churches; meanwhile, a ban on the Lithuanian press continued. Yet even with a press ban, the literacy of Lithuanians continued to rise significantly and was one of the greatest among the nations in the Russian Empire, behind only Finns, Estonians and Latvians. The political Lithuanian nation had already been formed by the end of the 19th century. Political claims were voiced in the Great Seimas of Vilnius, and political and cultural activity continued to grow after the press ban was finally lifted in 1904.

== History of scholarship ==
The first important study on the Lithuanian national revival was written by Michał Pius Römer in 1908 - Lietuva. Studija apie lietuvių tautos atgimimą (Litwa. Studyum o odrodzeniu narodu litewskiego, Lithuania: Study of national revival).

== See also ==
- Barn theatres in Lithuania
