= Šilas (disambiguation) =

Šilas is a neighbourhood of Vilnius, Lithuania.

Šilas may also refer to:

- FK Šilas, a Lithuanian football club

== See also ==
- The Forest of Anykščiai, a Lithuanian poem
