= Šaulys =

Šaulys is the masculine form of a Lithuanian family name. Its meaning is "shooter," "rifleman". Its feminine forms are: Šaulienė (married woman or widow) and Šaulytė (unmarried woman). Notable people with the surname include:

- Irena Šiaulienė (born 1955), Lithuanian politician
- Jurgis Šaulys, Lithuanian economist, diplomat, and politician
- Kazimieras Steponas Šaulys, Lithuanian Roman Catholic priest, theologian
- Gabriele Šaulytė (born 1990), Lithuanian chess player
- Evelina Šaulytė (born 1991), Lithuanian chess player
