= Antanas Baranauskas =

Lithuanian poet, mathematician and bishop (1835–1902)

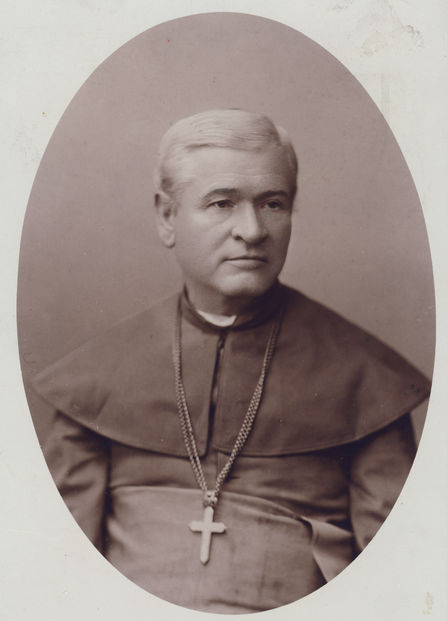
- Baranauskas in 1899
- Born: 17 January 1835; Anykščiai, Vilnius Governorate, Russian Empire (now Lithuania)
- Died: 26 November 1902 (aged 67); Sejny, Congress Poland, Russian Empire
- Resting place: Basilica of the Visitation of the Blessed Virgin Mary, Sejny
- Occupations: Poet, linguist, bishop
- Writing career
- Language: Lithuanian, Polish, Russian
- Genre: Romanticism
- Notable work: The Forest of Anykščiai

Antanas Baranauskas (Polish: Antoni Baranowski; 17 January 1835 – 26 November 1902) was a Lithuanian poet, mathematician and Catholic bishop of Sejny. Baranauskas is best known as the author of the Lithuanian poem Anykščių šilelis. He used various pen names, including A.B., Bangputys, Jurksztas Smalaūsis, Jurkštas Smalaūsis, and Baronas. He also wrote poetry in Polish.

== Early years ==
Baranauskas was born to a small farmer family of Lithuanian nobility origin. Early in his youth, his parents sent him to a local parochial school. After finishing his studies there, Baranauskas initially remained in the parish. As described in his diary, between the years 1841 and 1843 he learned the Polish language and between 1848 and 1851 Russian. His first attempts to write poetry and rhyme in Lithuanian are to be found in his diaries. Later he attended a bi-yearly school for communal writers in Rumšiškės. There he started writing his first poems in Polish.

== Adulthood ==
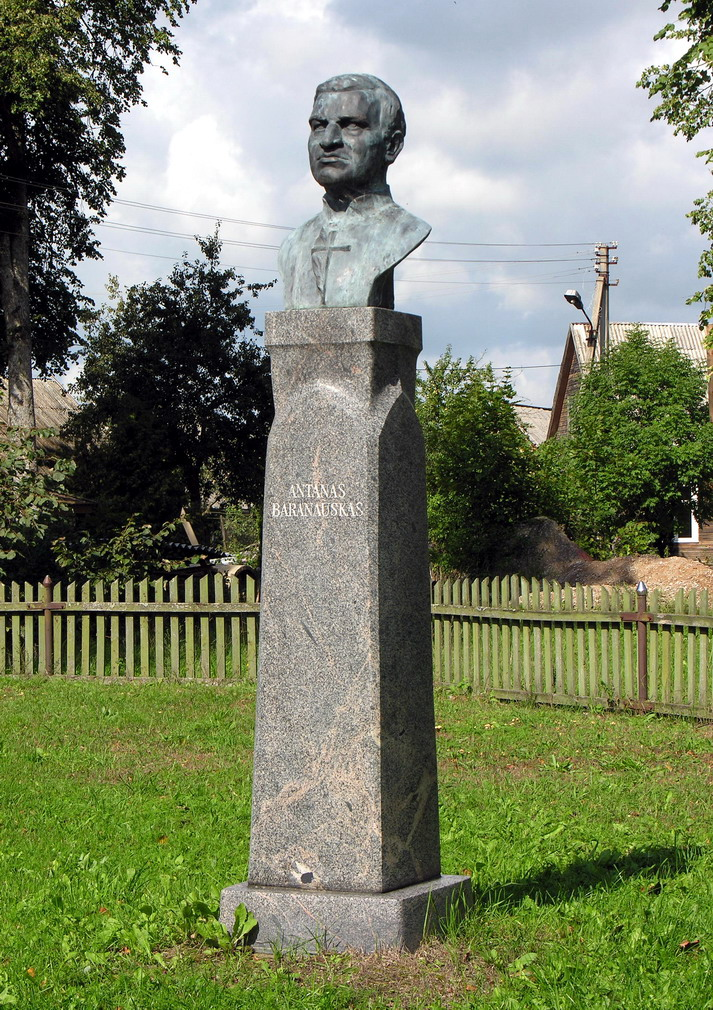
Antanas Baranauskas bust in Seda

In 1853, he finished school and started working as a writer and chancellor in various towns. During this period he began a relationship with the Samogitian poet Karolina Proniewska (Karolina Praniauskaitė) and her family. The two shared a passion for the poetry of Adam Mickiewicz. Praniauskaitė suggested that Baranauskas should try to write more in Lithuanian. In 1856, Karolina's family tried to separate the couple by sponsoring Baranauskas' entry into the Catholic Seminary of Varniai. While studying there, he began to concentrate on the development of the written Lithuanian language, and wrote a commentary on Lithuanian and Samogitian dialects Apie lietuvių ir žemaičių kalbą. It was the first scholarly attempt to distinguish these different Lithuanian dialects.

While in the seminary, Baranauskas started writing poems in Lithuanian, and from that time essentially wrote in that language. One of his earlier works written under the influence of Mickiewicz was Anykščių šilelis (The Forest/Pinewood of Anykščiai). It is considered a classic work of Lithuanian literature. Literature critics consider it as a symbolic reference to Lithuanian history and language. While some critics contend that Baranauskas wrote the poem in anger, in response to an assertion by his lector Alexander Gabszewicz that the Lithuanian language was not beautiful enough to write poems in, others dispute this as a misinterpretation. The poem was first published in 1861, and again in 1862 in Laurynas Ivinskis' Farmers' Calendar.

From 1858 to 1862, Barnauskas studied at the Saint Petersburg Roman Catholic Theological Academy, receiving a master's degree in theology. Between 1863 and 1864, he studied at Munich's, Rome's, Innsbruck's and Louvain's Catholic universities.

Starting in 1871, he worked at the Kaunas Priest Seminary, and began teaching the Lithuanian language. He authored a grammar textbook in Lithuanian, Mokslas lietuviškosios kalbos. After Baranauskas went to Sejny, he gained a considerable reputation by being able to preach in both Polish and Lithuanian. By 1880, after he realized that the ban of printing in the Lithuanian language would not be lifted, in spite of several unofficial promises by Tsarist authorities to do so, his desire to promote the Lithuanian language slowly declined. He never ceased to believe, that Lithuanian should be developed and expanded and until his death worked on a translation of the Bible into Lithuanian, and working 10–12 hours a day, succeeded to translate three fifths of the Old Testament.

In his later years, Antanas Baranauskas, enjoyed some of the comforts of life. His beliefs were similar to the later Krajowcy group. Therefore, for the rest of his life he tried to reconcile nationalists from both - Lithuanian and Polish - sides. For that he was rather unpopular amongst the nationalists in both sides.

Most of the Lithuanians did not attend his burial, considering him a traitor of the national revival movement, mostly Russian officials and Poles attended it. It was a completely different story when a monument for him was built in Sejny. Only Lithuanians attended the event, and even then paint was spilt on the monument the following night.

== Legacy ==
Before Baranauskas, the main "respectable" language in the area was considered to be Polish, so Baranauskas was one of the few primary individuals responsible for re-legitimizing the Lithuanian language, and by extension, Lithuanian culture. Referring to Baranauskas in a lecture, the early 20th century Lithuanian poet Maironis once said, "Without him, there might not be us".

Baranauskas's home is preserved in the Anykščiai Regional Park.
