= Irena Šiaulienė =

Lithuanian politician

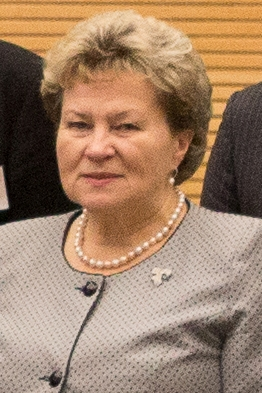

Deputy Speaker of the Seimas
- In office 7 April 2017 – 12 November 2020

Member of the Seimas
- In office 25 November 1992 – 12 November 2020

Personal details
- Born: 19 February 1955 (age 71) Kolainiai, Lithuanian SSR, Soviet Union
- Party: Democratic Labour Party of Lithuania (1990-2001); Social Democratic Party of Lithuania (2001-2017); Independent (2017-2018); Social Democratic Labour Party of Lithuania (2018-2021); Union of Democrats "For Lithuania" (since 2022)
- Education: Vilnius University

Irena Šiaulienė (born 1955) is a Lithuanian politician who is the deputy speaker of Seimas, the unicameral parliament of Lithuania.

== Early life ==
Irena Šiaulienė was born on 19 February 1955 in Kolainiai, Kelmė District Municipality. She attended a school in Telšiai District Municipality before enrolling herself at the History department of Vilnius State University, from where she received her degree (1971–76). She did her PhD in 1987.

== Career ==
From 1976 to 1992, Šiaulienė was an associate professor of history at the Klaipėda University. In 1990, she became a deputy-chair of the Democratic Labour Party of Lithuania. She won the 1992 Lithuanian parliamentary election to enter the Sixth Seimas and has since retained her membership and has served on various parliamentary committees. From 2000, she has been the chair of the Democratic Labour Party group in parliament and was chosen the deputy speaker of the Seimas on 4 July 2017. She is also a member of the commission for the National Historical Memory and that for Addiction Prevention.

In 2004, Šiaulienė was awarded the Cross of Commander of the Order for Merits to Lithuania.
