= Rietavas Manor =

Residential manor in Rietavas, Lithuania

Coordinates: 55°43′42″N 21°55′53″E

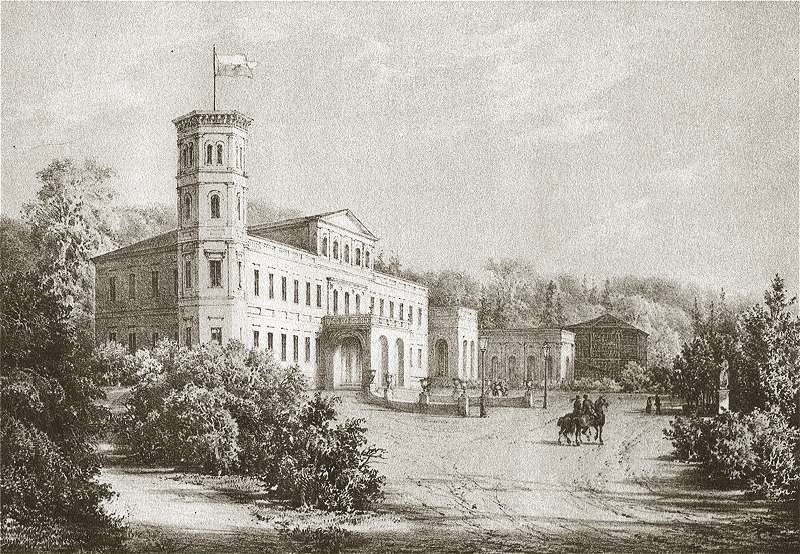
- Interactive map of the Rietavas Manor area

General information
- Construction started: Second half of the 19th century

Rietavas Manor is a former Ogiński residential manor in Rietavas, Lithuania. Aside from its foundations, the primary manor building has not survived; however, many parts of the ensemble have – including the former musicians' dormitory, water tower, park, a few outbuildings, guard house, part of the wall, two gates, and the Ogiński Family Chapel, where Bogdan Ogiński and his brother duke Mykolas Ogiński are buried.

== History ==
Rietavas was in the Duchy of Samogitia and together with surrounding lands was owned by the Grand Dukes of Lithuania. It was one of the most important centres for defence in Samogitia and along an important trade route.

From the end of the 16th century to the beginning of the 18th century, the lands were rented by the Sapieha family.

Then Marshal of the Sejm Tadeusz Franciszek Ogiński (1712–1783) (married to Izabella née Radziwiłł) took over the lease.

In 1775, Rietavas was given to Franciszek Ksawery Ogiński.

=== Michał Kleofas Ogiński (1765–1833) ===
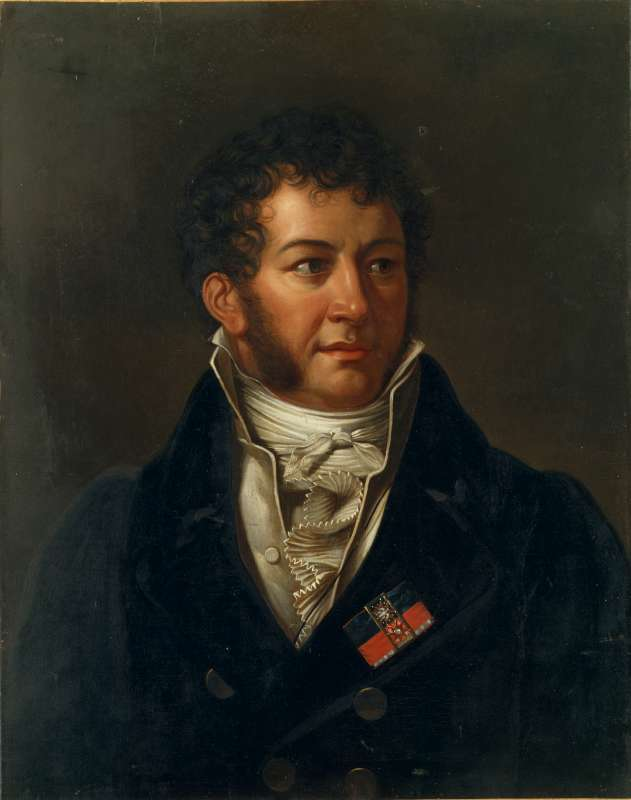
Michał Kleofas Ogiński

In 1812, Rietavas was acquired by Michał Kleofas Ogiński (1765–1833), Tadeusz Franciszek Ogiński's grandson.

Michał Ogiński was a Polish diplomat, Grand Treasurer, senator and composer. During the Kościuszko Uprising in 1794, Ogiński commanded his own unit and during the November Uprising in 1831, the production of weapons and ammunition for insurgents was carried out at Rietavas. Michał Ogiński didn't spend time at Rietavas, however, preferring life abroad (including Paris, Constantinople, Vilnius and Florence).

In 1787, Michał Ogiński married Izabela Lasocka (1789–1802). They had two children, Thaddeus (1800) and Francis Ksawery (Xavier) (1801), but the marriage broke down and ended in divorce.

Michał then married Maria Ogińska (née Neri) (1778–1851) but this marriage fared no better. The Ogińskis had three daughters, Amelia, Emma and Ida, and one son, Ireneusz Kleofas Ogiński (1808–1863). All children, it was said, had different fathers. Diarist and writer Stanislaw Morawski, in his autobiography “My Years of Youth in Vilnius” wrote:

Apart from Zaluska [Amelia, born on 10 December 1803, who later became Countess Zaluska] conceived with Ogiński, every one of his daughters [Emma and Ida, born in 1805 and 1813 respectively] had a different father. Her son [Ireneusz, born in 1807] was conceived of the singer Paliani.

Italian Giuseppe Paliani was the music tutor for the Ogiński girls.

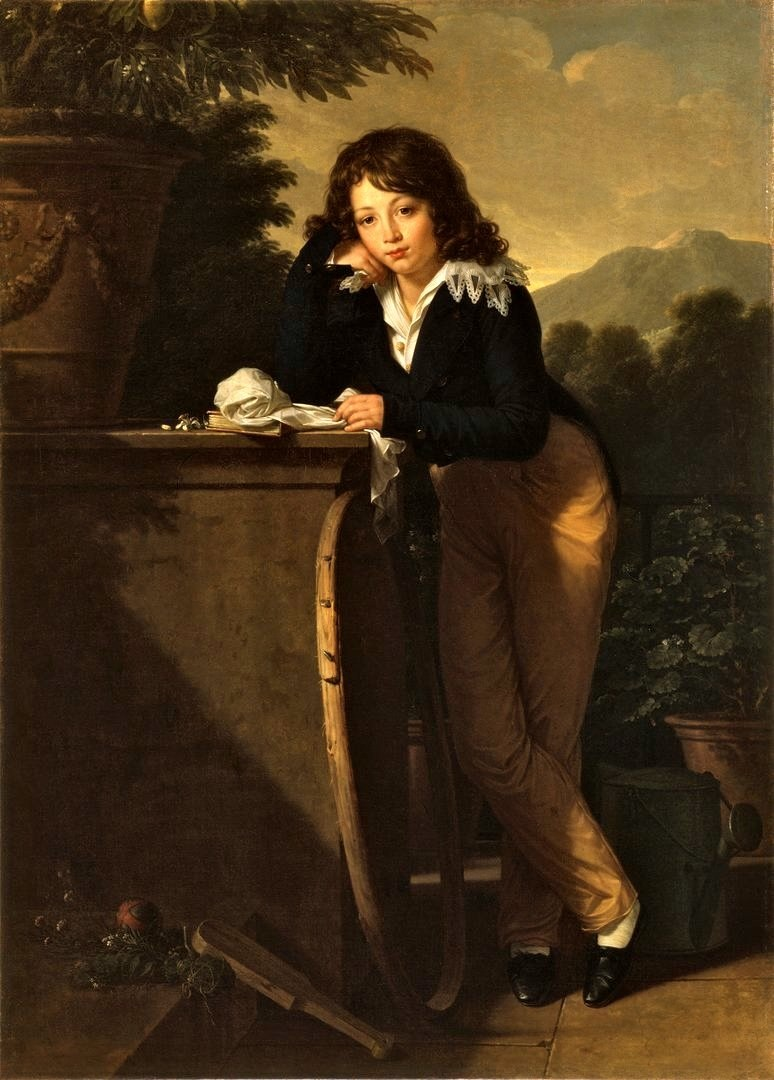
Ireneusz Kleofas Ogiński by François-Xavier Fabre (1766–1837)

Ireneusz was a very good-looking boy, which he used to his advantage around the Ogiński estates and in the courtly circles of St Petersburg.

Ireneusz was groomed to inherit not only Rietavas, but also several other Ogiński estates throughout Lithuania.

=== Ireneusz Kleofas Ogiński (1808–1863) ===
After Michał died, Prince Ireneusz Ogiński inherited Rietavas, settled there and built a new residence in the second half of the 19th century.

In 1859, he founded an agricultural school. He also began a smelter and an agricultural machinery factory. Agricultural exhibitions were also organized.

Ireneusz Ogiński died in 1863 and left his vast fortunes to his sons Princes Bogdan Michał Ogiński (1848–1909) and Michał Mikołaj Ogiński (1849–1902), owner of Plungė Manor.

Bogdan Ogiński inherited Rietavas.

=== Bogdan Michał Ogiński (1848–1909) ===
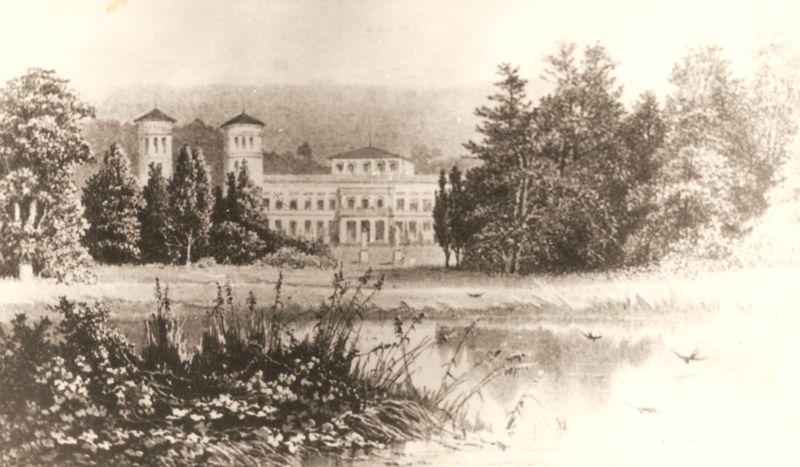
Rietavas Manor in 1883

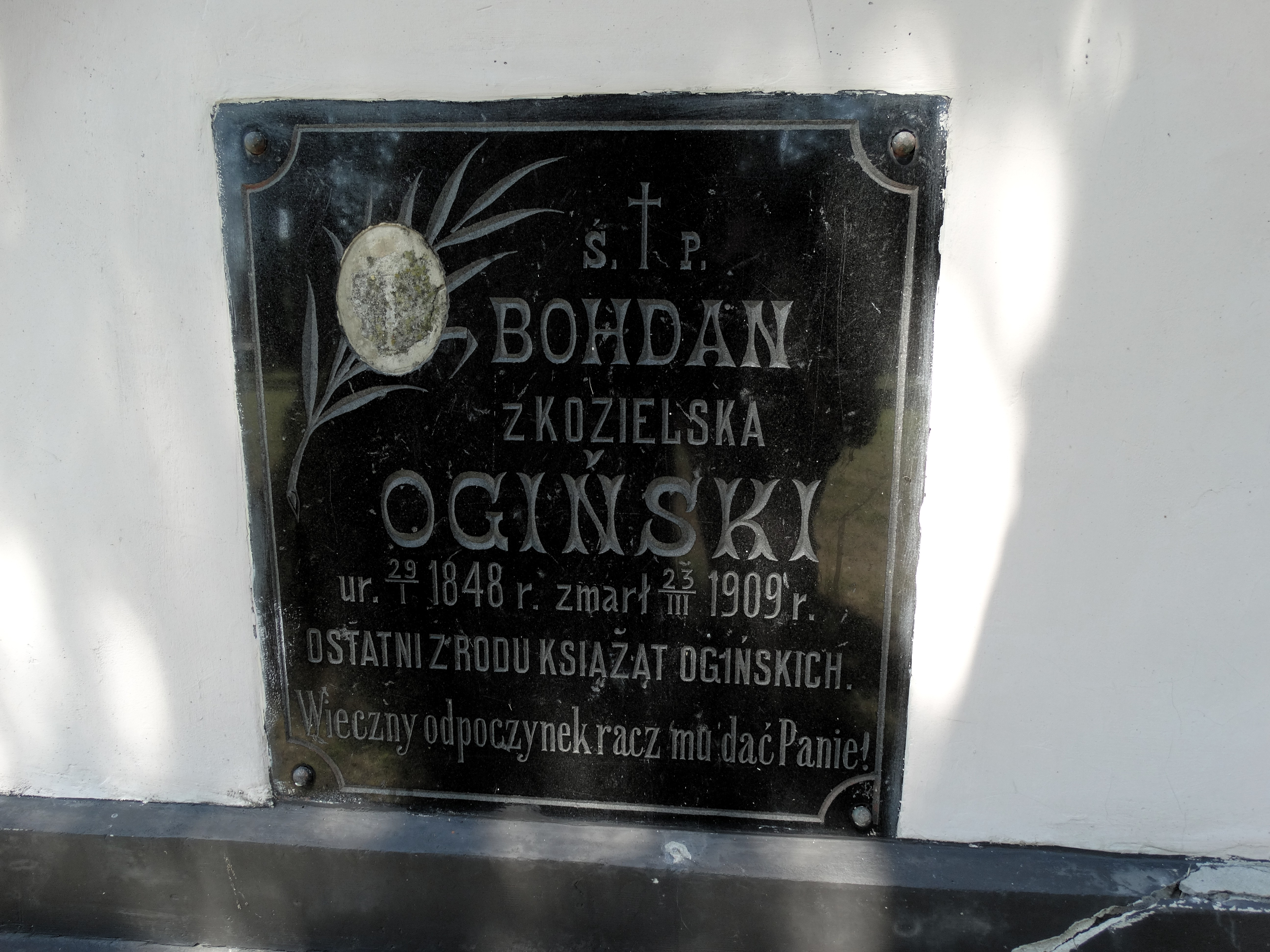
Ogiński family chapel, memorial plaque, Rietavas, Lithuania

Perhaps in keeping with family tradition, Bogdan, however, may not have actually been Ireneusz Ogiński's biological son.

Sometime around the late 1820s, Ireneusz had married Countess Jozefina Kalinowska, whose sister Countess Olga was the mistress of Tsarevitch Alexander, the son of Tsar Nicholas I.

When Jozefina died in 1844, Ireneusz became a still young, very eligible and fabulously wealthy widower, which was noted in the St Petersburg court four years later when it was discovered that Olga (Bogdan's wife's sister) was pregnant. The father may have been either the Tsarevitch or his father. That wasn't of primary interest, however. The crucial consideration was to provide legitimacy for the new Romanov.

Whether Ireneusz Ogiński was forced into marrying Olga or whether he did so willingly is not on record. However, in 1848 Olga gave birth to Prince Bogdan. Bogdan bore the Ogiński name even though he may have really been a Romanov. The important fact was that the Ogiński name, a very good one and totally acceptable for an imperial child, had become available at a time when it was most needed.

Duke Bogdan Ogiński grew up to be an innovator and patron of the arts:

- In 1872, he founded a music school in Rietavas, and in 1883 a symphony orchestra.
- In 1882, the first telephone line in Lithuania (between Rietavas-Plungė-Kretinga) was established.
- On 17 April 1892, during Easter, the first light bulbs in Lithuania were lit in Rietavas Manor and the first power plant started operating.
- Bogdan established 7 mills, 6 sawmills, a furniture factory and an iron foundry.
- He also reconstructed Rietavas Manor and conservatory.

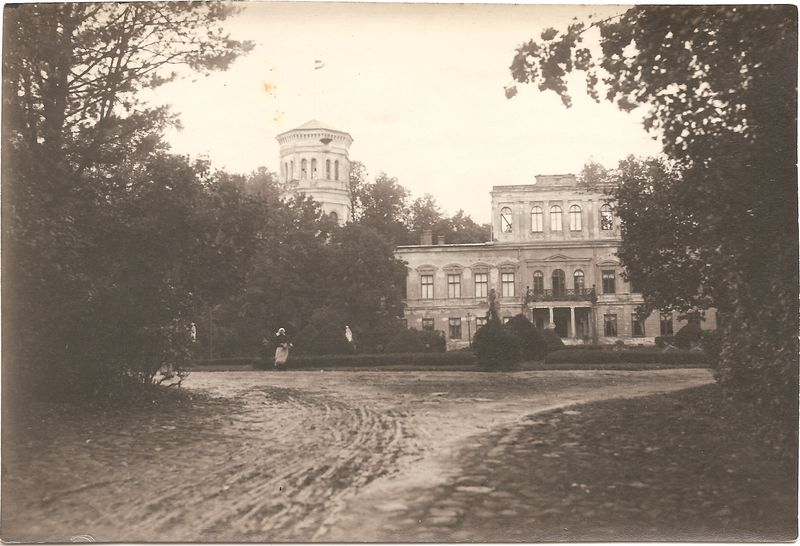
Rietavas Manor c1915

Bogdan continued the tradition begun by his father, Ireneusz Ogiński, by organizing agricultural exhibitions at Rietavas.

He also sponsored the building and equipping of churches. In 1874, the construction of Church of St. Michael the Archangel in Rietavas was completed. Between 1897 and 1899, Bogdan built a wooden church in Kemeri, Latvia, where he spent his summers. Bogdan was also responsible for the repair and installation of the church in Bobrek, Poland.

He was also a member of the Animal Care Society, who worked hard to save the Lithuanian breed of Žemaitukai horse from extinction.

Bogdan Ogiński died childless in 1909, after a serious illness, at age 61. He was buried in the Ogiński Family chapel in Rietavas.

In the same year, a fire broke out in Rietavas and many valuables were destroyed.

The devastation of the manor continued during World War I, when many valuable items, musical instruments and works of art were removed from the palace to Germany. The copper roof of the palace was also torn off, and the swans and pheasants living in the park were shot.

=== The Interwar Period ===
After 1922, the authorities of the Republic of Lithuania nationalized the estate. The land was parcelled out and the palace was transferred to the Lithuanian Catholic Women's Society.

In 1926 it was sold at auction to Povilas Jurgaitis who demolished the palace and built brick houses.

=== The Soviet Period ===
In Soviet times there was a collective farm centre and an agricultural school.

=== The Present Period ===
Only the foundations of the primary manor building have survived, but many parts of the ensemble still exist, including the former musicians' dormitory, water tower, park, a few outbuildings, guard house, part of the wall, two gates, and the Ogiński Family Chapel, where Bogdan Ogiński and his brother duke Mykolas Ogiński are buried.

== Gallery ==
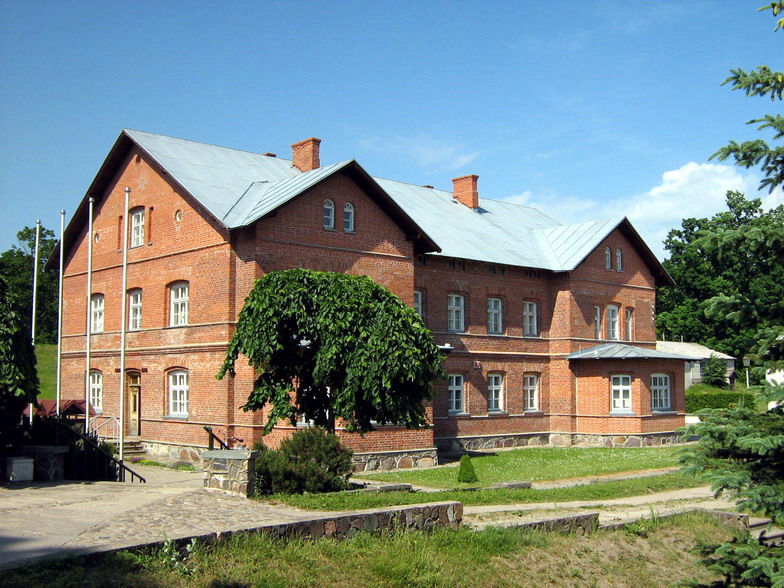
Rietavas Ogiński Museum of Culture History

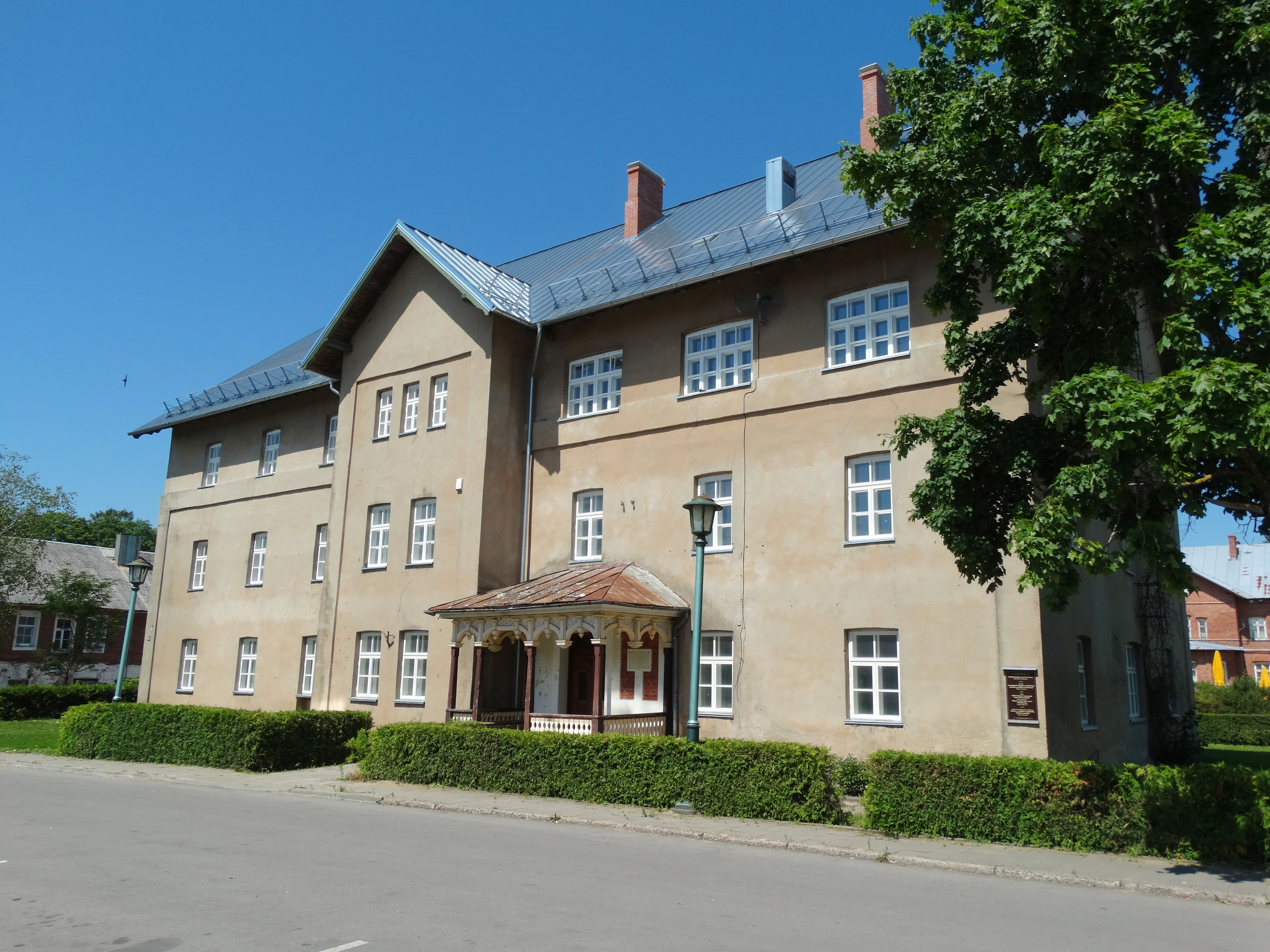
Former musicians dormitory

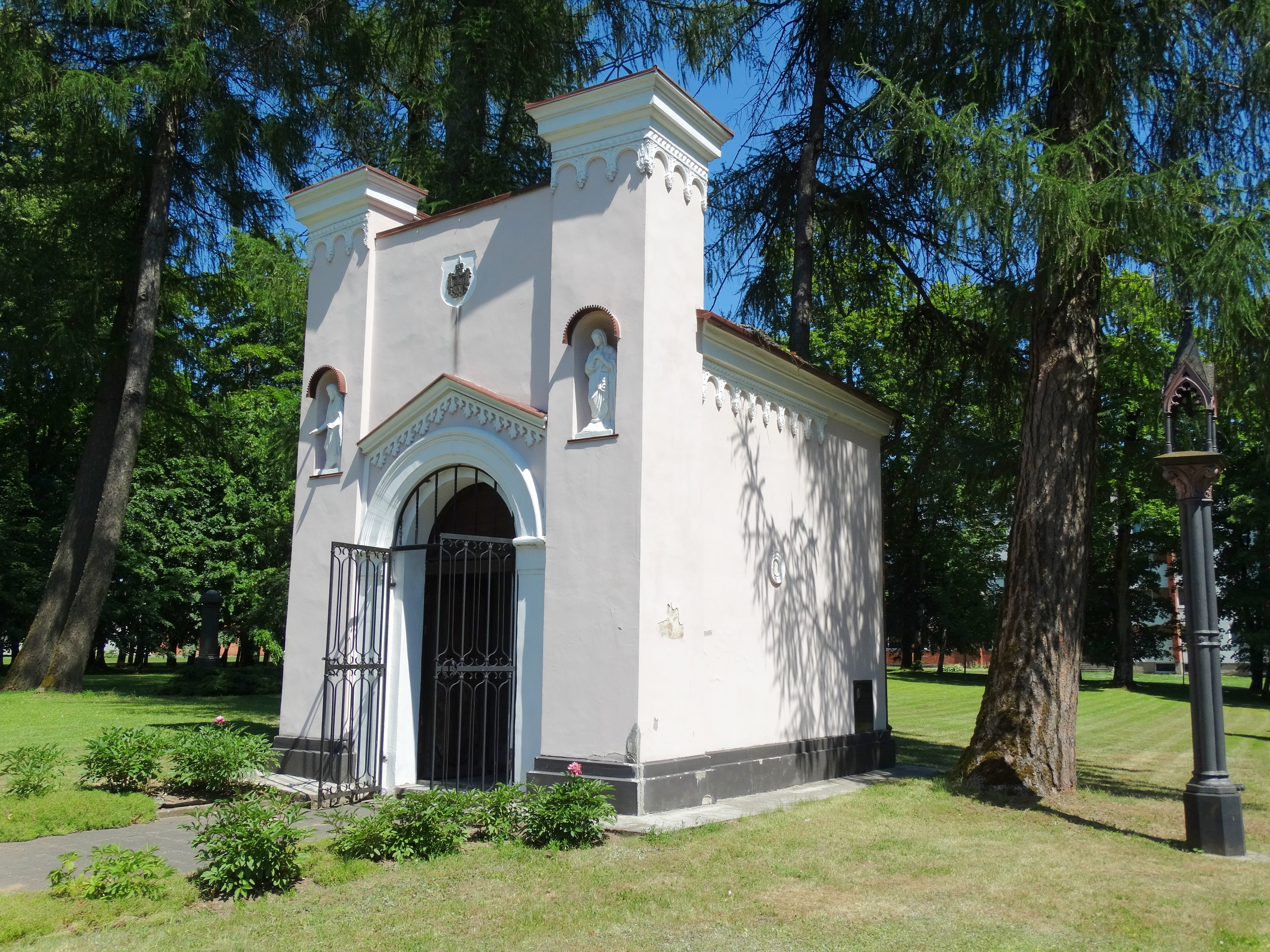
Ogiński Family Chapel

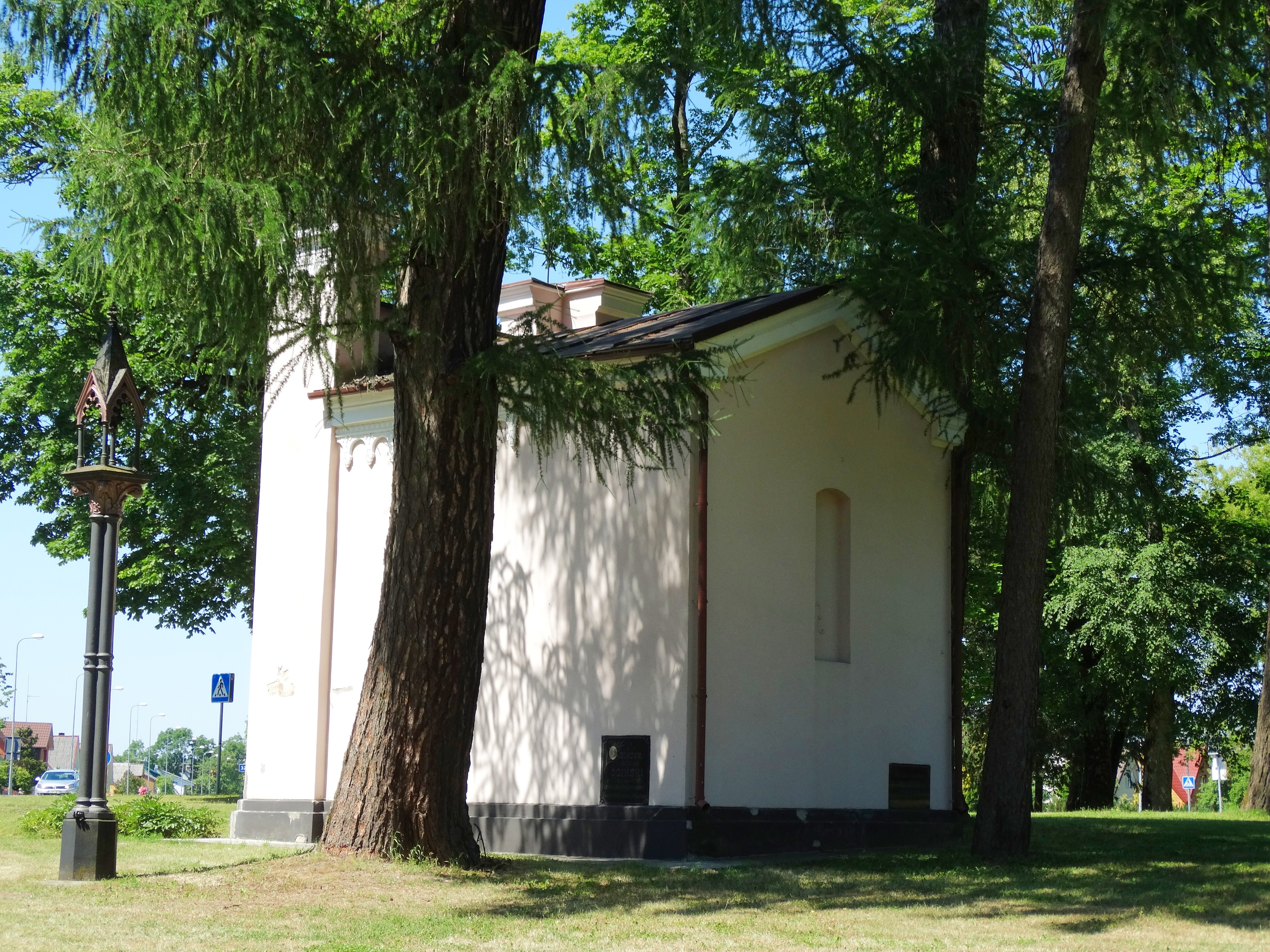
Ogiński Family Chapel

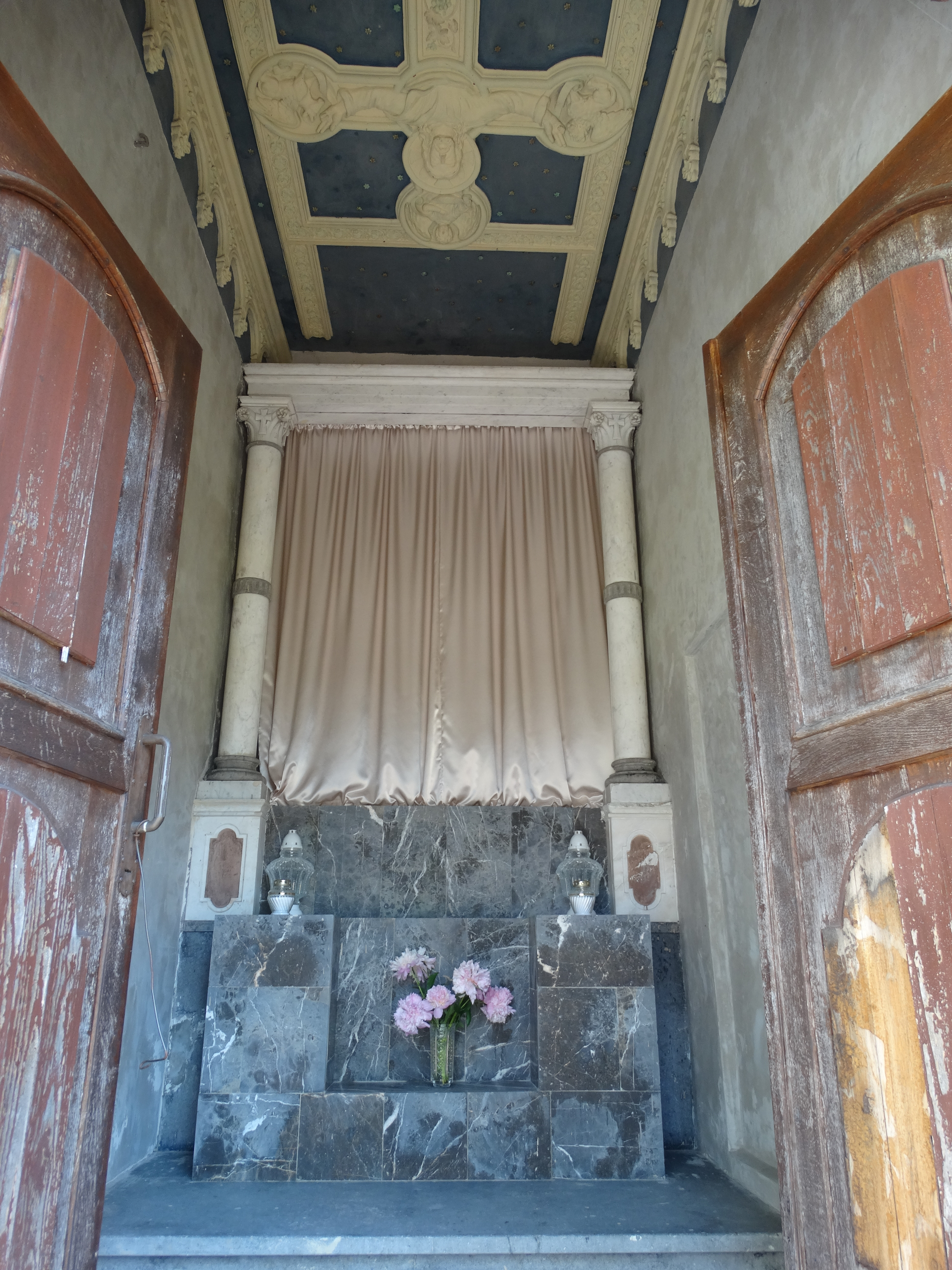
Inside of the Ogiński Family Chapel

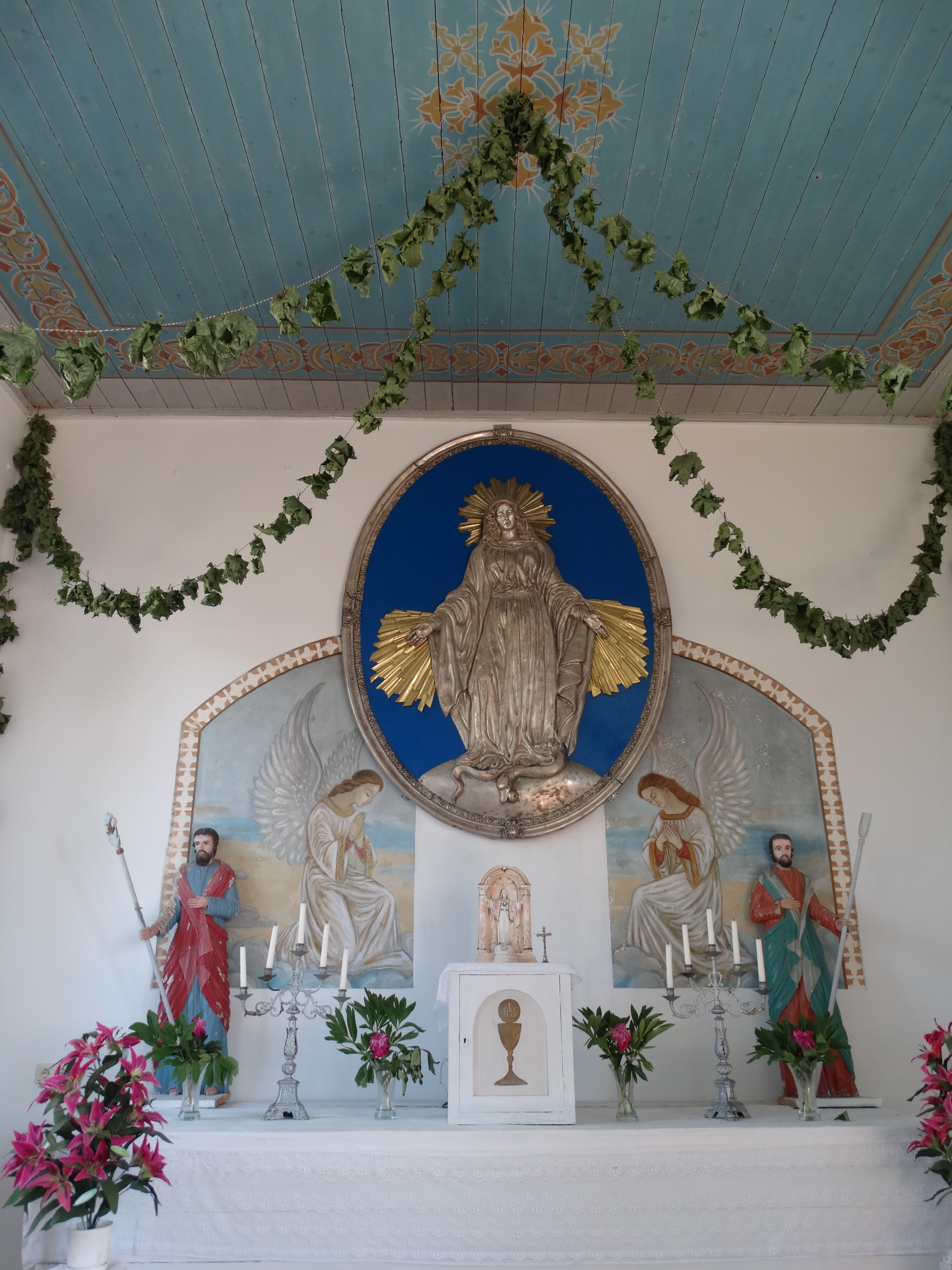
Saint Mary painting inside of the Spraudis Church

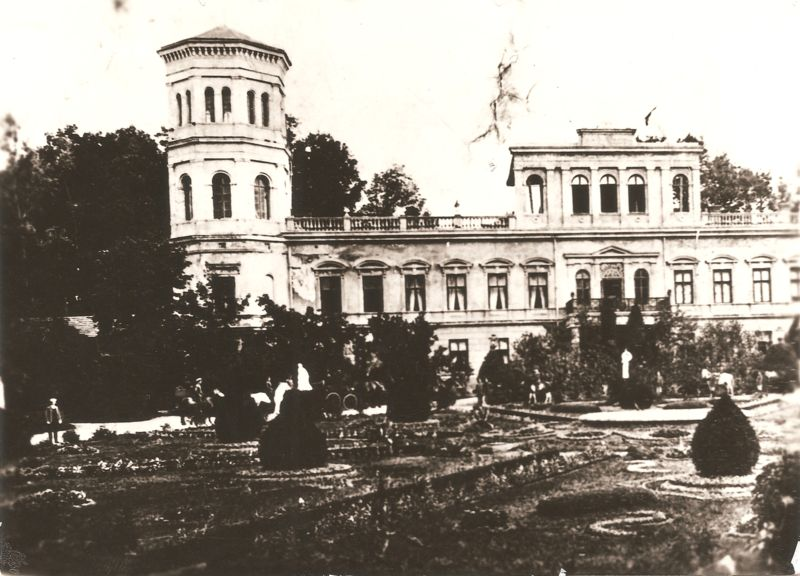
Rietavas Manor, c. 1910s

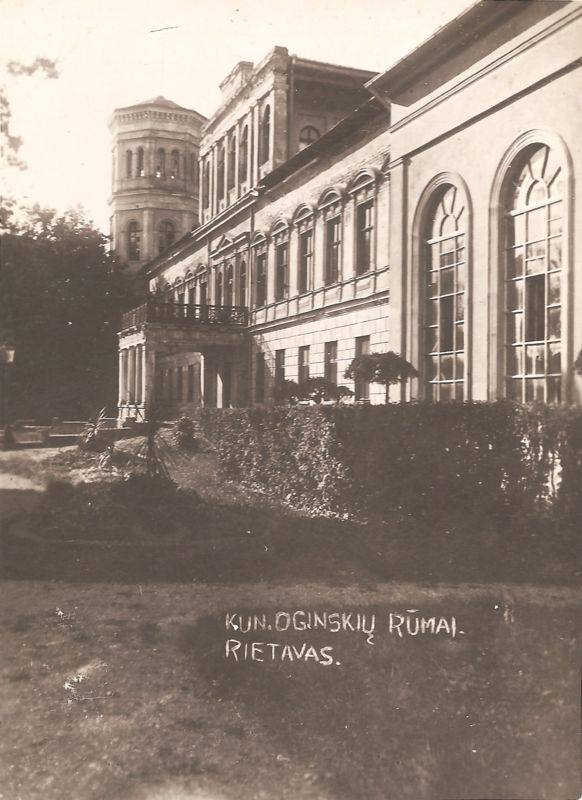
Rietavas Manor in 1920-1922

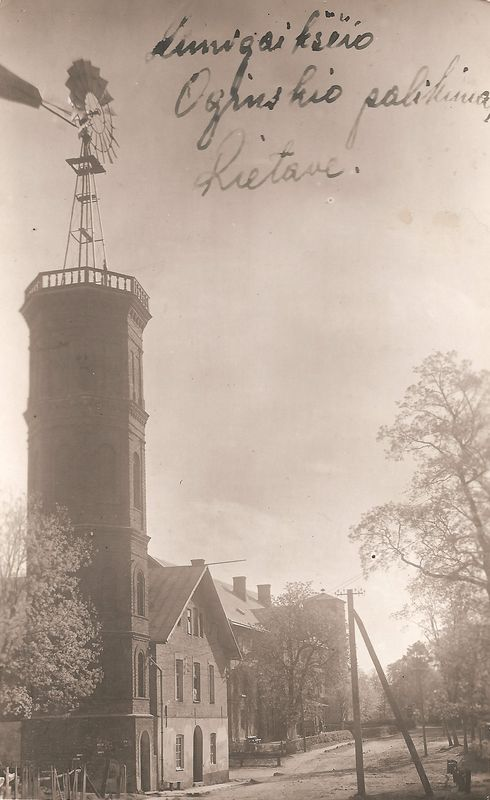
Rietavas Manor water tower in 1936
