= Zabieliškis =

- Village
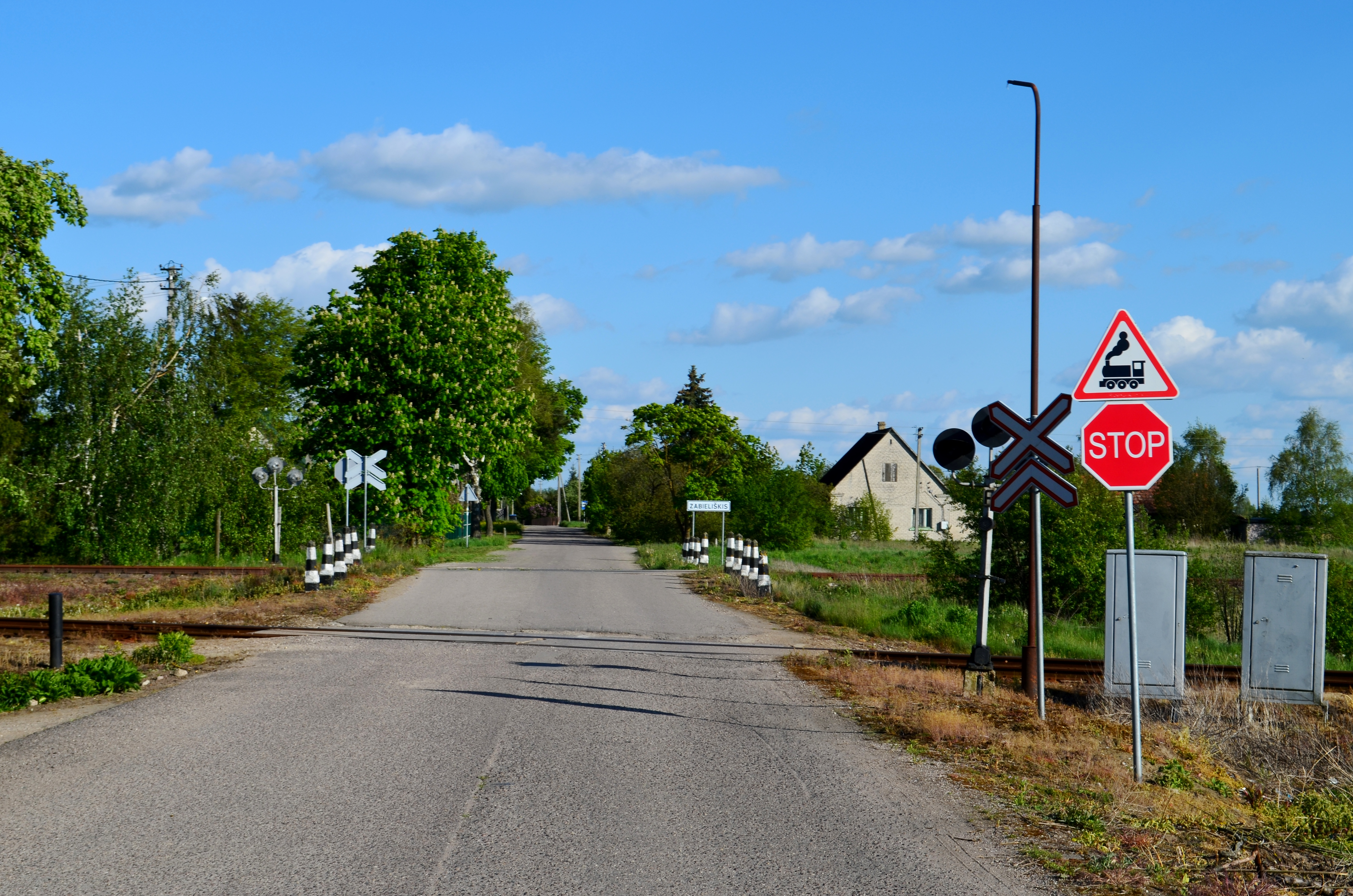

- Location in Lithuania Zabieliškis (Lithuania)
- Coordinates: 55°15′29″N 24°00′11″E
- Country: Lithuania
- County: Kaunas County
- Municipality: Kėdainiai district municipality
- Eldership: Pelėdnagiai Eldership

Population (2011)
  - Total: 20
- Time zone: UTC+2 (EET)
  - Summer (DST): UTC+3 (EEST)

Zabieliškis (formerly Russian: Забѣлишки, Polish: Zabielszczyzna) is a village in Kėdainiai district municipality, in Kaunas County, in central Lithuania. According to the 2011 census, the village had a population of 20 people. It is located 3 kilometres (1.9 mi) from Kėdainiai city center, next to the Kėdainiai Industrial Zone, by the Nesekė rivulet and some ponds. There are relics of the former Zabieliškis manor. A dump site of "Lifosa" fertilizer factory phosphogypsum waste and a former site of Kėdainiai landfill is located in Zabieliškis.

== History ==
At the end of the 19th century Zabieliškis was an estate, a property of the Stomma family. In the 1970s a part of Zabieliškis village was merged with Kėdainiai.

== Demography ==
Historical population

Year	Pop.	±% p.a.
1902	206	—
1923	189	−0.41%
1959	179	−0.15%
1970	622	+11.99%

Year	Pop.	±% p.a.
1979	45	−25.31%
1989	32	−3.35%
2001	35	+0.75%
2011	20	−5.44%

Source: 1902, 1923, 1959 & 1970, 1979, 1989, 2001, 2011

== Notable people ==
- Antanas Valionis (born in 1950), Lithuanian politician

== Images ==
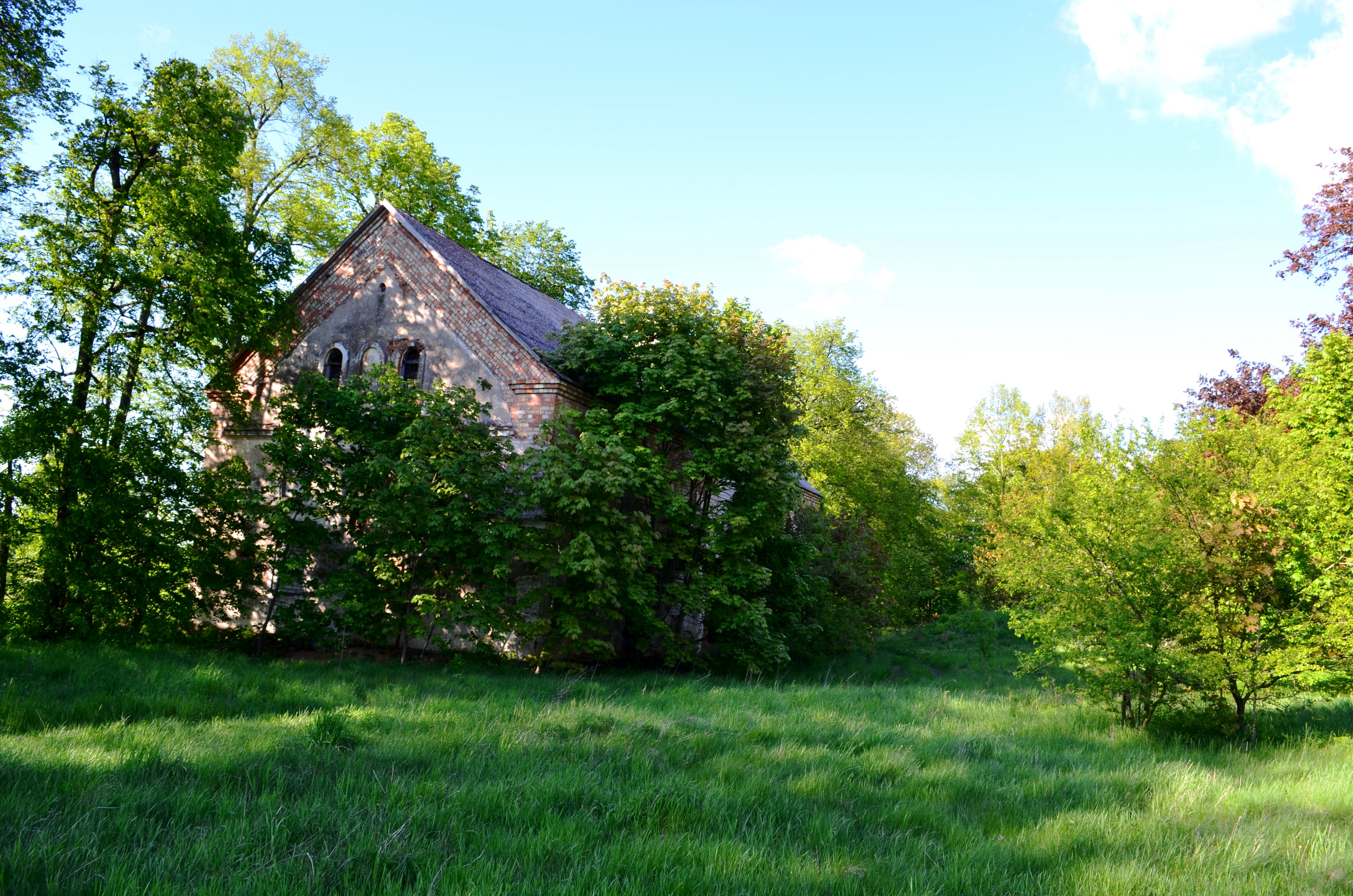
Zabieliškis manor site

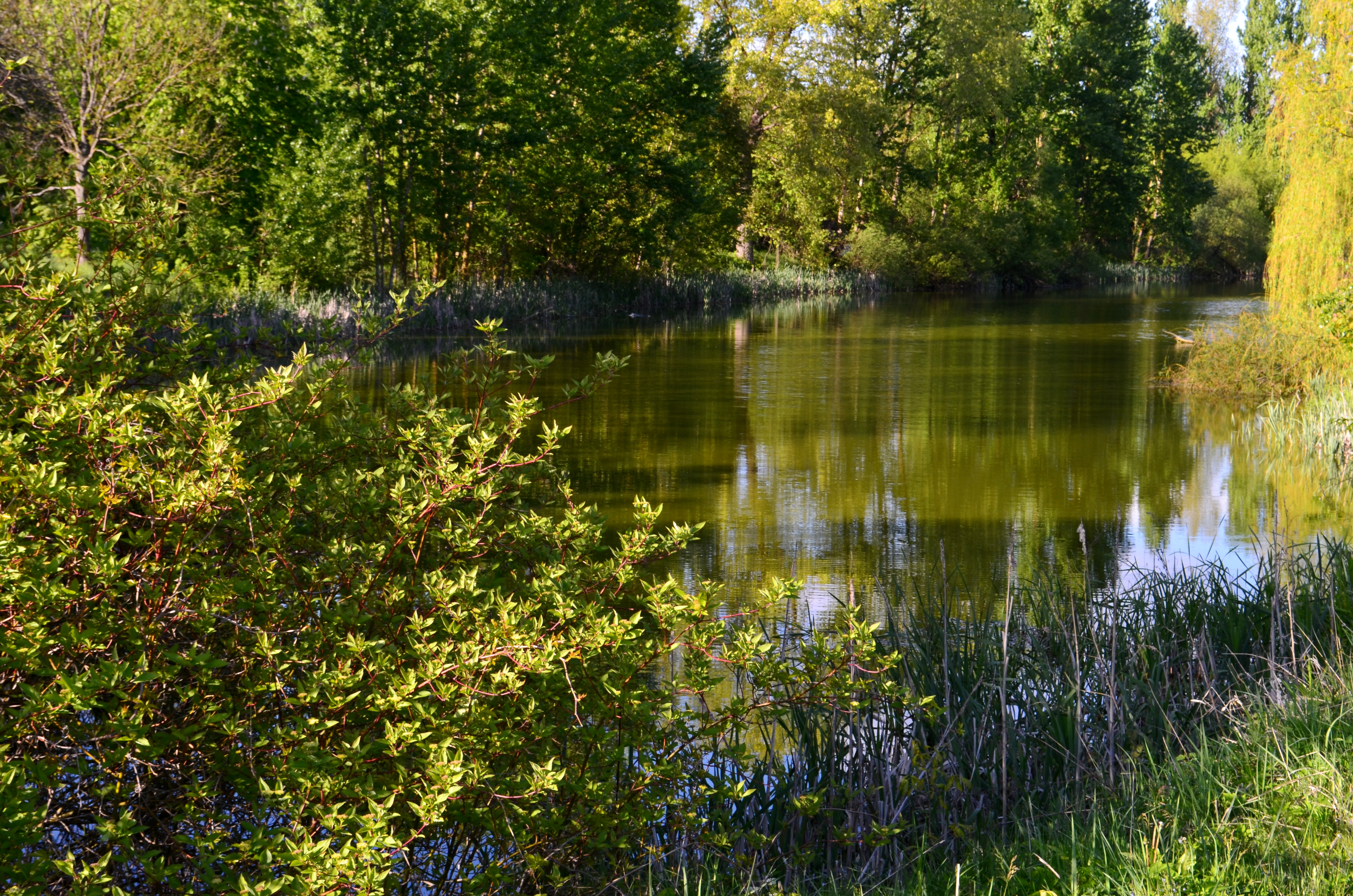
Zabieliškis pond
