= Rietavas =

- Town
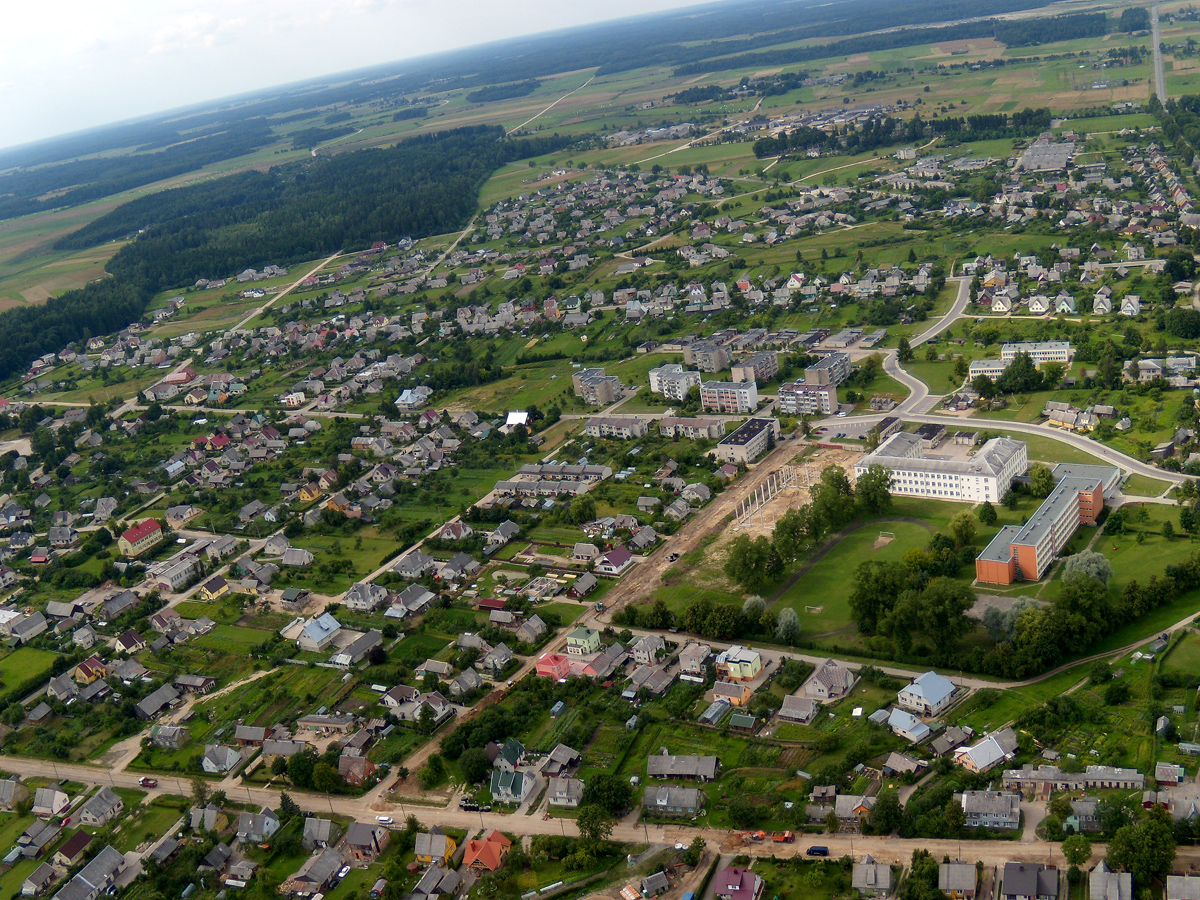

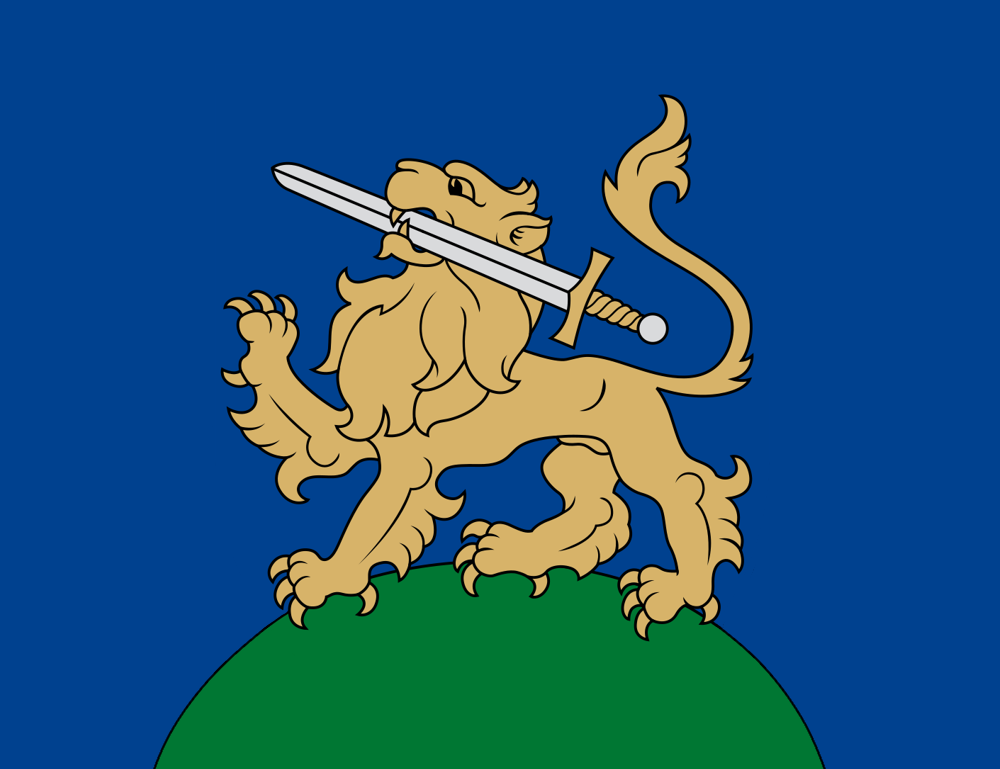
- Flag Coat of arms

- Location of Rietavas
- Coordinates: 55°43′0″N 21°56′0″E
- Country: Lithuania
- Ethnographic region: Samogitia
- County: Telšiai County
- Municipality: Rietavas municipality
- Eldership: Rietavas town eldership
- Capital of: Rietavas municipality Rietavas city eldership Rietavas rural eldership
- First mentioned: 1253
- Granted town rights: 1792

Population (2021)
  - Total: 3,234
- Time zone: UTC+2 (EET)
  - Summer (DST): UTC+3 (EEST)
- Website: http://www.rietavas.lt

Rietavas (Samogitian: Rėitavs; Polish: Retów) is a town in Lithuania on the Jūra River. According to the 2001 census it had a population of 3,979. It is the capital of Rietavas municipality.

The town is famous for building the first power station to produce electricity in Lithuania in 1892. The first telephone line in Lithuania was also built here.

== History ==
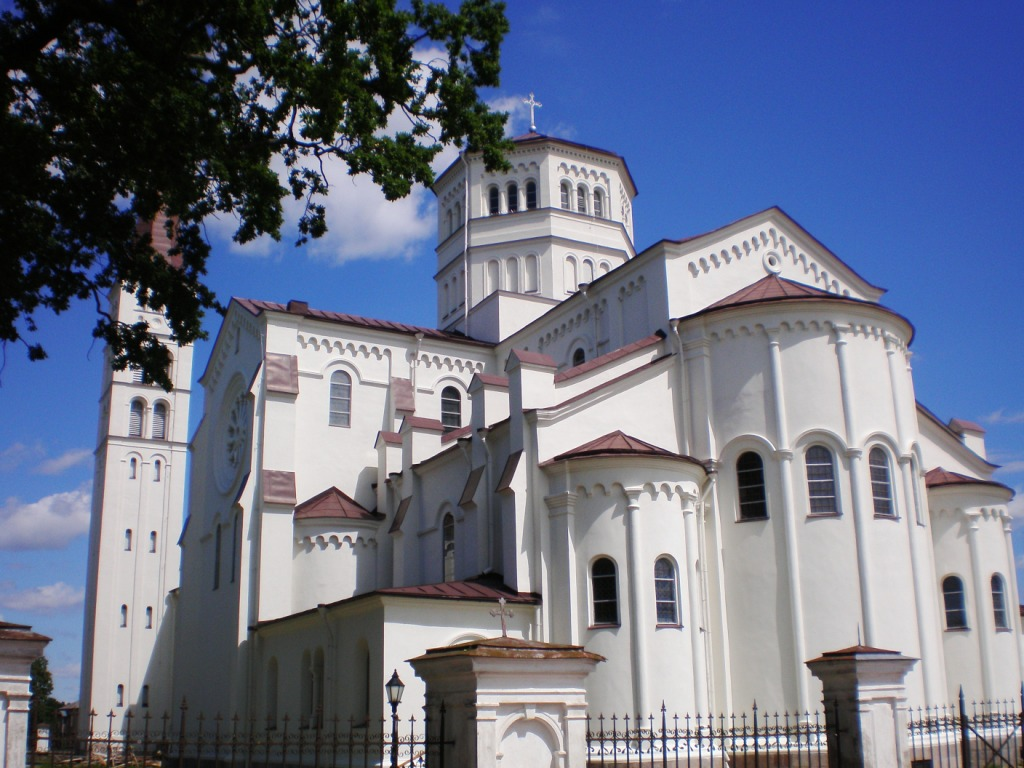
St. Michael Church in Rietavas

Rietavas was first mentioned in written sources around 1253. During the Middle Ages it belonged to Ceklis land. Rietavas' eldership was mentioned in 1527. Since 1533 Rietavas was known as a town however the town rights were not granted until 1792. In the 14th and 15th centuries Rietavas was one of the most important defence centres in Samogitia and also a crossing of commercial roads. It was located in the Duchy of Samogitia in the Grand Duchy of Lithuania within the Polish–Lithuanian Commonwealth.

In the 19th century Rietavas was an important educational centre as between 1812 and 1909 it belonged to Ogiński family, who loved culture and education. In 1835 there was established a hospital and four year later a parish school. In 1859 the school of agriculture was established in Rietavas, which was closed in 1863. Lithuanian was the official language of this school (there were any other such schools where Lithuanian would be an official language at that time). In 1873 current Catholic Church reflecting features of Romanesque Revival architecture was built.

Rietavas also became an important centre of progressive technologies of that time. In 1882 the first telephone line in Lithuania was built. It connected Rietavas and Plungė cities. In 1892 started to produce electricity the first power station in Lithuania. On 17 April 1892 in Easter the first street lights were turned on in Rietavas manor, park and church.

In 1915 Rietavas was the centre of the county and later on centre of the eldership. During the Inter-war period there were established a public library in 1928, a cinema in 1931.

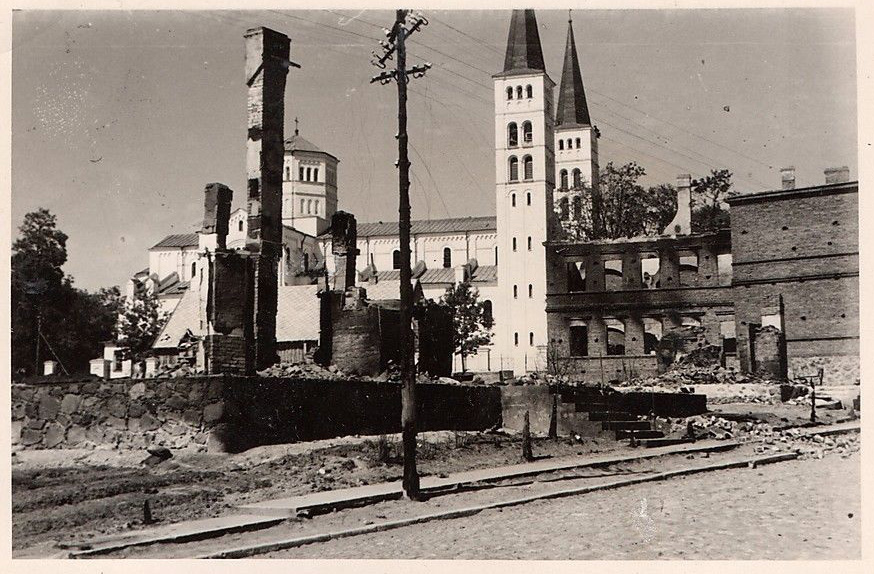
Rietavas city centre in June 1941

During World War II, the town was under Soviet occupation from 1940, and then under German occupation from 1941 to 1944. The Jewish Community was entirely destroyed by the Nazis and their Lithuanian collaborators. The Jews of Rietavas dealt in trade and crafts and provided their labor as plasterers, carpenters and blacksmiths. The first known census of the Jews in Rietavas was in 1662, when they numbered 421. Rietavas reached the zenith of its Jewish population around the end of the 19th century. In the 1897 census the total population numbered 1,750 of which 1,397 were Jewish. In 1882, Tsar Alexander III published legislation that restricted Jewish residence in the Russian Empire to small towns and villages, making farming impossible for the Jews in the rural areas or industry in the cities. This led to Jewish emigration, particularly to South Africa. In 1923, there 868 Jews out of a total population of 1,720. By 1940 there were 500 Jews. During WWII, in 1941, the local Jewish population were subjected to forced labor and then murdered in mass executions In 1959 when the total population had grown to 2,882, there was only one Jew left in the town. After the World War II Rietavas became the centre of district municipality however in 1963 it was merged with Plungė district municipality. Nevertheless, Rietavas retrieved its municipality in 2000.The city is also near regional roads KK164 and KK197 .

The coat of arms of Rietavas was approved by the decree of the President in 1996.

== Notable people ==
- Laurynas Ivinskis - Lithuanian teacher, publisher, translator and lexicographer.
- Diana Žiliūtė - Lithuanian racing cyclist, olympic medalist.
- Susman Brothers - businessmen in Rhodesia

== Twin towns – sister cities ==
Rietavas is twinned with:

- Gulbene, Latvia
- Kętrzyn (rural gmina), Poland
- Saerbeck, Germany
