= Karolina Proniewska =

19th-century Polish-Lithuanian writer

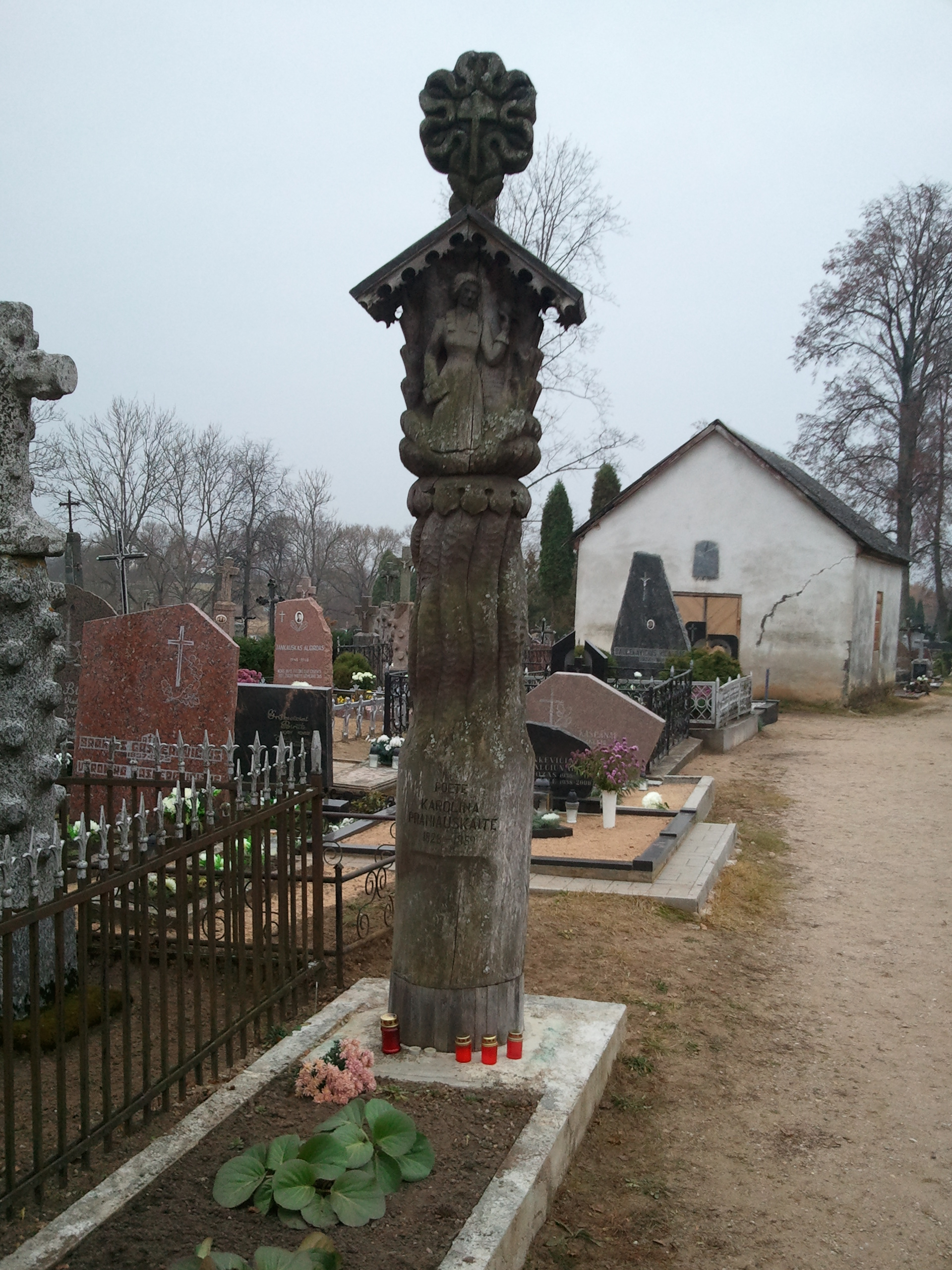
Karolina Proniewska grave in Utena Cemetery (exact place of burial is unknown)

Karolina Proniewska or Karolina Praniauskaitė (1828–1859) was a romantic Polish-Lithuanian poet and translator. Born in Samogitia, a historical region of Lithuania, then part of the Russian Empire, she is sometimes referred to as a Samogitian Bard. She is also considered the first Lithuanian female poet.

She wrote her original works exclusively in Polish and her poetry published in a single tome Piosneczki (Songs, 1858) initially gained much popularity. However, she also translated numerous works by Polish authors into the Lithuanian language, both in prose and in verse. She is considered one of the first women in the history of Lithuanian literature.

Her own poetry and translations, although popular during her lifetime, are today not widely read. She is remembered largely for her association with Antanas Baranauskas, who became a prominent Lithuanian poet, and one of the classic authors in that language, and whom she is said to have persuaded to write in the Lithuanian language.

== Life and works ==
Karolina Anna Proniewska was born into a szlachta noble family in Samogitia, then under Imperial Russian rule. She was born 18 January 1828 in Padubysys Telšiai in a small manor where Polish culture predominated. Her father, Teofil Proniewski of Korwin, was an assessor at the local court, while her mother was Eleonora née Dobszewicz. Proniewska started to write poems at the age of seven. Her father died when she was seven and her mother had difficulties supporting both the manor and the family.

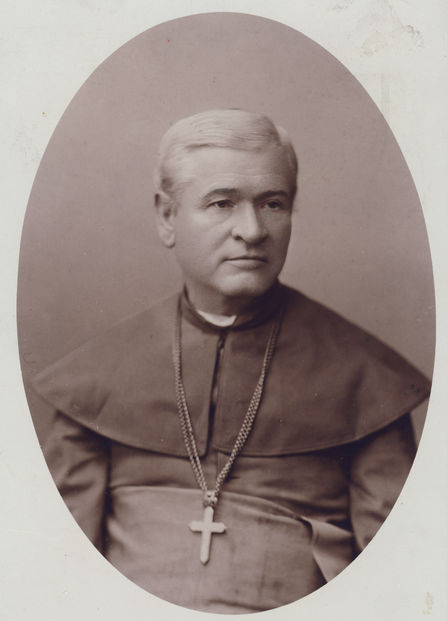
Antanas Baranauskas

Three of Karolina's brothers belonged to a close circle of Lithuanian intellectuals who were deeply involved with the growing Lithuanian national movement. As a girl she suffered from tuberculosis, and her eldest brother forbade her to read any books or write poetry, which he supposed would harm her already poor health. She disobeyed. Soon she moved to Telšiai, where she started working as a teacher. Another of her brothers, Otton Proniewski, the personal secretary to the Bishop of Samogitia Motiejus Valančius, financed the publication of a book of her poems, which made her regionally famous, partly due to publications in the Gazeta Warszawska, one of the most respected Polish-language newspapers of the time.

Strongly influenced by Adam Mickiewicz's romantic poetry, she is known to have devoted at least one poem to him. Although her published original works were written in the Polish language, with time she also made several translations of Polish-language classics into Lithuanian. Among the most notable of these translations is Matka węży by Józef Ignacy Kraszewski. The translation is said to have had an unprecedented impact on Lithuanian culture as a fundamental work of Lithuanian high art, and to have been much of a much higher quality than her own dilettantish Polish verses.

In 1855, through her sister Tekla, she met Antanas Baranauskas, a young poet then working as a clerk at the nearby farm in Seda. Proniewska instilled into Baranauskas a love for the Lithuanian language and culture, and convinced him to start writing his poems in the Lithuanian language. Baranauskas wrote a poem in her honor, which became his poetic debut in 1857, D Karoliny P. The couple started to exchange letters and, with time, poems. Her brother Otton helped Baranauskas pass his entrance examinations into the Catholic school in Varniai, one of the few venues then open to a member of the lower social strata for attaining an education in 19th century Russia. Baranauskas went on to become a scholar of the Lithuanian language, and wrote what has been described as one of the greatest works in Lithuanian literature, Anykščių šilelis (The Forest of Anykščiai). He also went on to become a Roman Catholic bishop.

It is commonly accepted that Proniewska had been his friend and patron. However, prior to her death, she requested that all of their letters and her diaries be burned, and little documentation of their relationship has survived. She died at the age of 31, on 26 May 1859, and was buried at a cemetery in Utena, where she spent the last months of her life. No pictures of her have survived. Her exact burial place is unknown, but an oak commemorative sculpture at the Utena cemetery bears her name, as does the Telšiai Public Library.

== Bibliography ==
- Jackiewicz, Mieczysław (1999). Literatura litewska w Polsce w XIX i XX wieku [Lithuanian literature in Poland in the 19th and 20th centuries] (in Polish). Olsztyn: Wydawnictwa Wyższej Szkoły Pedagogicznej w Olsztynie.
- Skwara, Marta (2018). "Polish Literature and its Languages". In Trojanowska, Tamara; Niżyńska, Joanna; Czapliński, Przemysław (eds.). Being Poland: A New History of Polish Literature and Culture since 1918. Toronto: University of Toronto Press. ISBN 978-1-4426-5018-3.
- Gajkowska, Cecylia (1985). "Karolina Anna Proniewska". Internetowy Polski Słownik Biograficzny (in Polish). Archived from the original on 2019-12-26.
- Jackiewicz, Mieczysław (2010). "Biskup Antoni Baranowski i jego „Borek oniksztyński"". Przegląd Wschodni (in Polish). 1 (41). ISSN 0867-5929.
