= Kolainiai =

- Village
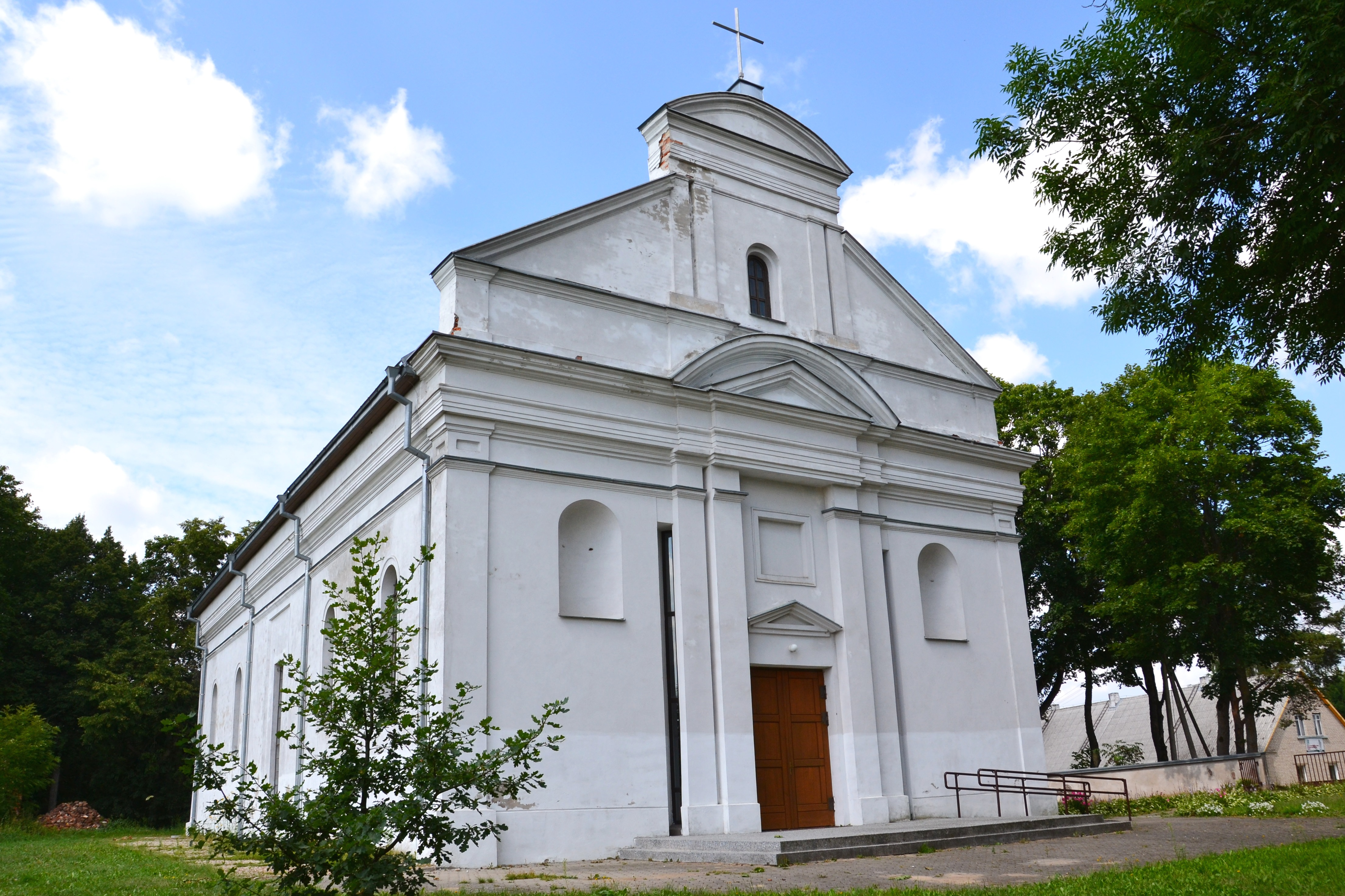
- Kolainiai Roman Catholic Church

- Location of Kolainiai
- Coordinates: 55°45′N 22°36′E
- Country: Lithuania
- Ethnographic region: Samogitia
- County: Šiauliai County
- Municipality: Kelmė District Municipality
- Eldership: Užventis eldership
- First mentioned: 1512

Population (2011)
  - Total: 261
- Time zone: UTC+2 (EET)
  - Summer (DST): UTC+3 (EEST)

Kolainiai is a village in Kelmė District Municipality, Lithuania. It is located about 5 kilometres (3.1 mi) southwest of Užventis. According to the 2011 census, its population was 261.

In 1750, local noble Adamkavičius bequeathed his manor and land with serfs to the Carmelites. He also built a monastery and a church for the monks. In 1797, the monks took over the administration of the Kražiai College, a former Jesuit school. After Tsarist authorities secularized the college in 1817, the Carmelites established their school in Kolainiai. The school was closed in 1835 after the November Uprising. The monastery itself was closed after the January Uprising of 1863. Russian settlers from Blagoveshchensk (Amur Oblast) were moved into the monastery; the town became known as Blagoveshchenskoye (Russian: Благовещенское). The Catholic Church was converted into an Eastern Orthodox church. Catholics reclaimed the church in 1922 after Lithuania declared independence in 1918.

In 1940, one of the residential homes of Kolainiai was converted into an Orthodox church by the local Orthodox residents, dedicated to the Smolensk icon of the Mother of God. The church was officially registered in 1947 with the government. Services are offered several times a year by visiting clergy.
