= Jurgis Pabrėža =

Lithuanian Franciscan priest (1771-1849)

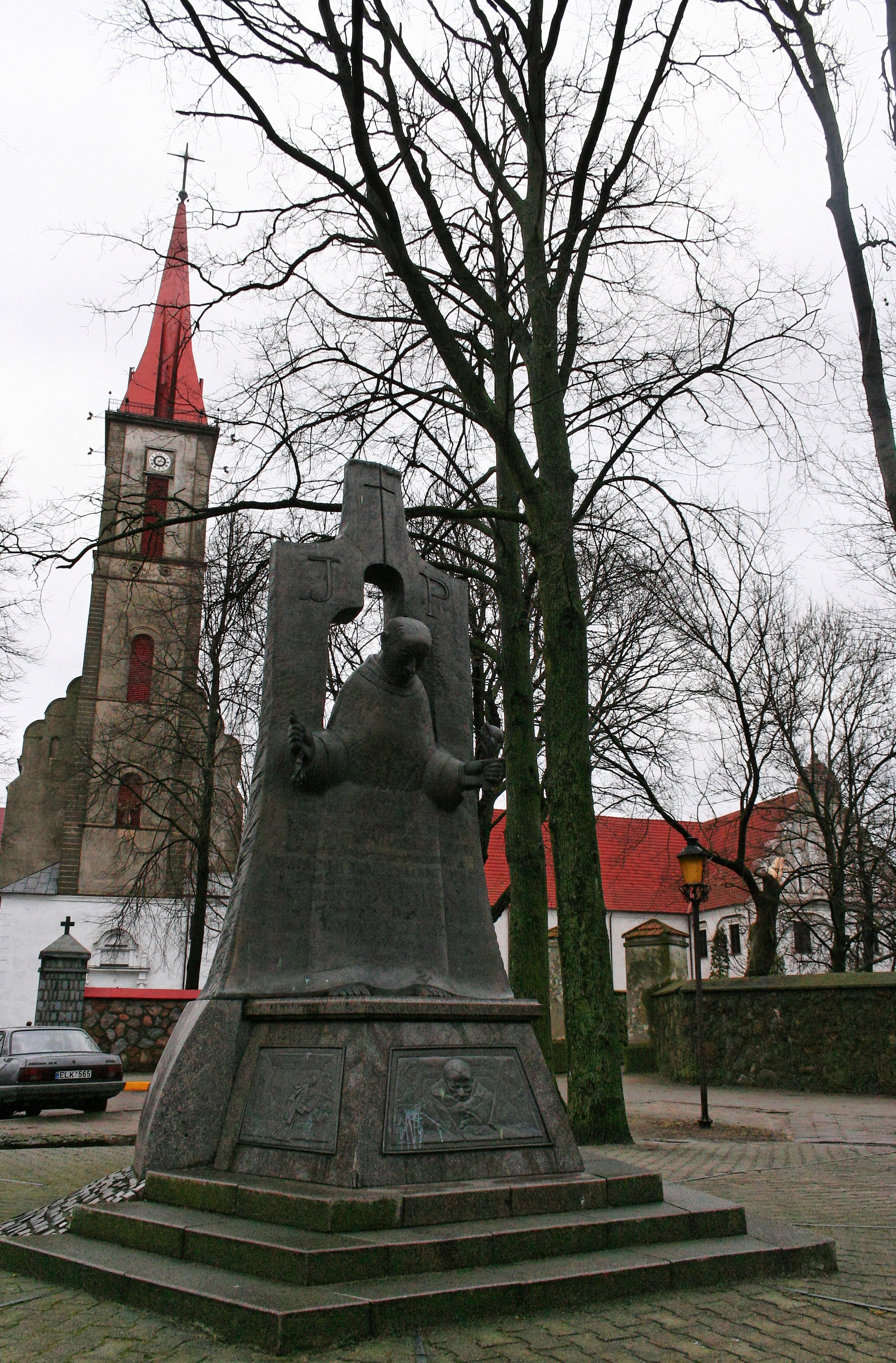
The Jurgis Pabrėža monument

Father Jurgis Ambrozijus (Ambraziejus) Pabrėža (born 15 January 1771 in Večiai, Skuodas District Municipality; died 30 October 1849 in Kretinga) was a Lithuanian Franciscan priest, botanist, and educator. He created first systematic guide of Lithuanian flora Taislius auguminis (Botany), written in Samogitian dialect, the Latin-Lithuanian dictionary of plant names, and the first Lithuanian textbook of geography.
