= The Forest of Anykščiai =

Lithuanian poem

The Forest of Anykščiai (Lithuanian: Anykščių šilelis), written by Antanas Baranauskas and published in 1861 by Laurynas Ivinskis, is a landmark poem in the history of the Lithuanian literature.

The poem expresses the long-standing connection between the Lithuanian people and their forests. It was inspired by poetry of Adam Mickiewicz and bears similarities to the romantic poetry of Wordsworth and similar works of the early 19th century, but conveys additional meanings related to the perceived oppression of the country during its 19th-century inclusion in the Russian Empire.
