= Daubiškiai =

- Village
- Location within Lithuania
- Coordinates: 56°08′30″N 22°47′30″E
- Country: Lithuania
- County: Šiauliai County
- Municipality: Akmenė

Population (2021)
  - Total: 359
- Time zone: UTC+2 (EET)
  - Summer (DST): UTC+3 (EEST)

Daubiškiai is a village in Akmenė district municipality, in Šiauliai County, northwest Lithuania. According to the 2021 census, the village has a population of 359 people. It is south of Papilė, on the left bank of the Venta River, (on the other bank is Papilė). The 1011 Papilė–Gumbakiai–Švendriai road passes through the village.
