= Simonas Daukantas =

Lithuanian historian and writer (1793–1864)

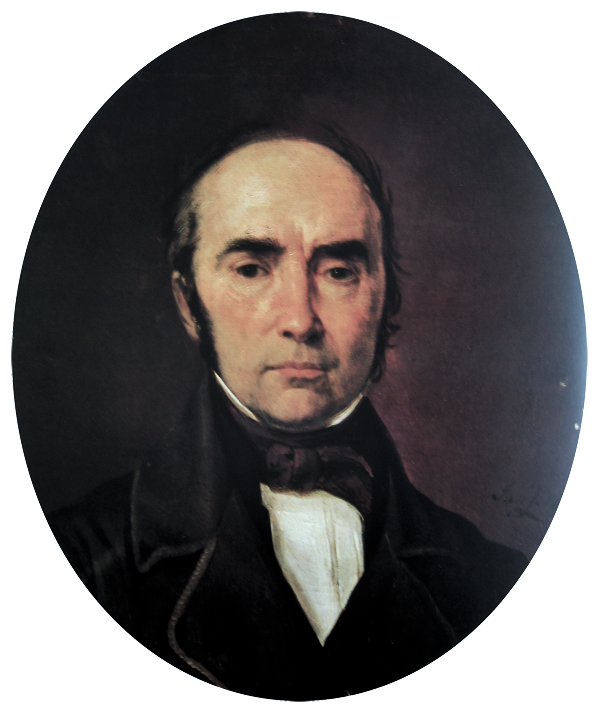
- Portrait of Daukantas (oil on canvas)
- Born: 28 October 1793; Kalviai, Polish–Lithuanian Commonwealth
- Died: 6 December 1864 (aged 71); Papilė, Russian Empire
- Other name: Szymon Dowkont
- Education: Vilnius University
- Occupations: Historian, non-fiction writer
- Notable work: The Character of the Ancient Lithuanians, Highlanders, and Samogitians
- Movement: Lithuanian National Revival

Simonas Daukantas (Polish: Szymon Dowkont; 28 October 1793 – 6 December 1864) was a Lithuanian/Samogitian historian, writer, and ethnographer. One of the pioneers of the Lithuanian National Revival, he is credited as the author of the first book on the history of Lithuania written in the Lithuanian language. Only a few of his works were published during his lifetime and he died in obscurity. However, his works were rediscovered during the later stages of the National Revival. His views reflected the three major trends of the 19th century: romanticism, nationalism, and liberalism.

Daukantas was born in Samogitia to a Lithuanian family. Likely a son of free peasants, he later produced proof of his noble birth to get university degree and a promotion in his government job. He attended schools in Kretinga and Žemaičių Kalvarija and was noted as an excellent student. Daukantas studied law at the University of Vilnius, though his interest lay in philology and history. After the graduation, he worked as a civil servant of the Russian Empire from 1825 to 1850. He first worked at the office of the Governor-General of Livonia, Estonia and Courland in Riga then moved to Saint Petersburg to work at the Governing Senate. At the Senate, he had the opportunity to study the Lithuanian Metrica, the state archive of the 14–18th century legal documents of the Grand Duchy of Lithuania. In 1850, Daukantas retired from his job due to poor health and moved back to Samogitia where he lived in Varniai under the care of bishop Motiejus Valančius for a few years. He hoped to publish some of his works with bishop's help, but the bishop prioritized religious work and they began to quarrel. In 1855, Daukantas moved to Jaunsvirlauka in present-day Latvia and later to Papilė where he died in obscurity in 1864.

While Daukantas knew seven languages, he published exclusively in Lithuanian. He was a prolific writer and worked on a wide range of books – studies on the history of Lithuania, publications of primary historical sources, collections of Lithuanian folklore, Polish–Lithuanian dictionaries, Latin textbook for schoolchildren, primer of the Lithuanian language, Catholic prayer book, agricultural manuals for peasants, translations of classical Roman texts, novel for youth inspired by Robinson Crusoe. However, only a few of these works were published during his lifetime. Of the four studies on history, he managed to publish only one, The Character of the Ancient Lithuanians, Highlanders, and Samogitians, in 1845. While he was a well read erudite who spent considerable time and effort in obtaining primary sources, his historical works are highly influenced by romantic nationalism and didactically idealize the past. He used poetic descriptions, rhetorical elements, and emotional language that brought his history works closer to a literary work. His histories are valued not for their scientific content, but for their contribution to the development of the Lithuanian national identity. After the closing of Vilnius University in 1832, Lithuanians did not have a professionally trained historian until 1904 and used Daukantas' histories extensively. Daukantas identified language as the determining factor of nationality and articulated the nationalist anti-Polish sentiment that became the fundamental ideas of the Lithuanian National Revival and that survive in Lithuanian historiography into the 21st century.

== Biography ==
=== Origins and primary education ===
Daukantas was born on 28 October 1793 in Kalviai near Lenkimai in Samogitia. He was the oldest of seven children (two sons and five daughters). With Daukantas' help, his brother Aleksandras later studied medicine at Vilnius University. Baptismal records of the two sons (but not of the daughters) specified that they were children of Lithuanian nobles. There was an academic debate whether this information was accurate or falsified to provide the sons with better opportunities in life, a common practice among wealthier peasants at the time. An analysis of inventories of Skuodas Manor revealed that the family were free peasants – different from serfs in that they had some personal freedoms and paid quit-rent instead of performing corvée. When the manor was confiscated from the Sapiehas for their participation in the Uprising of 1831, the family was turned into serfs. However, Eimantas Meilus argued that inventories alone do not prove that the family was not of noble origin as many poorer nobles were equated to peasants and paid quit-rent to wealthier manors. The family worked about 1.5 voloks of land and pasture and raised cash for quit-rent by selling flax in Riga or Liepāja. According to the epitaph engraved on the gravestone of Daukantas' mother, she and her husband participated in a battle near Liepāja during the Kościuszko Uprising against the partitions of the Polish–Lithuanian Commonwealth. In 1799–1800, his father was mentioned as manor's forester.

Daukantas' education was financed by his uncle, priest Simonas Lopacinskis (died in 1814). Daukantas attended a two-year primary school in Kretinga. When the school was visited by an inspector from Vilnius University in 1808, Daukantas was listed among 16 exemplary second-year students (out of total 68 students). The school curriculum included lessons on Polish and Latin grammar, geography, arithmetic, religion and morality. At some point, Daukantas enrolled into a four-grade six-year (the last two grades took two years to finish) school in Žemaičių Kalvarija. Another inspector listed him as one of four best students in the last fourth grade in 1814. The school curriculum was dictated by Vilnius University and included natural law (textbook by Hieronim Stroynowski), classical antiquity, rhetoric, geography, geometry, algebra, physics, natural sciences (textbook by Stanisław Bonifacy Jundziłł), gardening. However, since all teachers were Dominican friars, students had to attend daily masses and go to confession every month. The subjects were taught in Polish and the use of Samogitian (Lithuanian), even among students, was prohibited in November 1806. The official rationale was to facilitate the learning of Polish. However, as later attested by Motiejus Valančius, neither students nor teachers knew Polish well and Daukantas never learned proper Polish pronunciation.

In 1814, Daukantas with 10 rubles in his pocket and a bag of clothes on his back traveled on foot from Samogitia to Vilnius to attend Vilnius Gymnasium. The school year started on 1 September, but Daukantas was registered only on 26 September as a fifth-year student. That school year, the school had 423 students, mostly sons of nobles and officials. The gymnasium, together with Vilnius in general, was recovering after the French invasion of Russia in 1812. Its original premises were occupied by a war hospital and so it temporarily shared rooms with Vilnius University. In June–July 1815, the gymnasium organized an annual public examination of its students attended by members of the clergy and university professors. Daukantas was listed among 14 students who distinguished themselves during this event. He successfully graduated from the gymnasium in early summer 1816.

=== University education ===
In fall 1816, Daukantas began studies at the Faculty of Literature and Liberal Arts at Vilnius University, then known as the Imperial University of Vilna. Adam Mickiewicz transferred to the faculty at the same time. Daukantas was interested in philology and studied Latin, Russian, and Polish literature, French language, rhetoric, poetry, natural and land law (leges patrias). His professors included Gottfried Ernst Groddeck of classical philology and Leon Borowski of poetry and rhetoric. In 1817, Daukantas applied for a Candidate of Philosophy degree, but was rejected because he did not provide required certificates and did not complete a thesis. After another year of studies, Daukantas transferred to the Faculty of Moral and Political Sciences in fall 1818. These studies could secure a more promising career as a judge or a government official. He attended lectures of Ignacy Żegota Onacewicz, who formed Daukantas as a historian. Onacewicz studied at the University of Königsberg and had access to the archives of the Teutonic Order and spent a year studying archives at the estate of Nikolay Rumyantsev in Gomel. He collected enough information to establish a course on the history of Lithuania as a separate subject from the history of Poland. Another key professor was Ignacy Daniłowicz who taught law and studied Lithuanian Statutes, Casimir's Code, and Lithuanian Chronicles.

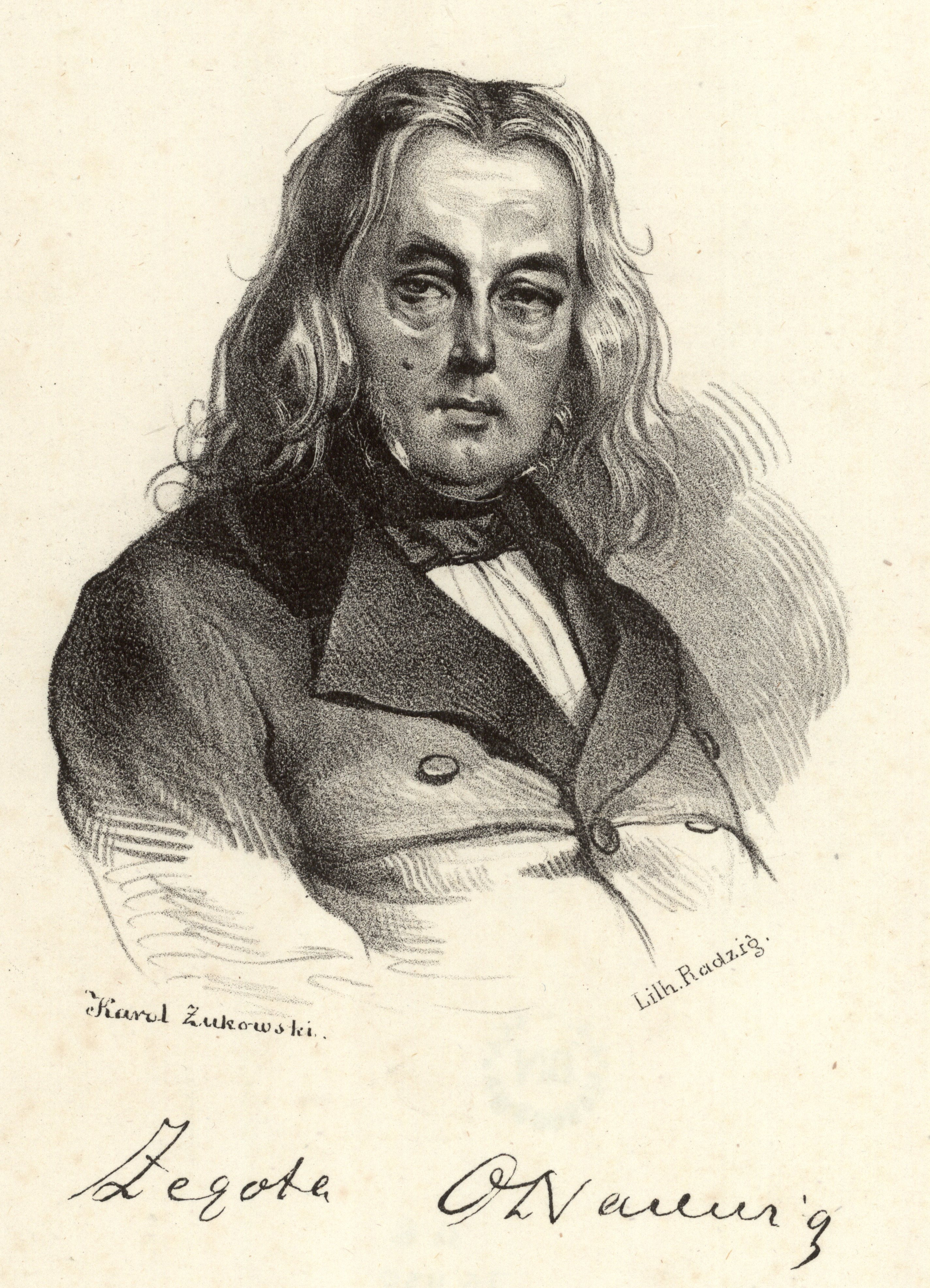
Professor Ignacy Żegota Onacewicz, who influenced Daukantas as a historian

On 12 July 1819, Daukantas was granted the Candidate of Law degree in canon and Roman law. To get the diploma, Daukantas needed to provide proof of his noble status. He provided a large parchment, signed by Michał Józef Römer as marshal of the szlachta of the Vilna Governorate on 24 August 1820, that described an extensive genealogy of Daukantai family of Olawa coat of arms that traced back to the late 1500s. While the document is authentic, historian Vytautas Merkys concluded that Daukantas altered the genealogy to attach his own family to the noble Daukantai family, another known practice among peasants that shared surnames with noble families. Daukantas received his diploma on 25 January 1821.

He continued his studies and took canon law, Roman civil law, criminal law, land law, political economy, history, logic and metaphysics. From fall 1820, Daukantas stopped attending lectures except for land law. He stopped taking classes in spring 1822. In all classes he received "good" or "very good" evaluations except in logic and metaphysics taught by Anioł Dowgird where his knowledge was rated as "satisfactory". In spring 1821, Daukantas submitted an application for a master's degree. The oral exams took place in October–November 1821. He had to answer questions on a wide variety of subjects, from the law and history of Ancient Rome and impostors of Dmitry of Uglich to theory of taxes and specifics of Russian economy as well as thoughts of Montesquieu and Adam Smith. In July 1822, Daukantas defended his thesis on the power of the head of a family according to the natural, Roman, and land law. He was granted the master's degree in canon and Roman law on 15 July 1822.

However, Daukantas had to wait until 1825 to get his diploma. The degree needed a confirmation by the Ministry of Religious Affairs and Public Education. The university prepared the papers in August 1822, but they were returned because they needed translation into Russian. The translated documents were not sent out until March 1824. Part of the delay was caused by suppression of the Filomat and Filaret secret student societies (Daukantas' name was included on a list of potential members, but there is no evidence that he ever joined them). Discovered in May 1823, members of these societies were tried and sentenced for anti-Tsarist activities. Until resolution of the trials, students were prohibited from leaving Vilnius and the university ceased issuing graduation certificates. The process was delayed again due to the replacement of Adam Jerzy Czartoryski, curator of the Vilnius educational district, with Nikolay Novosiltsev. The papers had to be reviewed by the new curator who approved Daukantas' degree in February 1825 followed by the ministry's approval in March. Finally, the university issued the diploma on 30 April 1825.

There is no reliable information on Daukantas' activities while he waited for his diploma. Earlier biographers claimed that he studied at the Imperial University of Dorpat, but researchers Vaclovas Biržiška and Antanas Tyla found no record of Daukantas among Dorpat students. Jonas Šliūpas claimed that Daukantas visited France, Germany, England, while other authors claimed that he studied historical documents at the Königsberg archives, but there is no record that he was issued a passport that would have allowed him to leave Vilnius. Daukantas likely joined a small circle of Samogitian students that promised to promote Lithuanian language and culture signifying the early stages of the Lithuanian National Revival. There a popular legend that he went to the Gate of Dawn and promised to write only in Lithuanian. Already in 1822, he wrote Darbai senųjų lietuvių ir žemaičių (Deeds of the Ancient Lithuanians and Samogitians), an 855-page manuscript on the history of Lithuania. While it was not published until 1929, two copies of the manuscript are known. Researcher Roma Bončkutė proposed that Daukantas was inspired to write the work after reading The Seasons by Kristijonas Donelaitis, first published by Ludwig Rhesa in 1818. In 1824, Daukantas translated 111 fables of Phaedrus, but they remained unpublished until 1846.

=== Civil servant ===
With his master's diploma in hand, Daukantas searched for a position in a government office. In September 1825, he was issued a passport that allowed him to travel to the Governorates of Livonia and Saint Petersburg. He found a post at the office of the Governor-General of Livonia, Estonia and Courland in Riga. All government officials in the Russian Empire were divided into 14 categories, from imperial ministers to train conductors (see: Table of Ranks). In 1826, Daukantas was recognized as a titular councillor, 9th category official. For a promotion to collegiate assessor he needed to prove his noble status and have three years of experience. In February 1826, Tsar Nicholas I of Russia ordered to prepare a new law that would require all nobles to prove their social status. While the law was adopted only in May 1834, it became a lot more difficult to prove one's noble birth. Daukantas and his brother Aleksandras, then a student at Vilnius University, had to resubmit all documents proving their genealogy to a special commission of Vilna Governorate. The commission recognized both brothers as nobles and forwarded documents to Heroldia under the Governing Senate in January 1832. In May 1833, Heroldia recognized Daukantas as noble, but not his brother. Daukantas was promoted to the 8th category in April 1834.

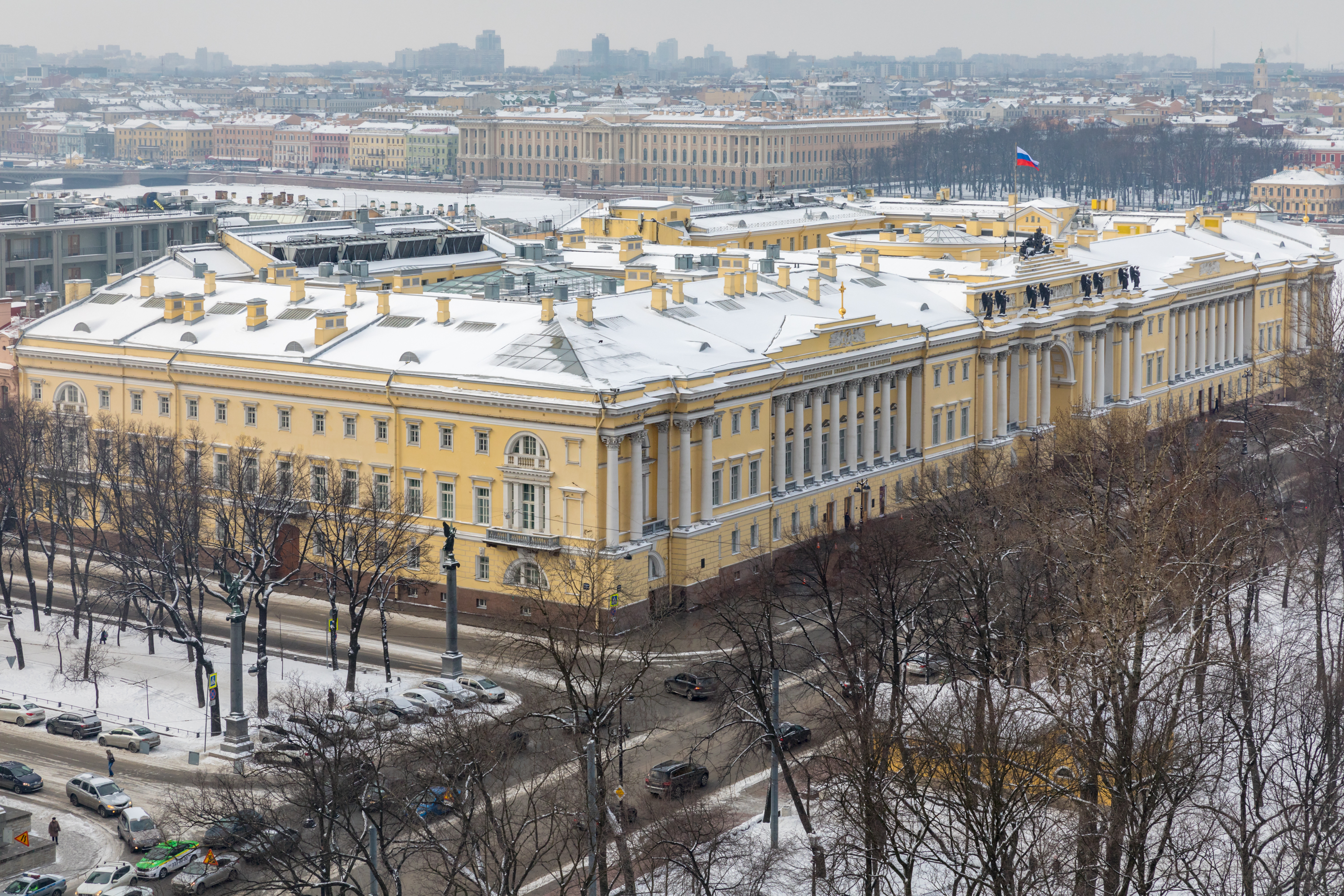
Building of the Senate and the Synod where Daukantas worked from 1835 to 1850

During the Uprising of 1831, Daukantas was in Riga – he was not granted vacations between December 1829 and July 1834. In 1833, he received two awards of 75 and 110 rubles for excellent work. We was interested in the history of Lithuania, but could not get access to the archives of Riga magistrate. After the promotion, he decided to change his position and move to Saint Petersburg. He applied for a job at the first (administrative) department of the Governing Senate. After a background check to ensure that he did not participate in the uprising, Daukantas started his new job in March 1835. He worked on paperwork related to ports and Russian Imperial Navy. In March 1837, he transferred to the third department which dealt with all kinds of cases, complaints, and appeals from eastern governorates of the Russian Empire, including Vilna and Kovno. Daukantas was attracted to this position because the office used Lithuanian Metrica, a collection of the 14–18th century legal documents of the Grand Duchy of Lithuania. He became an assistant of Franciszek Malewski. His annual salary was 286 rubles with additional 57 rubles for food. It was a small pay and Daukantas earned additional money by helping various people to locate needed genealogical and other documents in the Metrica. In July 1839, Daukantas received an award equal to his annual pay for helping create a practical index of the Metrica. However, he did not receive either Order of Saint Anna (2nd class) or the Order of Saint Stanislaus (2nd class) which were generally awarded after 12 and 15 years of employment.

In February 1841, Daukantas' brother Aleksandras was implicated in an anti-Tsarist organization established by Szymon Konarski. After an interrogation, he attempted suicide and was brought to a hospital in Kherson. He died in the hospital on 5 October 1841. More repressions and restrictions, including stricter censorship, followed after the Revolutions of 1848. Afraid of attracting police attention and losing his job, Daukantas kept his historical research a secret and always asked friends and acquaintances not to publish or mention his name. He used numerous non-repeating pen names and a few times published works without any name, though some researchers suggested that he also did that to create an impression that there were many Lithuanian writers. Even when sending a copy of Būdas senovės lietuvių, kalnėnų ir žemaičių to Teodor Narbutt, Daukantas described the work as if written by an unknown person.

=== Collaboration with other historians ===
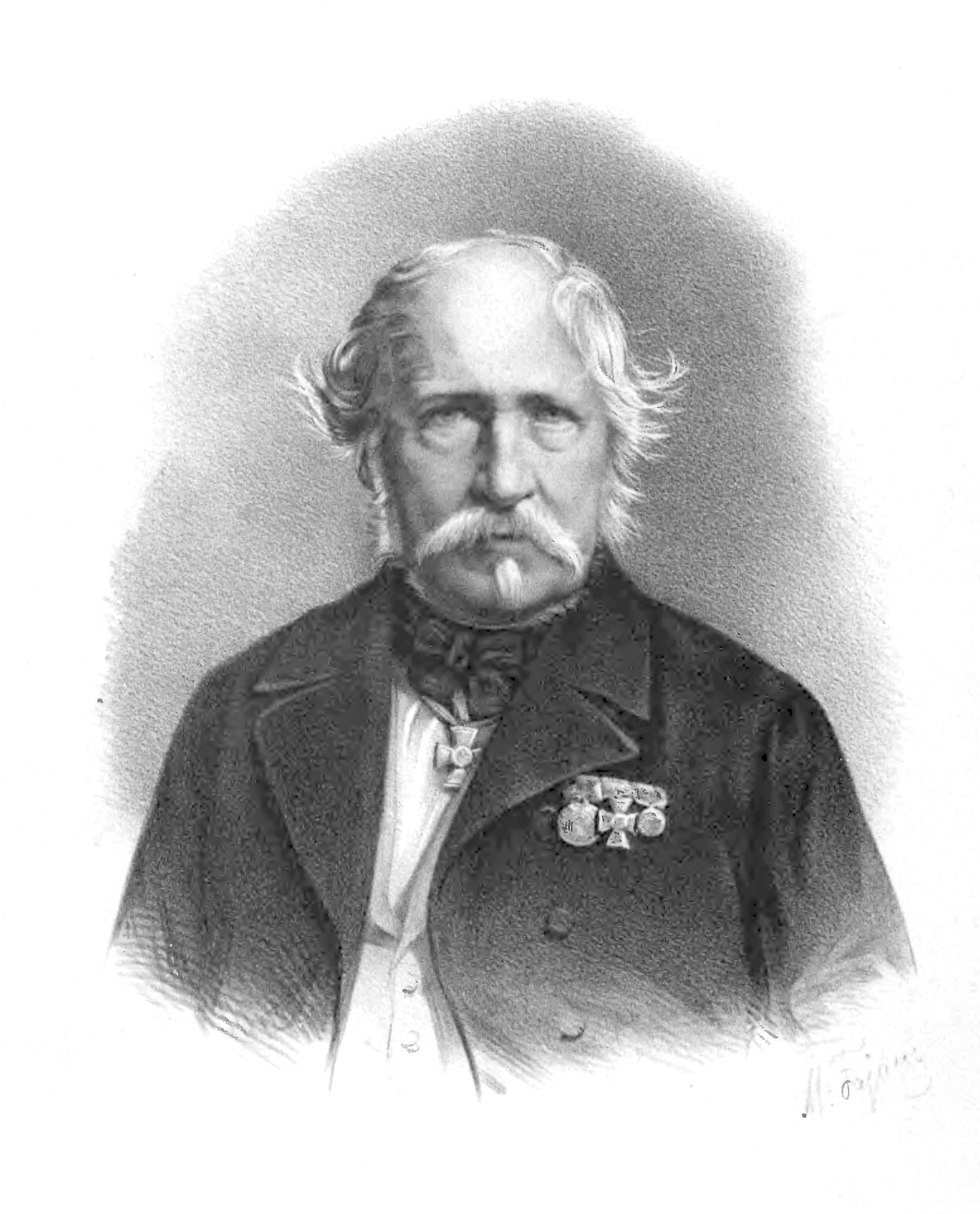
Daukantas and Teodor Narbutt hoped to publish various historical primary sources.

In Saint Petersburg, Daukantas worked on his studies on the history of Lithuania and was close friends with his former professor Ignacy Żegota Onacewicz and Vasily Anastasevich who both lived in an apartment provided by the Rumyantsev Museum. They both died in February 1845 and Daukantas deeply mourned his friends. When Vilnius Theological Academy was moved to Saint Petersburg in 1842, it brought more Lithuanian intellectuals to Saint Petersburg. Daukantas is often crediting for inspiring Motiejus Valančius, future Bishop of Samogitia, to write his works in Lithuanian. The small Samogitian circle was ruined when Jonas Krizostomas Gintila and Valančius returned to Lithuania in 1844–1845. However, Daukantas and Valančius continued to correspond and collaborate. It is likely that Valančius wrote his fundamental work on the history of the Diocese of Samogitia in Lithuanian and not in Polish because of Daukantas' influence. In this work, Valančius cited Daukantas' manuscript of Istorija žemaitiška four times and Lithuanian Metrica (copies of which he could have obtained only from Daukantas) another four times, though likely used Daukantas and his sources more frequently as Valančius mentioned a total of 19 Samogitian cities and towns that had received royal privileges.

Teodor Narbutt, author of the nine-volume History of Lithuania, began corresponding with Daukantas in March 1842. They exchanged books and materials. In total, Narbutt wrote 19 letters to Daukantas, and Daukantas wrote 20 letters to Narbutt. Their main concern was to obtain and publish historical documents and other primary sources related to the history of Lithuania. Daukantas was particularly wary of falsified or altered sources being published by various Polish historians. Their plan to publish primary sources was an intentional and principled decision to publish Lithuanian documents separately from Polish historians who began publishing Sources for the History of Poland (Źródła do dziejów Polski). Daukantas sent to Narbutt about 800 copies of various documents made during the years by himself or by Onacewicz, including a copy of Die Littauischen Wegeberichte. In particular, he highly valued a copy of a manuscript by Albert Wijuk Kojałowicz that cataloged and described various coat of arms of Lithuanian nobility. When Narbutt promised to find a way to publish the manuscript, Daukantas lent him the copy for a few months with strict orders to supervise the publication so that no Polish publishers could make any changes or alterations to the original text. Narbutt harbored plans to publish the Bychowiec Chronicle as the first volume of a series of primary source publications, but Daukantas lost his patience after receiving only promises of ever grander plans. Their collaboration broke down in 1844. Narbutt never published or returned the documents received from Daukantas who was angry over losing most valuable pieces of his collection and continued to demand their return until 1858. After Narbutt's death, his sons gifted some of the primary sources collected by their father, including 158 pages copied by Daukantas, to a library in Lviv (present-day Stefanyk National Science Library).

=== Retirement ===
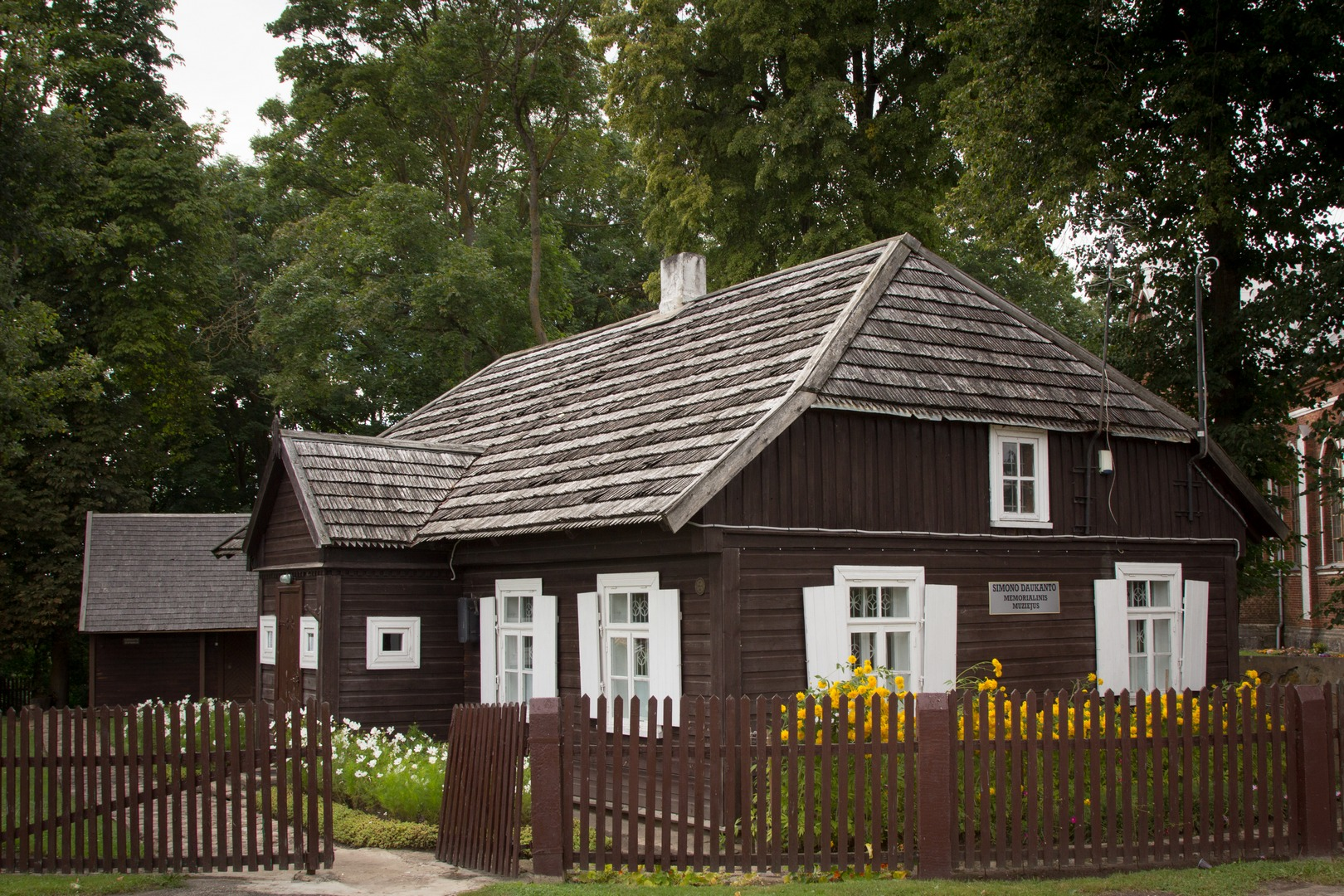
The clergy house in Papilė where Daukantas lived in 1861–1864 (now a memorial museum)

In an 1846 letter to Narbutt, Daukantas complained of poor health which he attributed to long hours spent in cold and damp archives of the Russian Senate. He complained that he had difficulty walking, but dismissed doctors' diagnosis of podagra. In summer 1850, he requested a three-month vacation to improve his health. In September, he obtained an official certificate from a German doctor in Telšiai that at the age of 58 and troubled by many ailments he was unfit to continue his work in Saint Petersburg. Daukantas was officially retired in February 1851 and allotted an annual pension of 42.90 silver rubles, but it was not enough to live on and he needed further financial support. His move to Lithuania coincided with the consecration of his old friend Motiejus Valančius as Bishop of Samogitia in March 1850. Daukantas lived in Varniai where Valnčius resided and which was becoming a cultural center in Samogitia. He received a salary of 200 rubles from Valančius and worked on his historical studies that he hoped to publish with Valančius' help. However, soon the relationship soured perhaps because Valančius prioritized religious work and literature and would assign tasks which had little to do with Lithuanian cultural work that Daukantas desired. Also, Valančius had a more critical approach to writing history and reportedly criticized Daukantas' overly idealized work and carefully controlled the language of Daukantas' historical works.

In summer 1855, Daukantas moved from Varniai. Historians usually cite the conflict between Daukantas and Valančius as the reason for the move, but ill health and fear of police persecution probably also contributed. Due to the Crimean War, Russian police became more vigilant and they came across Būdas senovės lietuvių, kalnėnų ir žemaičių that Daukantas had published in 1845. The censors reevaluated the book and deemed it inappropriate due to its anti-serfdom rhetoric. The police tracked down Daukantas and knew that he moved from Varniai to Courland. However, the book was already sold out and the investigation concluded with an order to keep an eye on bookstores in case a new edition of the book appeared. The book was one of the first books added to a list of prohibited books compiled in October 1855.

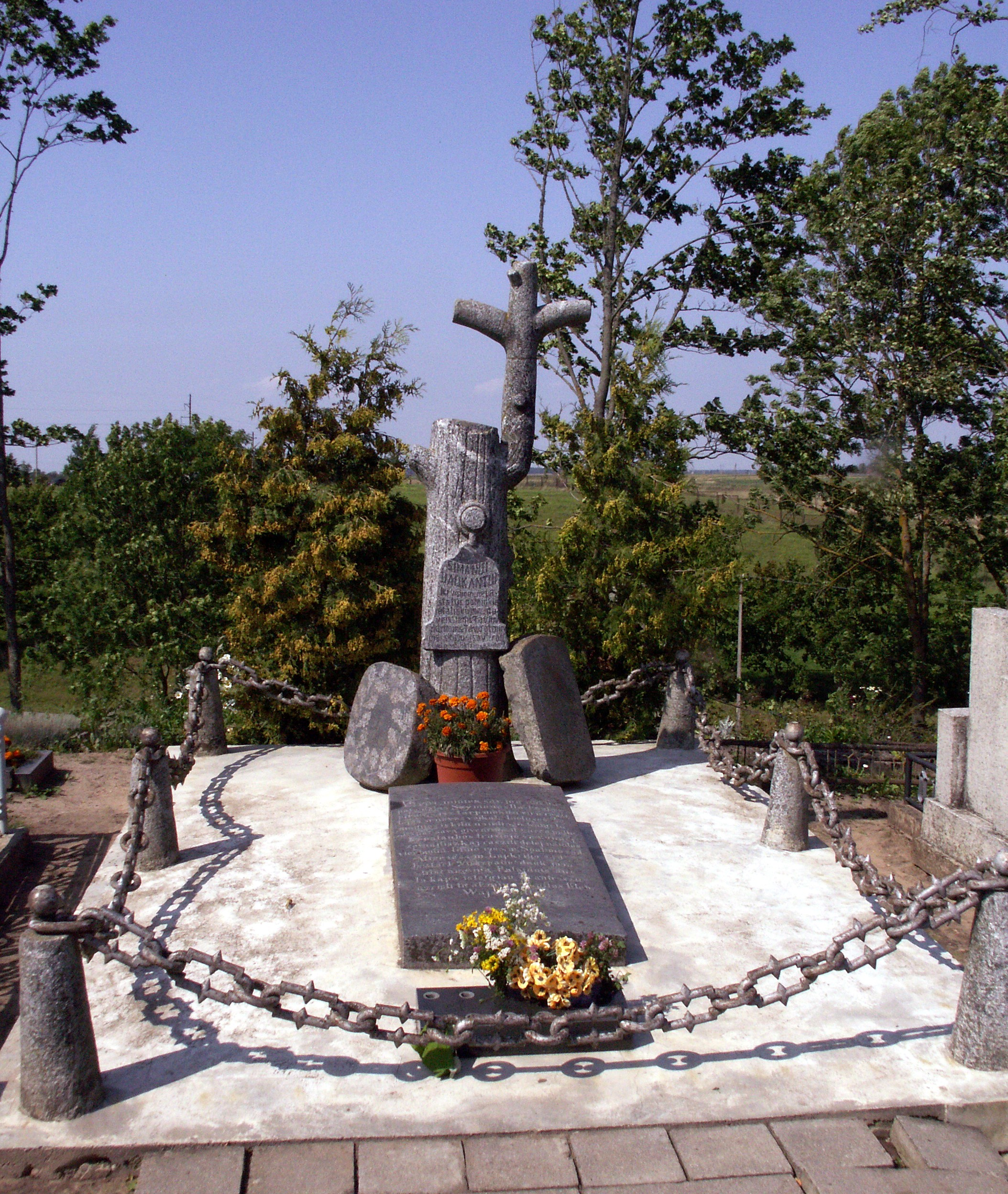
Grave of Daukantas in Papilė

Daukantas moved to Jaunsvirlauka (German: Neu-Bergfried) in present-day Latvia to live with Petras Smuglevičius, a medical doctor and a relative of painter Franciszek Smuglewicz. Smuglevičius was accused of belonging to a secret student society, arrested for a year, later acquitted, but still lived under police supervision. He was very supportive of Lithuanian cultural activities. In early 1858, Mikalojus Akelaitis also moved in to live with Smuglevičius. Akelaitis treated Daukantas as a fatherly figure and they supported each other's work. Daukantas continued to work on his historical studies, writing to linguist Friedrich Kurschat in hopes of obtaining books by Ludwig Rhesa and Daniel Klein and copies of historical sources from Johannes Voigt. He compiled a collection of historical documents, privileges from 1387–1561 that he had inherited from Jerzy Konstanty Plater, and made one last attempt to collect the document he loaned to Teodor Narbutt. Daukantas supported the establishment of the Museum of Antiquities in Vilnius and corresponded with Eustachy Tyszkiewicz hoping to transfer some of his collected historical documents to the museum. Akelaitis, Valančius, and Daukantas wanted to establish Pakeleivingas, a Lithuanian-language periodical aimed at the ordinary village people, but could not get government's permission. Daukantas had four manuscripts ready to be published (two booklets with agricultural advice, Lithuanian reworking of Robinson Crusoe, and a second edition of a Lithuanian primer), but they all remained unpublished due to lack of funds.

Around summer 1859, Daukantas left Jaunsvirlauka and briefly lived with various friends and relatives. In October 1861, he moved to Papilė to live with Ignotas Vaišvila, a parish priest. His health continued to deteriorate. Daukantas and Valančius exchanged final bitter letters in 1861, completely severing their friendship. One of these letters was later published in Aušra. It is unclear what Daukantas did during the January Uprising of 1863–1864, but several of his friends were arrested, imprisoned, or exiled to Siberia. Vaišvila was arrested, but released. Daukantas died on 6 December 1864 and was buried on the summit of the Papilė hill fort without much ceremony. Vaišvila put a simple engraved stone on the grave; twenty years later, he replaced it with an engraved ledger gravestone commissioned in Riga which survives to this day. In 1925, Antanas Raudonis, a former Lithuanian book smuggler and an amateur sculptor, added a cross that is shaped as an oak stump with a growing shoot.

== Works ==
=== Historical studies ===
==== Publication history ====
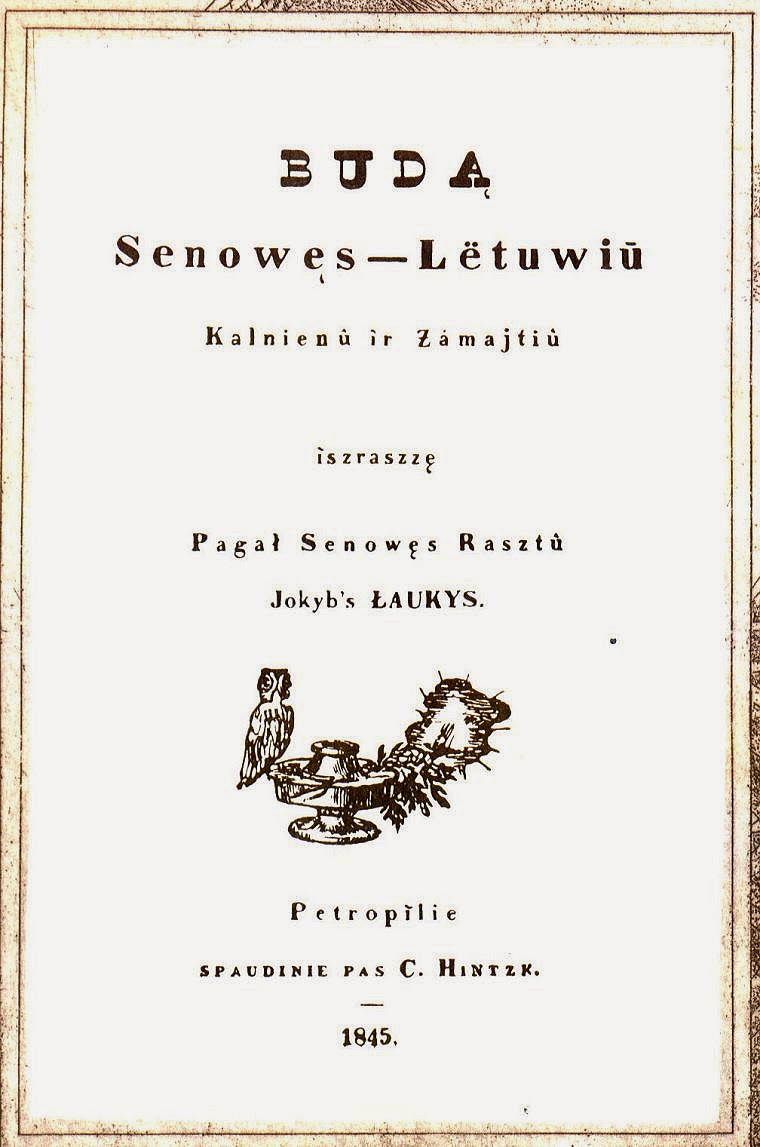
Title page of The Character of the Ancient Lithuanians, Highlanders, and Samogitians published in 1845

Daukantas wrote four original books on the history of Lithuania. Only one of them was published during his lifetime. In his research, Daukantas was hindered by inaccessibility of sources, lack of funds, absent institutional support (i.e. no government institution or university to assist him). It was a lonely, costly, and frustrating undertaking. Book publishing was an expensive undertaking. For example, Daukantas had to pay 2,000 silver rubles to the publisher of his 120-page Latin grammar. The only person known to have provided financial assistance to Daukantas is Ksaveras Kanapackis, who is listed as sponsor of ten books by Daukantas.

He wrote his first historical work, Darbai senųjų lietuvių ir žemaičių (Deeds of the Ancient Lithuanians and Samogitians), in 1822 while still a student at Vilnius University. The work starts with the 7th century BC and ends with the death of King Jogaila (Władysław II Jagiełło) in 1434. The work was discovered in 1919 and first published in 1929. The work was dedicated not to historians or learned men, but to Lithuanian mothers who taught their children and told them deeds of their ancestors. Thus he recognized and acknowledged women's role in educating the younger generation.

His second and largest historical work, Istorija žemaitiška (Samogitian History), was completed by 1834. The manuscript had 1,106 pages. It appears that Daukantas hoped to publish it around 1848 as he ordered a clean copy, which was discovered in 1983. The work ended with the death of Sigismund II Augustus in 1572. Istorija žemaitiška under the title Lietuvos istorija (History of Lithuania) was published in two volumes in 1893 and 1897 in the United States. In 1850, Daukantas reworked it as Pasakojimas apie veikalus lietuvių tautos senovėje (Story of the Deeds of the Ancient Lithuanians) which ended with the death of Grand Duke Vytautas in 1430. He hoped to publish it with the help of Motiejus Valančius and two copies with various corrections were produced. In 1882, Jonas Šliūpas made another copy with hopes of publishing it, but the first 96 pages up to year 1201 were printed by Jonas Kriaučiūnas at the press of Martynas Jankus in 1893 and the work was first published in full only in 1976. It was the only manuscript that Daukantas signed in his real name (though he also used pen name Jonas Einoras).

His third historical book was Būdas senovės lietuvių, kalnėnų ir žemaičių (The Character of the Ancient Lithuanians, Highlanders, and Samogitians). He created the word kalnėnai (highlanders) to refer to Aukštaitija. Russian censors considered the manuscript in May 1844, but due to difficulties finding censors who knew Lithuanian, the work approved only in March 1845. The book was published in Saint Petersburg in February 1846. It was republished in the United States in 1892 and in Lithuania in 1935. It was the first history of the culture of Lithuania. Excerpts were translated to Polish in Rocznik Literacki in 1850 and to German in Mitteilungen der Litauischen literarischen Gesellschaft in 1885. The content was arranged not chronologically as in other works but thematically with chapters covering subjects such as religion, customs, commerce, geography. The short chapter on numismatics, which discussed the Lithuanian long currency and earliest coins of the Grand Duchy, retained its scientific relevance until the 1930s. The book described material and spiritual life of Lithuanians in poetic, literary language. Excerpts of this work are often included in reading materials for Lithuanian literature lessons in Lithuanian schools.

==== Content ====
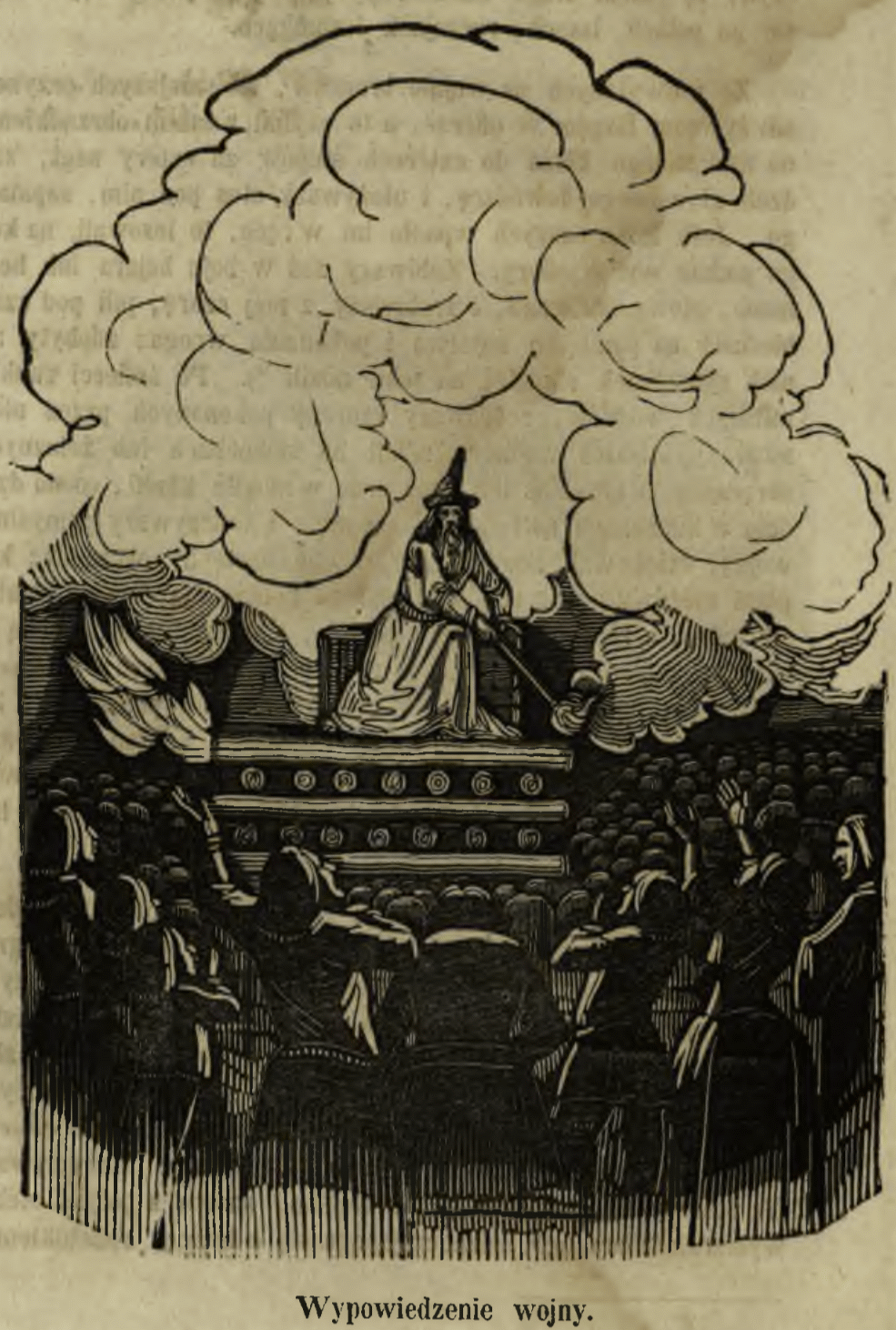
Illustration of a declaration of war by Wincenty Smokowski, published with an 1849 Polish translation of The Character of the Ancient Lithuanians, Highlanders, and Samogitians

Daukantas was one of the first to clearly distinguish a nation from a state. He believed that a nation is defined by its language and customs, not statehood. His histories were not about a territory that no longer existed (and that was mourned by Adam Mickiewicz), but about the living nation. As long as Lithuanian language and customs (folklore, songs, tales, proverbs) existed, the Lithuanian nation would also survive. Daukanatas proposed than developing culture and pursuing education, not just military or political means, were forms of resistance. Therefore, he associated the Lithuanian national identity not with the former Grand Duchy of Lithuania, but with the Lithuanian language, folk culture, and customs – an idea that was further pursued by the Lithuanian National Revival and led to the formation of the independent Lithuania in 1918. He further held liberal ideas that people were born with inalienable rights and that there was a social contract between a nation and the state. He thought that peasants and other commoners were the core of a nation thus going against the Polish trend to emphasize the nation of nobles.

His primary goal was to inspire love of the homeland and Lithuanian national pride among the common folk. He used poetic and lively descriptions, rhetorical elements, monologues and dialogues, and emotional language that brought his history works closer to a literary work. Particularly artistic are wild forest and battle scenes. Daukantas painted an idealized image of ancient Lithuanians who embodied stoic values and lived peacefully in their vast forests until the nobility adopted foreign customs, became lazy, and started exploiting the common folk. This depiction echoed ideas of Jean-Jacques Rousseau and Johann Gottfried Herder that the savage, unspoiled by the civilization, was inherently noble and good. He depicted Grand Duke Vytautas as the great Lithuanian hero while King Jogaila, who initiated the Polish–Lithuanian union in 1385, was a symbol of all ills and evils that later befell Lithuania. He blamed Poland and Polish nobility for Lithuania losing its statehood, moral enslavement of Lithuanians, and falsification and distortions of Lithuania's history. Poland brought economic decline and moral decay to Lithuania – the opposite of the common Polish claim that they "civilized" the pagan barbarians. Such strong anti-Polish sentiment was a radical and daring development among Lithuanians at the time when Polish intellectuals considered the Polish–Lithuanian union to be sacred, but it paved the way for separating the dual Polish-Lithuanian identity into the modern Polish and Lithuanian national identities. Daukantas identified language as the determining factor of nationality. After the publication of Aušra in 1883, such anti-Polish attitudes became increasingly common among Lithuanian activists.

Daukantas idealized and idolized the past. Virgil Krapauskas asserted that Daukantas' letters to Narbutt showed Daukantas to be a better scholar than his works – in the letters Daukantas emphasized the need for better methods of collecting, publishing and analyzing primary sources, though his works remained highly romantic and didactic. Daukantas spent considerable effort in tracking down various historical documents, but he believed that where historical records are missing, historians should use their imagination to fill in the gaps. If a source was favorable to Lithuania, he did not evaluate it critically and readily accepted a number of legends. For example, he elaborated on the theory that Lithuanians were descendants of Herules that he took from Albert Wijuk Kojałowicz (though he rejected the legend about Roman Palemonids), praised ancient democracy of Prussian king Widewuto, and used a loose translation of the short story Żiwila by Adam Mickiewicz. But he was critical of sources that portrayed Lithuania in a negative light. For example, he was one of the first to criticize the Teutonic account of the Battle of Strėva as a crushing defeat of Lithuanian forces or argue that the Lithuanian returned to the Battle of Grunwald and continued to fight. While Daukantas' scholarship was poor and does not stand up to modern standards, it was on par with his contemporaries.

==== Sources cited ====
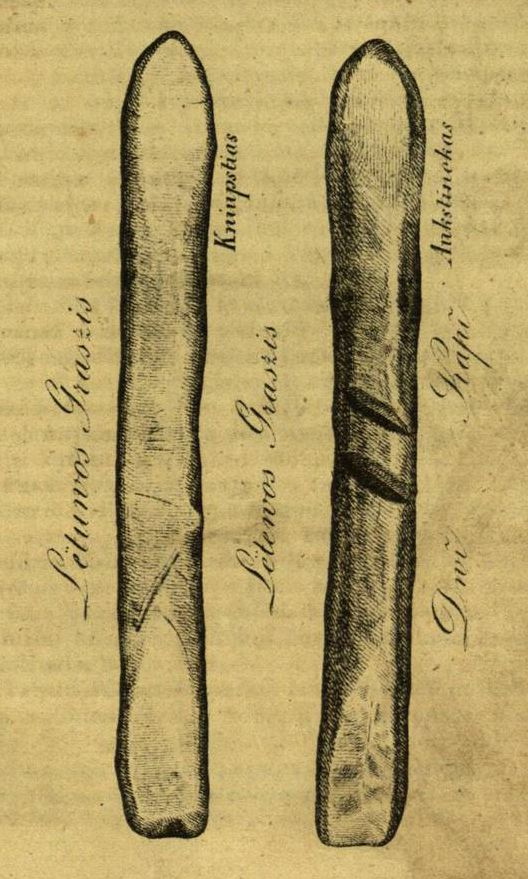
Lithuanian long currency, the only illustration of the 1845 publication of The Character of the Ancient Lithuanians, Highlanders, and Samogitians

Overall, Daukantas' historical works were mostly influenced by the two-volume Historiae Lituanae by Albert Wijuk Kojałowicz (published in 1650 and 1669) from which he borrowed the structure, content, rhetorical and stylistic elements. He also borrowed poetic elements from Kristijonas Donelaitis Daukantas cited his sources erratically and inconsistently. Darbai senųjų lietuvių ir žemaičių had 254 references: 89 to works by August von Kotzebue, 62 to Albert Wijuk Kojałowicz, 29 to Nikolay Karamzin, 15 to Antoni Hlebowicz, and 10 to Teodor Narbutt, in total 31 authors. Istorija žemaitiška cited 320 references; the number of different authors grew to about 70, mostly German historians. There was a shift in references used: von Kotzebue (18 references) fell out of favor and was replaced by Johannes Voigt (75 references) while Hlebowicz was not cited at all. At times, he went beyond citing sources and outright plagiarized works by Kojałowicz, Kotzebue, Voigt. Daukantas also added a number of citations to primary sources, including the Lithuanian Chronicles, Livonian Rhymed Chronicle, chronicles by Wigand of Marburg, Peter von Dusburg, Lucas David. Towards the end of the manuscript, the citations became scarcer and rarer. There were only five references, including two to Jan Łasicki, for 227 pages covering the period from 1440 to 1572.

In Būdas senovės lietuvių, kalnėnų ir žemaičių, Daukantas cited a few documents from the Lithuanian Metrica, but perhaps was afraid to cite it more often as it could have attracted unwanted attention from the Tsarist authorities that he was using his access to the Metrica for non-work related purposes (the Metrica was carefully guarded to avoid any alterations or falsifications). In this work, Daukantas expanded his bibliography by adding references to De moribus tartarorum, lituanorum et moscorum, Livonian Chronicle of Henry, works by Alexander Guagnini and Jan Łasicki, and others. He also used Lithuanian folklore, etymologies, and semantics as a source. While Daukantas cited a wide range of works and authors, including some classical historians such as Tacitus or Ptolemy, he avoided citing Polish historians who supported the union between Poland and Lithuania and considered Lithuania to be just a region of Poland. In particular, he disliked and barely cited Jan Długosz. Overall, Daukantas was an erudite and well-read person, familiar with both classical and new western sources. He knew seven languages: Lithuanian, Russian, Polish, Latin, German, Latvian, and French.

=== Dictionaries ===
In addition to the brief Latin–Lithuanian dictionary published in 1838, Daukantas compiled three other dictionaries, but they were not published. Lithuanians still used the Polish–Latin–Lithuanian dictionary by Konstantinas Sirvydas first published in 1620. Therefore, Daukantas was not the only Lithuanian to start a new Polish–Lithuanian dictionary. Mikalojus Akelaitis, Laurynas Ivinskis, Dionizas Poška, Simonas Stanevičius, Kiprijonas Nezabitauskis, and others are known to have started compiling a dictionary but their works were similarly not published. Daukantas' entries did not provide lexicographic information (for example, gender of nouns) and had very few illustrative examples of how a certain word is used in a sentence. These lexicographic weaknesses reveal Daukantas' tendency to focus solely on words at the price of grammar, syntax, or style. He wanted to demonstrate that Lithuanian language is rich in words and is an equal of other languages, but neglected practical aspects of the dictionaries.

Sometime in 1838–1846, Daukantas worked on a Polish–Lithuanian dictionary that possibly contained about 23,000 words. Only a fragment with 2,244 words has been preserved. The Polish list of words was borrowed from a dictionary published by Jan Litwiński in 1815. Around 1842–1850, he worked on compiling a Lithuanian–Latin dictionary. The unfinished work contains 3,977 words and stops at the word Gwĩldós. Around 1850–1855, Daukantas compiled a three-volume 2,280-page Polish–Lithuanian dictionary. It is unfinished and, according to the count by Jonas Kruopas, contains 56,567 Polish words but only 37,677 Lithuanian equivalents. For the base list of Polish words, Daukantas used the Polish–French dictionary by Stanisław Ropelewski published in 1847. The manuscript of the last dictionary was transferred by Daukantas' relatives to the Lithuanian Scientific Society in 1911. There it was studied by Kazimieras Būga who picked out Lithuanian words, sometimes not known from anywhere else, for his planned Academic Dictionary of Lithuanian. The three volumes of the Polish–Lithuanian dictionary were first published in 1993–1996.

=== Books for students ===
From his own experience, Daukantas understood that Lithuanian students struggled learning Latin because they had to use Polish textbooks and many Lithuanians did not speak Polish before entering school. Therefore, in 1837, he published a 120-page grammar book on Latin. It started with a basic introduction to the Lithuanian grammar on which then Latin grammar rules were built on. Thus, at the same time, it was one of the first textbooks of Lithuanian grammar. In 1838, Daukantas published Epitome historiae sacrae by the French author Charles François Lhomond and added a 42-page Latin–Lithuanian dictionary with about 2,350 Latin words and 250 word combinations and 3,880 Lithuanian words and 260 word combinations. The book was meant as a supplemental Latin reading for school students. It was a popular work that was frequently published with a dictionary. Daukantas did not compile the Latin list of words, but translated it from a Polish edition.

In 1841, Tsarist authorities, looking to weaken the Polish culture, allowed Samogitian Diocese to establish parish schools that could teach Lithuanian language. In 1842, Daukantas published 1,500 copies of Abėcėlė lietuvių, kalnėnų ir žemaičių kalbos (Alphabet of Lithuanian, Highlander, and Samogitian Language). The primer included 18 pages dedicated to Russian language and sample reading material that was not religious. While the book included the traditional prayers and catechism, it also added short moral teachings (e.g. to respect your parents), seven fables, and 298 Lithuanian proverbs. Some of these proverbs were rather crude and vulgar and had to be manually scratched out. However, it was not popular. In a letter to Motiejus Valančius, Daukantas bitterly complained that less than 400 copies were sold in two years. In 1849, Daukantas prepared a second edition of the primer that removed the non-religious texts, but the manuscript remained unclaimed at the censor's office. Another edition was prepared in 1862 which returned the original text except for a few vulgar proverbs, but it could not be published due to the Lithuanian press ban.

Daukantas prepared five other books for school students, but only two were published during his lifetime. He published a translation of fables by Phaedrus (he had them first translated in 1824) and a translation of biographies from De viris illustribus by Cornelius Nepos, both in 1846. He published the fables with hopes of awakening an interest in Lithuanian folk tales. He twice translated and reworked Robinson der Jüngere by Joachim Heinrich Campe (inspired by Robinson Crusoe) – first in 1846 as 397-page Rubinaičio Peliūzės gyvenimas (The Life of Rubinaitis Peliūžė; first published in 1984) and then in 1855 as 495-page Palangos Petris (Petris of Palanga; manuscript lost). He adapted the text by changing names to Lithuanian names, geographic names to locations in Lithuania, aboriginal gods to pagan Lithuanian gods, and borrowing historical details from the Couronian colonization of the Americas, but otherwise remained faithful to Campe's text. He also translated a work by the Roman historian Justin.

=== Other works ===
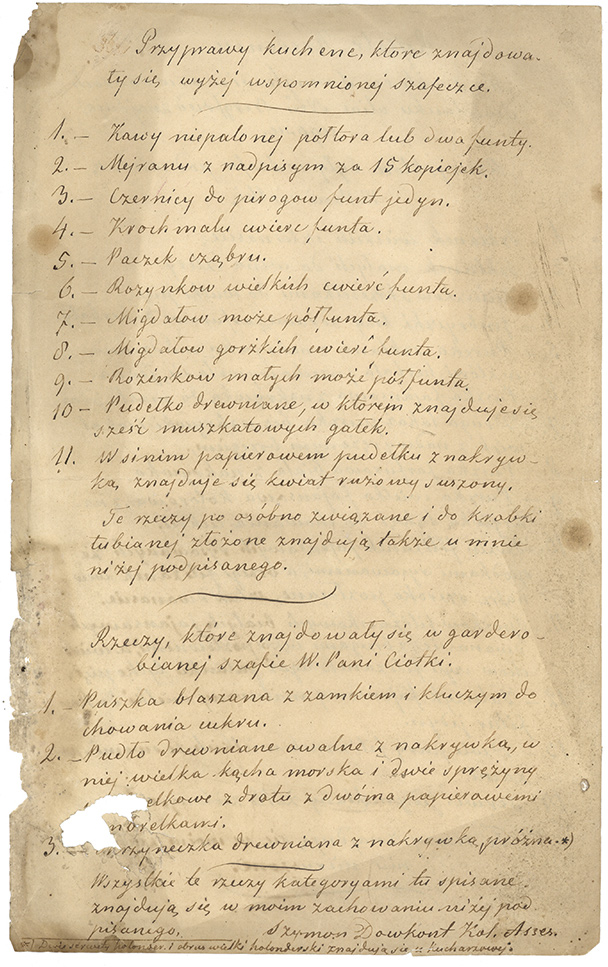
Daukantas' handwriting in Polish from 1857 to 1859

Daukantas was passionate about the Lithuanian language and its purity. He was concerned that religious books, by far the most popular Lithuanian books at the time, were often translated by foreigners with poor knowledge of Lithuanian. As such, prayer book language was full of loanwords and barbarisms from various Slavic languages. Therefore, in 1843, he undertook to prepare a prayer book – a rare feat for a layperson – in correct Lithuanian. He took prayers from various popular books of the time and submitted his manuscript to bishop Szymon Mikołaj Giedroyć. The manuscript received the approval from the diocese only in 1847, but for some unknown reason was not published.

Daukantas was the first to collect examples of all genres (songs, proverbs, fairy-tales, etc.) of Lithuanian folklore. He added Lithuanian proverbs to several of his works, but earlier works used proverbs already published by other authors. In total, he had prepared 932 proverbs for publication. Around 1834–1835, Daukantas started one of the first collections of Lithuanian fairy tales, fables, humorous stories. The handwritten collection was discovered by Jonas Jablonskis and published in full in 1932. Daukantas more frequently collected Lithuanian folk songs – about 850 songs collected by Daukantas are preserved, mostly at the Martynas Mažvydas National Library of Lithuania. In 1846, he published a collection of 118 songs and 190 proverbs. Daukantas edited the songs freely, sometimes merging two songs together. It was a popular book, only a few copies survive in Lithuanian libraries and all of those show heavy use. About 70 of these songs were republished by Georg Heinrich Ferdinand Nesselmann in 1853 and six by August Schleicher in 1857. Daukantas worked perhaps on three more volumes, but they remained unpublished. Since Daukantas spent most of his time outside of Lithuania, he had to rely on local helpers (members of the intelligentsia or students) to visit the common villagers, write down samples of folklore, and send them to Daukantas. This way, the songs were collected by about 40 different people. His collection of folklore was published in two volumes in 1983–1984.

In 1847, Daukantas began translating and publishing booklets with agricultural advice in hopes that Lithuanian peasants could improve their economic conditions via more efficient and profitable farming methods. They were the first practical steps towards the idea that economic development would lead to the development of the national consciousness. He published works on tobacco and on hops in 1847. Next year, he re-published a book on beekeeping – it was already published in Lithuanian in 1801 and 1820. In 1849, Daukantas published three booklets – on fruit trees by Johann Hermann Zigra, on tree seeds, and on fire prevention (it was first published in Lithuanian in 1802). The last book on fodder grasses was published in 1854. Daukantas had two more texts translated from Russian and Polish, but they were not published. Daukantas added original introductions to these texts where he often returned to history. For example, the books about tree seeds and beekeeping talked about the ancient forests of Lithuania.

=== Language and style ===
Daukantas was passionate about the purity of the Lithuanian language. To him it was the primary proof of the language's worth and importance at the time when it was marginalized and pushed out of public life by Polish and Russian. Language's practical use (ease of understanding, clear meaning, convenience) was of little importance. In the early works, Daukantas wrote in the heavy Samogitian dialect (dounininkai sub-dialect) using plentiful diacritics and archaic words, some even borrowed from Latvian or Prussian. Even his contemporaries, including fellow Samogitians Motiejus Valančius and Kajetonas Nezabitauskis, complained that they had difficulty understanding the language. After 1845, when he started publishing popular booklets with agricultural advice, his language became less heavy, more similar to the Aukštaitian dialect. His orthography is extremely varied and inconsistent, even in the same manuscript, as he experimented wanting to eliminate features of Polish and to include features of Prussian Lithuania orthography.

Daukantas had to create numerous neologisms. The three volume Polish–Lithuanian dictionary contained about 3,800 neologisms. As one of the first to write a grammar in Lithuanian, he had to create a number of grammatical terms. Of the many neologism, a few became widely accepted and used in the modern standard Lithuanian, including laikrodis (clock), prekyba (trade), vaistininkas (pharmacist), vietovė (location), būdvardis (adjective), while many other were rejected, including aušrėnai (Balts), laikoskaitlis (chronology), rūdarbis (tailor). He did not consider Latvian to be a foreign language and often borrowed its words, for example asinas from Latvian asins for blood, muižė from Latvian muiža for manor. One of such borrowed words, valstybė for state or polity, became a standard Lithuanian word. Daukantas was an amateur linguist and frequently offered etymologies that were based on similar sounding words instead of the scientific comparative method.

== Legacy ==
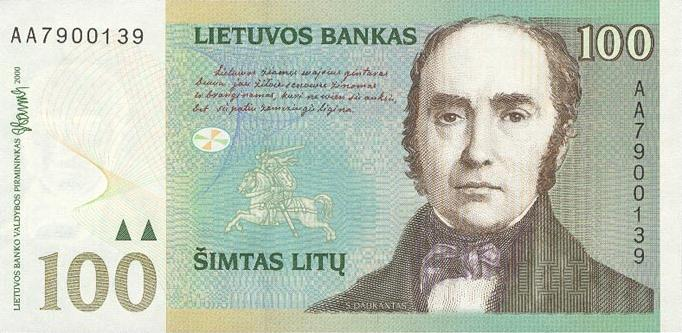
100 litai banknote, released in 2000, featuring Daukantas (obverse) and Vilnius University (reverse)

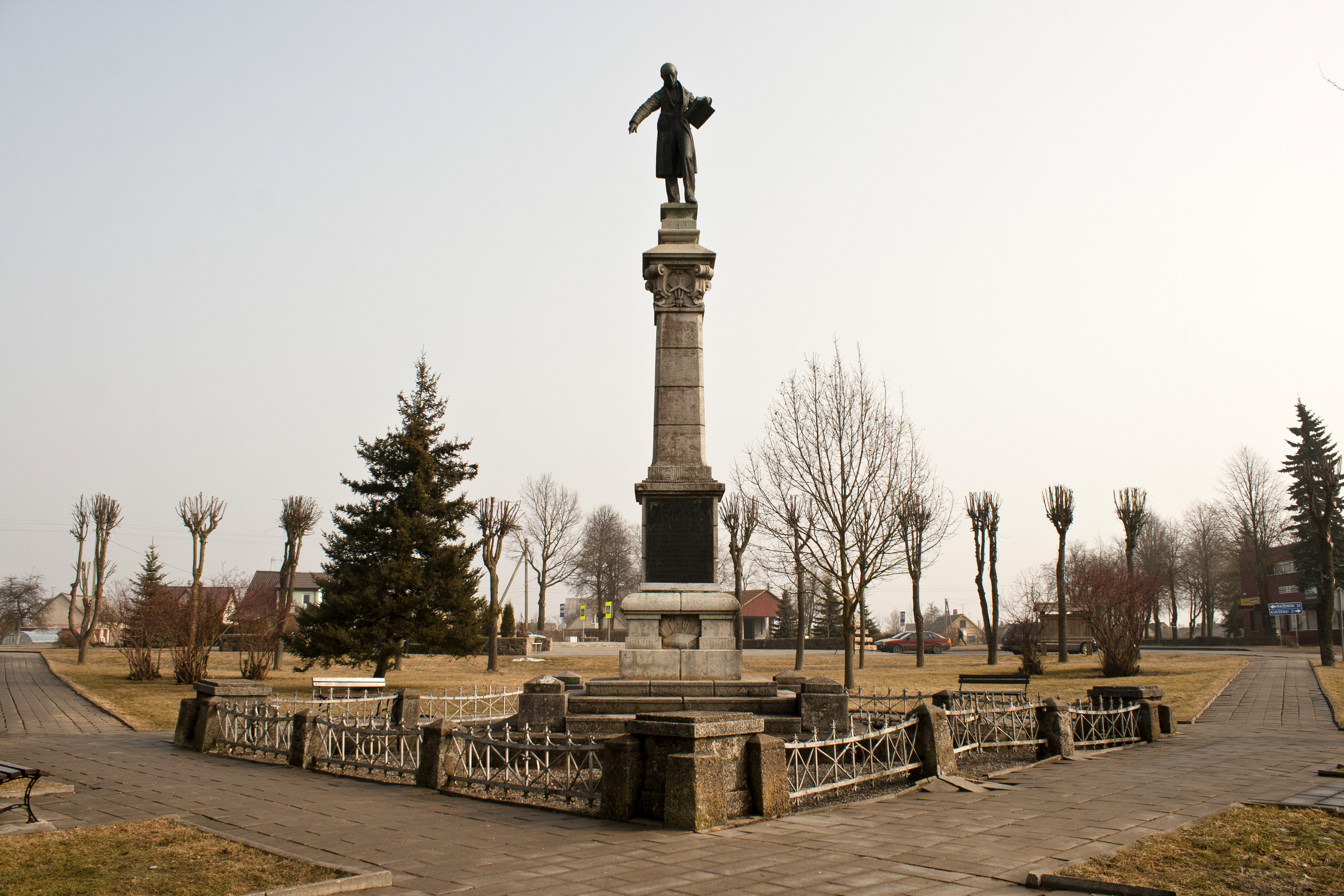
Monument of Daukantas in Papilė erected in 1930

While Daukantas died in obscurity and most of his works unpublished, growing Lithuanian National Revival celebrated his patriotism. Already in the first issue of Aušra, the first Lithuanian-language newspaper, Jonas Šliūpas started publishing multi-part biography of Daukantas and raised the idea of publishing his works. Two historical studies by Daukantas were first published in Vienybė lietuvninkų and later in separate books by Lithuanian Americans in the 1890s. Daukantas' life and work were studied by Eduards Volters, who presented a paper to the Imperial Saint Petersburg Academy of Sciences in 1887, Jonas Jablonskis, who published an article in Varpas in 1893, and by Mečislovas Davainis-Silvestraitis, who published a collection of documents about Daukantas in the United States in 1898. In 1893, Lithuanian newspapers commemorated the 100th birth anniversary. On that occasion, Davainis-Silvestraitis brought a painter to talk to people who knew Daukantas while he was alive and create his portrait. The resulting portrait, though of low artistic quality, was published in United States in an album compiled by Antanas Milukas.

In 1901, Juozas Tumas-Vaižgantas discovered the only known contemporary portrait, painted around 1850. Based on this portrait, Petras Rimša created a plaster relief in 1905. In 1910, Daukantas' relatives transferred his manuscripts and library to the Lithuanian Scientific Society which promoted further study of his life and work. Historian Augustinas Janulaitis published an extensive biography of Daukantas in 1913 and his surviving correspondence in 1922. Daukantas works were added to the Lithuanian school curriculum of Lithuanian literature. In 1924, Lithuanian teachers began raising funds for a monument to Daukantas. A bronze sculpture was designed by Vincas Grybas and erected in Papilė in 1930. Since that time, Daukantas life and works were subjects of numerous academic studies. Two volumes of his selected works were published in 1955 followed by reprints or first publications of his other works. His biography was published as separate monographs by Vytautas Merkys (1972, second edition 1991) and Saulius Žukas (1988).

In 1927, a bronze bust by sculptor Juozas Zikaras was erected in the garden of the Vytautas the Great War Museum in Kaunas (the bust was destroyed by Soviet authorities and restored in 1988). In 1983, Akmenė District Municipality turned the former clergy house in Papilė where Daukantas spent his last years into a memorial museum. From 1993 to the introduction of the euro in 2015, Daukantas was featured on 100 litas banknotes. A monument by sculptor Regimantas Midvikis in his native Lenkimai was unveiled in 1993. The Simonas Daukantas Award was established in 1989 for accomplishments in historical studies, literary work, or other cultural work. Awarded every two years, it is administered by the Skuodas District Municipality since 2003. Its past recipients included historians Vytautas Merkys, Alfredas Bumblauskas, Edvardas Gudavičius, linguist Giedrius Subačius. His place in Lithuanian history is also commemorated by Daukantas Square, facing the Presidential Palace in Vilnius. Seimas (Lithuanian parliament) declared 2018 as the year of Daukantas.

== Works published by Daukantas ==
Original title	Modern Lithuanian spelling	Translated title	Pen name	Year	Description
Prasmą łotinû kałbos	Prasma lotynų kalbos	Primer of the Latin Language	K.W. Myle	1837	Latin grammar for Lithuanian students
Epitome Historiae sacrae		Epitome of Sacred History	(not listed)	1838	Latin work by the French author Charles François Lhomond accompanied by a short Latin–Lithuanian dictionary compiled by Daukantas
Abecieļa lîjtuwiû-kalnienû ir źiamajtiû kałbos	Abėcėlė lietuvių–kalnėnų ir žemaičių kalbos	Alphabet of Lithuanian–Highlander and Samogitian Language	(not listed)	1842	Primer of Lithuanian language
Budą Senowęs Lietuwiû kalneniu ir Żemaitiû	Būdas senovės lietuvių, kalnėnų ir žemaičių	The Character of the Ancient Lithuanians, Highlanders, and Samogitians	Jokyb's Łaukys	1845	The first history of the culture of Lithuania
Dajnes Žiamajtiû	Dainos Žemaičių	Song of Samogitians	(not listed)	1846	Collection of 118 Lithuanian folk songs and 190 proverbs
Pasakas Phedro	Fedro pasakos	Fables of Phaedrus	Motiejus Szauklys	1846	Translation of fables by Phaedrus
Giwatas didiujû karwaidû senowês	Gyvenimas didžiųjų senovės karvedžių	Life of the Great Ancient Warriors	J. Dewinakis	1846	Translation of biographies from De viris illustribus by Cornelius Nepos
Parodimas kajp apinius auginti	Parodymas, kaip apinius auginti	Demonstration How to Grow Hops	Jonas Ragaunis	1847	Agricultural advice translated from a German work by B. A. Grunard; includes 390 Lithuanian proverbs
Pamokimas ape auginimą taboku	Pamokymas apie auginimą tabako	Advice on How to Grow Tobacco	Jonas Girdenis	1847	Agricultural advice translated from a Russian work by Dmitry Nikolaevich Strukov
Naudinga bĩttiû knygele	Naudinga bičių knygelė	Useful Beekeeping Booklet	(not listed)	1848	Agricultural advice translated from a German work by Daniel Gottlieb Settegast
Pamoksłą ape sodnus arba dajginus wajsingû mediû	Pamokslas apie sodus arba daigynus vaisingų medžių	Education on Gardens or Fruit Trees	Anton's Žejmys	1849	Agricultural advice translated from a German work by Johann Hermann Zigra
Pamôkimą kajp rinkti medĩnès siekłàs	Pamokymas, kaip rinkti medžių sėklas	Advice on How to Collect Tree Seeds	Jonas Purwys	1849	Agricultural advice translated from Russian (unknown author)
Ugnęs-kningélę	Ugnies knygelė	Fire Book	Antonas Wajnejkis	1849	Advice on fire prevention translated from German
Siejamoses paszaro-źoles	Sėjamos pašaro žolės	Planting of Fodder Grass	Jonas Warnas	1854	Agricultural advice on fodder grass

== Bibliography ==
- Aleksandravičius, Egidijus (1993). "Simono Daukanto knygų leidėjas Ksaveras Kanapackis" (PDF). Lietuvos atgimimo istorijos studijos (in Lithuanian). 5 (Simonas Daukantas). ISSN 1392-0391.
- Antanaitienė, Dalia (25 May 2010). "Karo muziejaus sodelyje atgimę paminklai". Graži tu mano (in Lithuanian). Bibliotekos pažangai.
- Baar, Monika (2010). Historians and Nationalism: East-Central Europe in the Nineteenth Century. Oxford University Press. ISBN 978-0199581184.
- Bončkutė, Roma (2004). "Simono Daukanto istoriografijos "Pasakojimas apie veikalus lietuvių tautos senovėje" spausdinimo Prūsuose istorija" (PDF). Acta Historica Universitatis Klaipedensis (in Lithuanian). 10. ISSN 1392-4095.
- Bončkutė, Roma (July 2018). "Simono Daukanto asmenybės ir darbų labirintai" (PDF). Gimtoji Kalba (in Lithuanian). 7. ISSN 0868-5134.
- Bončkutė, Roma (2015). "Kristijono Donelaičio "Metų" įtaka Simono Daukanto kalbai". Knygotyra (in Lithuanian). 64: 222–245. doi:10.15388/kn.v64i0.8223. ISSN 2345-0053.
- Brazaitis-Ambrazevičius, Juozas (1980). "Tautinės minties naujinimas: Daukantas lietuvių tautinės sąmonės evoliucijoj" (PDF). In Skrupskelienė, Alina; Grincevičius, Česlovas (eds.). Raštai (in Lithuanian). Vol. I. Į laisvę fondas lietuviškai kultūrai ugdyti. OCLC 9082584.
- ELTA (15 July 2003). "Plečiamas S. Daukanto muziejus Papilėje" (in Lithuanian). Vakarų ekspresas.
- Girininkienė, Vida (5 January 2018). "Romantikai Simonas Daukantas ir Adomas Mickevičius (II)". Literatūra ir menas (in Lithuanian). 1 (3645). ISSN 0233-3260.
- Griškaitė, Reda (2012). "Katarzyna Błachowska, Wiele historii jednego państwa. Obraz dziejów Wielkiego Księstwa Litewskiego do 1569 roku w ujęciu historyków polskich, rosyjskiech, ukraińskich litewskich i białoruskich w XIX wieku". Lietuvos istorijos metraštis (in Lithuanian). 2. doi:10.15463/rec.1189727292. ISSN 0202-3342.
- Ivinskis, Zenonas (November 1964). "Simanas Daukantas ir jo palikimas Lietuvos istorijos srityje". Aidai (in Lithuanian). 9 (174): 385–396. ISSN 0002-208X.
- Jurgutis, Vytautas (1993). "Simono Daukanto "Dainės žemaičių"" (PDF). Lietuvos atgimimo istorijos studijos (in Lithuanian). 5 (Simonas Daukantas). ISSN 1392-0391.
- Kojala, Linas (14 December 2012). "Simonas Daukantas – lietuvių tautos Herodotas" (in Lithuanian). Bernardinai.lt.
- Krapauskas, Virgil (2000). Nationalism and Historiography: The Case of Nineteenth-Century Lithuanian Historicism. New York: Columbia University Press. ISBN 0-88033-457-6.
- Lukšienė, Meilė (2014). Prie tautos kultūros pamatų (PDF) (in Lithuanian). Švietimo aprūpinimo centras. ISBN 978-9986-03-670-8.
- Martišiūtė-Linartienė, Aušra, ed. (2011). Elektroninė literatūros chrestomatija 11 klasei (PDF) (in Lithuanian). Lietuvių literatūros ir tautosakos institutas. ISBN 978-609-425-055-2.
- Meilus, Eimantas (1993). "Apie Daukantų giminę" (PDF). Lietuvos atgimimo istorijos studijos (in Lithuanian). 5 (Simonas Daukantas). ISSN 1392-0391.
- Merkys, Vytauras (1991). Simonas Daukantas (PDF) (in Lithuanian) (2nd ed.). Vilnius: Vyturys. ISBN 5-7900-0405-9.
- Merkys, Vytauras (1999). Motiejus Valančius. Tarp katalikiškojo universalizmo ir tautiškumo (in Lithuanian). Vilnius: Mintis. ISBN 5-417-00812-5.
- Mukienė, Danutė (2010). "Simonas Daukantas" (PDF). Žemaičių žemė (in Lithuanian). 1. ISSN 1392-2610.
- Orgelbrand, Samuel, ed. (1899). "Dowkont Szymon". S. Orgelbranda Encyklopedia Powszechna (in Polish). Vol. IV. Warsaw: S. Orgelbrand i Synowie. OCLC 671598403.
- Petraitienė, Irena (21 January 2018). "Simonas Daukantas ir Motiejus Valančius – tarsi du neatskiriami, nors skirtingi, broliai" (in Lithuanian). Bernardinai.lt.
- Ruzas, Vincas (2004a). "Simonui Daukantui skirti medaliai" (PDF). Papilė. Lietuvos valsčiai (in Lithuanian). Vol. I. Versmė. ISBN 9986-9236-8-9.
- Ruzas, Vincas (2004b). "Simono Daukanto indėlis į lietuvišką numizmatiką" (PDF). Papilė. Lietuvos valsčiai (in Lithuanian). Vol. I. Versmė. ISBN 9986-9236-8-9.
- Sabaliauskas, Algirdas (2008). "Daukantas, Simonas". In Ambrazas, Vytautas; et al. (eds.). Lietuvių kalbos enciklopedija (in Lithuanian) (2nd ed.). Vilnius: Mokslo ir enciklopedijų leidybos institutas. ISBN 978-5-420-01623-7.
- Subačius, Giedrius (1990a). "Simono Daukanto žodynai". Lietuvių atgimimo istorijos studijos (in Lithuanian). 1 (Tautinės savimonės žadintojai: nuo asmens iki partijos). ISSN 1392-0391.
- Subačius, Giedrius (1990b). "S. Daukanto didžiojo lenkų–lietuvių kalbų žodyno istorija". Lietuvos aukštųjų mokyklų mokslo darbai. Kalbotyra (in Lithuanian). 41 (1). ISSN 1648-0430.
- Subačius, Giedrius (1997). "Žemaičių mąstymo apie bendrinę kalbą istorijos metmenys". Metmenys (in Lithuanian). 72. ISSN 0543-615X.
- Subačius, Giedrius (2013). "Svetimieji ir savieji Simono Daukanto kalbos gryninimo strategijoje". Archivum Lithuanicum. 15. ISSN 1392-737X.
- Subačius, Giedrius (2016). "Simono Daukanto Istorijos žemaitiškos (1828–1834) rašybos lūžiai: diakritikai, geminatos, digrafai" (PDF). Archivum Lithuanicum. 18. ISSN 1392-737X.
- Subačius, Giedrius (2018). Simono Daukanto Rygos ortografija (1827–1834) (in Lithuanian). Lietuvos istorijos institutas. ISBN 9786098183436.
- Subačius, Giedrius; Vanags, Pēteris (2016). "Žodis valstybė – Simono Daukanto pasiskolintas latvizmas" (PDF). Archivum Lithuanicum (in Lithuanian). 18. ISSN 1392-737X.
- Suziedelis, Saulius A. (2011). Historical Dictionary of Lithuania (2nd ed.). Scarecrow Press. ISBN 978-0-8108-7536-4.
- Trumpa, Vincas (Spring 1965). "Simonas Daukantas, Historian and Pioneer of Lithuanian National Rebirth". Lituanus. 1 (11). ISSN 0024-5089.
- Zinkevičius, Zigmas (1990). Lietuvių kalbos istorija (in Lithuanian). Vol. IV. Mokslas. ISBN 5-420-00661-8.
