= Lithuanian long currency =

Baltic region commodity money

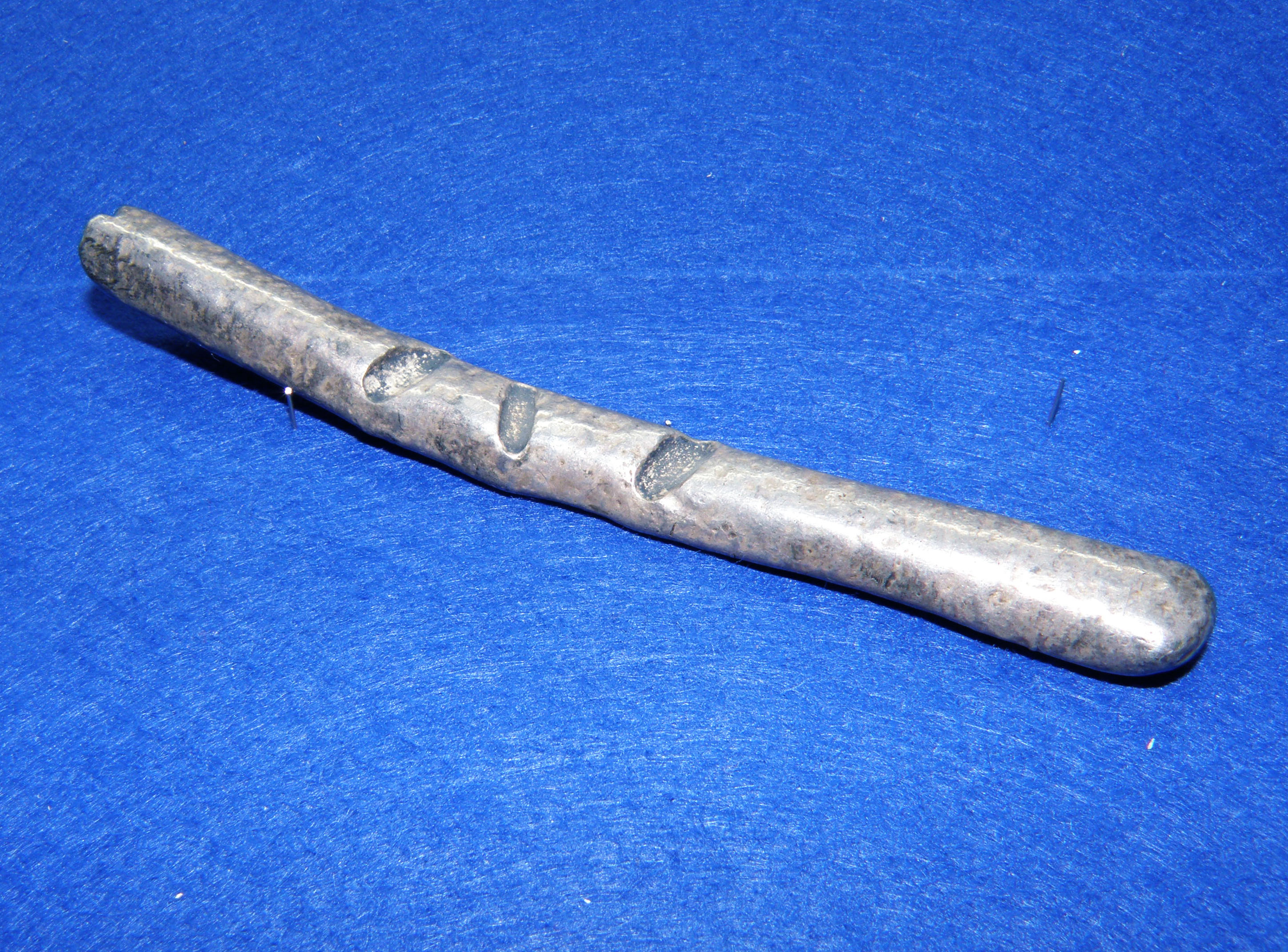
Example of a Lithuanian long with three cut marks

The so-called Lithuanian long currency was a type of money used by the Baltic tribes and in the early Grand Duchy of Lithuania in the 12th–15th centuries. It was commodity money in the form of silver ingots. Most often they were semicircular rods about 13 cm (5.1 in) in length and weighted between 100 and 110 g (3.5 and 3.9 oz). Other trading centers, notably Kievan Rus' and Veliky Novgorod, developed their own version of such ingots which are known as grivna or grzywna. The ingots were replaced by minted coins in the middle of the 15th century.

== Terminology ==
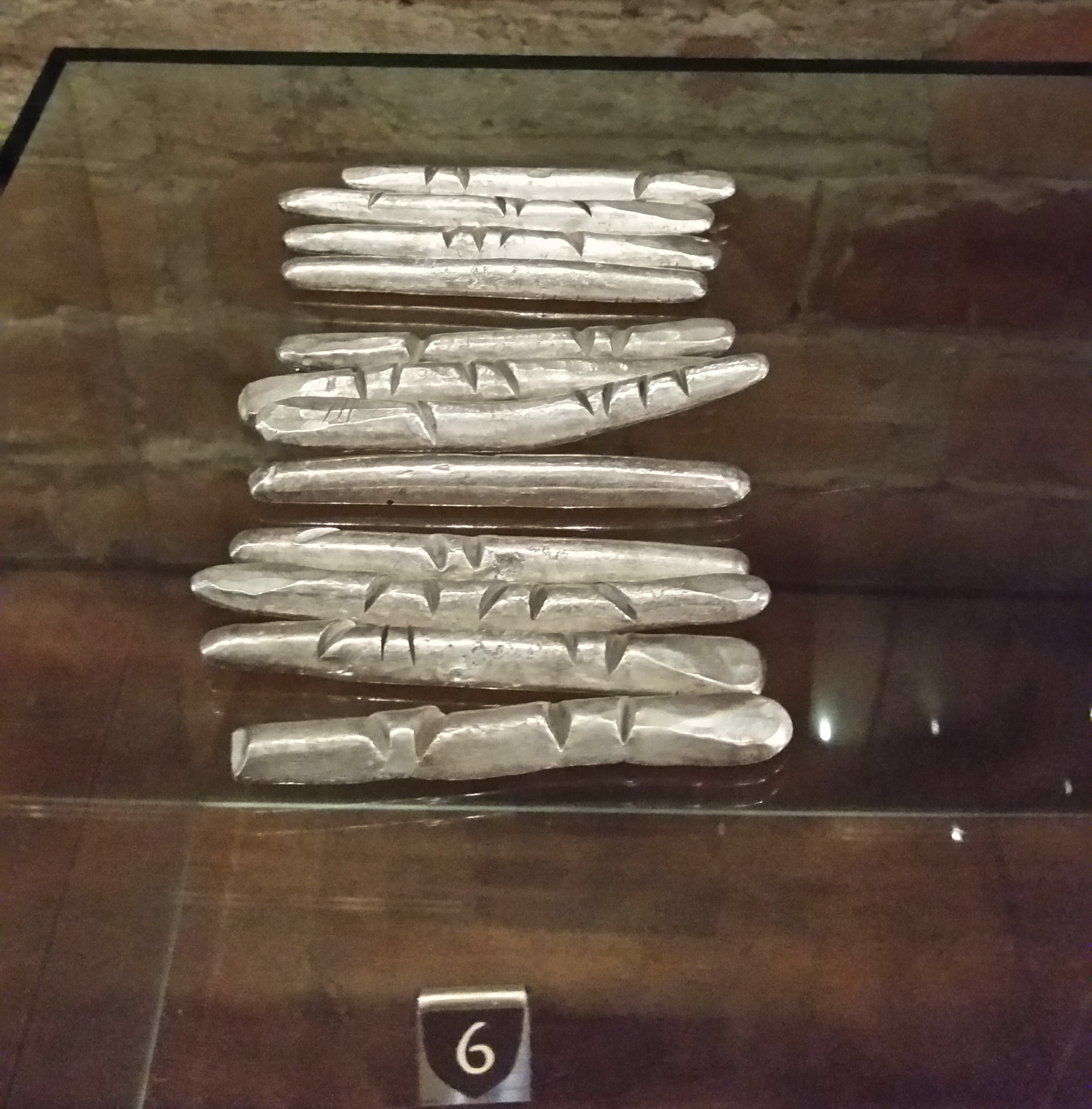
Lithuanian long currency at the Trakai Island Castle Museum

The currency was mentioned already by Tadeusz Czacki (1800) and Simonas Daukantas (1845). In 1932, Povilas Karmaza published an extensive study on a hoard found in Ribiškės. He measured, weighted, and classified about 400 pieces of semicircular cast ingots, but this work was limited to this one hoard. G. Federov (1949) was the first to attempt to create a classification system and topography of the findings to date. This work was still confused and incomplete. In 1981, Zenonas Duksa published a comprehensive study on coins and ingots that circulated before the advent of local coin minting. Though many discoveries were made since then, it remains the standard reference work on the subject.

The currency is known by a great variety of terms and there is no clear consensus among researchers which of them is most appropriate:

- Ilgasis (plural ilgieji): from the Lithuanian word ilgas meaning long.
- Kapa: from kopa, a unit of measurement equal to 60.
- Grivina: from Slavic grzywna
- Rublis: from Slavic ruble. Half ruble is also known as poltina.
- Izroj (Изрой): from inscription found on one of the ingots.

== Forged predecessors ==
A silver-based economy developed in the 9th century. Lacking minted coins, Vikings developed bullion-based trading, using hacksilver and ingots. The earliest silver ingots that were used as currency were forged (kaltiniai lydiniai). They circulated from the 10th to the early 12th centuries and are very rare in Lithuania. As of 1981, forged ingots were found only seven times within the territory of Lithuania. Archaeologist Duksa identified three sub-types: spiral bracelet, ribbon ingot, and band ingot.

Spiral bracelets are made of a thin strip of silver coiling around three to seven times. The items are well made, decorative. Only one example is known from Lithuania (illustration: Duksa (1981), plate XVIII). It is not known when and where the bracelet was found, but it is kept at the National Museum of Lithuania. The coil goes around 4.5 times. It weighs 101.07 grams (3.565 oz) and measures 5.8 centimetres (2.3 in) in diameter. Such items are a lot more common in Gotland, but they are also found in Poland, Germany (Schleswig-Holstein), Finland. They are dated to the 10th century.

Ribbon ingots (žiediniai lydiniai) are made of broader (1–1.2 cm (0.39–0.47 in) in width) rectangular strip of silver. They are either a straight stick or a small spiral tube (illustration: Vaitkunskienė (1981), plate 9). They are roughly made, with clear signs of forging, not decorative. They are more commonly found in Gotland with a few artifacts known from southern Sweden, Poland, and Latvia. They are dated to the 11th century. In Lithuania, they were found in five locations: Gudai, Mažeikiai District (November 1938, seven items reached museum, average weight 114 g (4.0 oz)), Įpiltis, Kretinga District (1927 or earlier, one item weighs 101.65 g (3.586 oz)), Joniškis (1958, five items, approx. weight 102 g (3.6 oz)), Ramygala (1934 or earlier, one item since lost weighted 92 g (3.2 oz)), and Ruseiniai, Kėdainiai District (in 1968–69, one incomplete item weighs 84.35 g (2.975 oz)).

Band ingots (juostiniai lydiniai) are very similar to a bracelet. Only one example is known from Lithuania (illustration: Vaitkunskienė (1981), plate LXXVI): a rectangular strip of silver is decorated from the outside with groves and raised dots. It was found in a goldsmith's grave in Graužiai, Kėdainiai District during an archaeological excavation of a grave field in 1938. It weighs 99.52 g (3.510 oz). Similar items were also found in Old Prussia (Brodzikowo, Kiwity, and Łążyn in present-day Poland) and in Livonia (present-day Latvia). No equivalent items are found elsewhere; therefore, archaeologists believe it was a local Baltic invention. They are dated to the first half of the 12th century.

== Cast currency ==
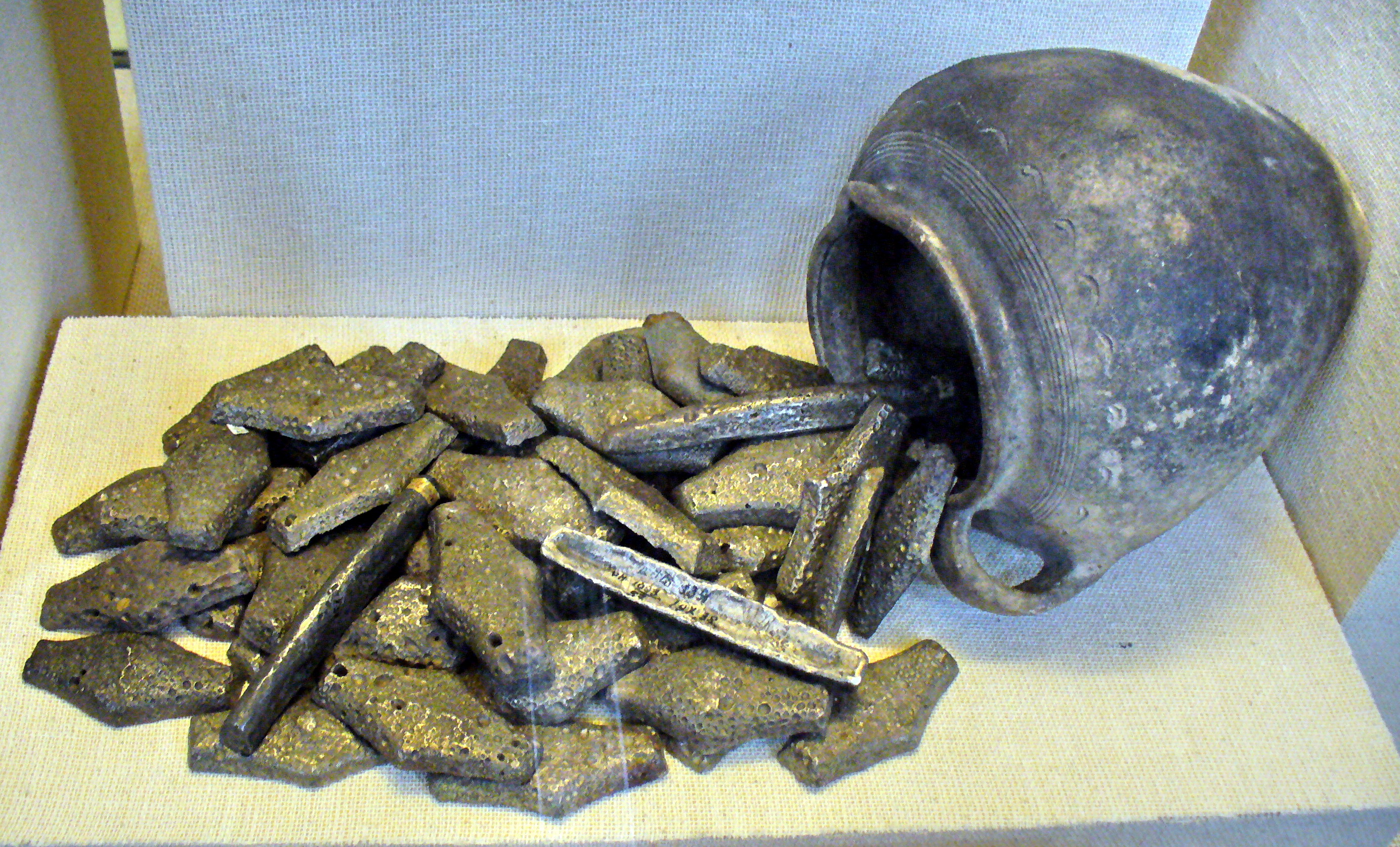
A hoard of hexagonal Kiev and rod-shaped Novgorod grivnas (State Historical Museum in Moscow)

Irregular cast silver ingots circulated from about 11th to early 12th centuries. Only one such example is known from Lithuania, found in 1938 in Graužiai. Around the second half of the 12th century, supply of minted Western European coins dried up and there was no centralized power in Eastern Europe to take up coin mintage. The period is known as "coinless period". However, merchants needed a means of exchange. Therefore, a local system of cast silver ingots was developed. While silver was imported (there are no silver mines in the region; the main mining area was in the Upper Harz in Germany), the ingots were cast locally. At first, a wax model was created. Then it was coated with clay and fired in a furnace inside a clay or sand pit. The wax would melt leaving a mold for the ingot. Molten silver was poured into the mold using a special clay scoop. After cooling off, the mold was broken to remove the ingot. Therefore, most molds were one-time use though a few examples of ingots are known that were cast using the same mold. Because of this technique, archaeologists have not discovered any furnaces or molds, only clay spoons and pouring cups.

=== Semicircular ingots ===
Semicircular cast ingots are by far the most popular. As of 1981, there some 800 items (about 87 kg (192 lb)) found in 40 different locations (22 in Lithuania, 5 in Latvia, 5 in Kaliningrad Oblast, 4 in Belarus, 2 in Russia, 1 in Ukraine, and 1 in Poland). All ingots found in Lithuania were discovered accidentally; only in 1985 the first ingots were found during an archaeological excavation in Kernavė. Since then more discoveries were made. With the invention of metal detectors and subsequent rise of illegal archaeology, new discoveries are made almost annually, but rarely enter academic circles. The largest discovery was made by a farmer plowing his fields in Ribiškės (now within Vilnius) in 1930. Many items were looted by the locals before Povilas Karmaza made an inventory. In total, there were about 530 Lithuanian longs (semicircular cast ingots), 9 Novgorod and 19 Kiev grivnas – with a combined weight of about 60 kg (130 lb).

=== Three-edged ingots ===
Three-edged ingots is a rare and late sub-type of Lithuanian longs. They are found full or cut in half (halves are also known as poltina). As of 1981, they were found in seven locations in a triangle between Kaunas, Vilnius, and Alytus and in Kretinga. In total, 38 ingots were found – 5 full and 33 cut in half. In 2002, half of a three-edged ingot was found in the Lower Castle of Vilnius. In 2010, 52 full and 4 half ingots were found in Grigaičiai near Naujoji Vilnia. In 2004 and 2007, the Money Museum of the Bank of Lithuania acquired two halves of three-edged ingots (circumstances of their discovery are not known). One of them is particularly interesting as it is countermarked with what appears to be a crown inside a circular rope border. In 2002 and 2003, the first three-edged ingots were found outside of Lithuania: 9 halves in Palačany (Палачаны) and 10 halves plus 1 full bar in Litva (Літва) villages in Maladzyechna Raion, Belarus.

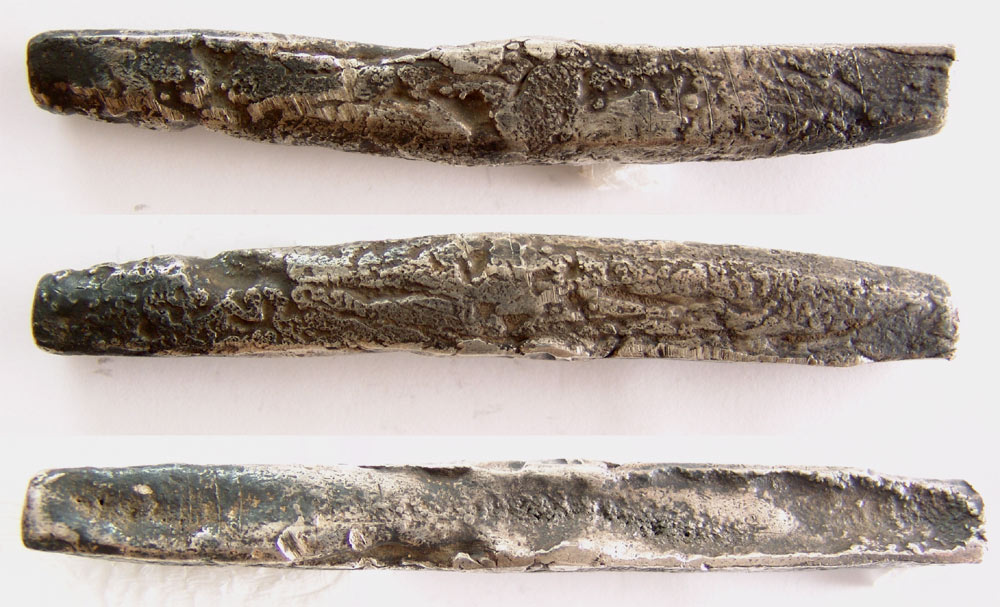
Three-edged Novgorod grivnas share many similarities with Lithuanian three-edged longs.

The three-edged ingots are most often found together with earliest coins minted in the Grand Duchy of Lithuania and with Prague groschens – coins that circulated in the late 14th and early 15th centuries. Chemical analysis of three such ingots revealed that they were of very high quality (silver content between 97.4% and 98.9% with traces of gold and copper). The Money Museum analyzed the two halves in its possession and found 91.5% and 97.7% silver content. A 2010 analysis of a half ingot kept in a local museum in Kernavė revealed silver content of 97.05–97.11%. Researchers proposed that three-edged ingots appeared as a result of a monetary reform in response to the declining quality of semicircular ingots. Also, it is likely that the weight was adjusted to match Prague groschens: 50 groschens weighed about 189 g (6.7 oz).

The three-edged ingots share many similarities with Novgorod three-edged grivnas, but archaeologist Duksa identified three main differences:

1. Weight: Lithuanian triangular ingots are lighter (170.94–185.72 g (6.030–6.551 oz)) than Novgorod counterparts (approx. 190–200 g (6.7–7.1 oz))
2. Shape: Lithuanian ingots are thicker (1.8–2.1 cm (0.71–0.83 in) in height) than Novgorod counterparts (1.2–1.7 cm (0.47–0.67 in))
3. Markings: Lithuanian ingots lack cuts, stamps, writing, or other markings
