= Ahron Dovid Burack =

Lithuanian rabbi (1892–1960)

Ahron Dovid Burack (also known as Aaron David or Ahron David; Hebrew: אהרן דוד בוראק; 16 May 1892 – 7 October 1960) was a Lithuanian-American rabbi and rosh yeshivah.

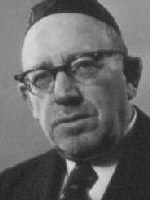
Rabbi Aaron David Burack

== Early life and education ==
Ahron Dovid Burack was born in Popelan (now Papile) in Kovno Governorate, Lithuania, on 16 May 1892 to Chaim Natan Burack and Basse Gittel Gibberman. As a young man in Lithuania, he studied at Yeshivas Knesses Yisrael (Slabodka) near Kaunas and at the Telshe Yeshiva near Telšiai, where he was ordained by Rabbi Yosef Leib Bloch.

== Rabbinical Positions ==
Burack immigrated to the United States in 1913. Following his arrival, Ahron Dovid Burack became rabbi of Beit Hamedrish Etz Chaim Anshei Volozhin in New York City.

In 1917, the Orthodox Jewish synagogue Ohel Moshe Chevra Tehilim in Brooklyn, New York, granted Burack a lifetime contract to serve as rabbi of the congregation.

Burack was an outspoken advocate for Jewish communal and Zionist causes. He was a leader of the Union of Orthodox Rabbis of the United States and Canada and the Religious Zionists of America (Hapoel Hamizrachi), and was also involved with the United Jewish Appeal, the Jewish National Fund and the Hebrew Immigrant Aid Society (HIAS). He was among a group of rabbis who implored President Franklin Delano Roosevelt and the United States Congress to help rescue European Jews during World War II, reading a petition as part of a demonstration on the steps of the United States Capitol Building.

== Teaching and Writing ==
Burack was appointed Rosh Yeshiva at the Rabbi Isaac Elchanan Theological Seminary in 1919 and continued to serve until his death in 1960. He was also a professor of Talmud and Homiletics at Yeshiva University.

He was the author of פרחי אהרון Pirchei Aharon (Flowers of Aaron), two volumes of "homiletics and halacha" published in 1954.

== Yeshivat Pirchei Aharon ==
Burack died in New York on October 7, 1960, during the Sukkot holiday, and was later buried in the Sanhedria Cemetery in Jerusalem. Following his death in 1960, a secondary school in Kiryat Shmuel, Haifa, Israel, was named Yeshivat Pirchei Aharon in tribute to Rabbi Ahron Dovid Burack's memory and his work. The school, which provides both secular and Torah education, is affiliated with the Bnei Akiva movement. Notable alumni of Yeshivat Pirchei Aharon include Israel's former Ashkenazi Chief Rabbi Yona Metzger and past mayors of the cities of Jerusalem (Uri Lupolianski) and Akko (Acre) (Shimon Lankry).
