= Vytautas Merkys =

Lithuanian historian (1929–2012)

- Born: 5 May 1929; Čivai, near Kupiškis, Lithuania
- Died: 25 July 2012 (aged 83); Vilnius, Lithuania
- Education: Vilnius University (1951)
- Occupations: Historian, Professor
- Employer(s): Vilnius University, Vytautas Magnus University
- Known for: Lithuanian 19th- and early 20th-century history, Lithuanian book smuggling, Lithuanian national revival
- Awards: Order of the Lithuanian Grand Duke Gediminas (Third Class, 1995); Lithuanian science award (1997)

Vytautas Merkys (5 May 1929 – 25 July 2012) was a Lithuanian historian and a professor at Vilnius University.

== Biography ==
Vytautas Merkys graduated from Vilnius University's department of history and philology in 1951. In 1952 he began working at the Lithuanian SSR Institute of History, but for ideological reasons he was soon fired, along with Mečislovas Jučas. He returned to the Institute in 1953 as a fellow.

He initiated his candidacy for a doctorate of philosophy degree in 1957 with the thesis Revoliucinis Vilniaus miesto darbininkų judėjimas 1895–1904 m. (The Revolutionary Movement of Vilnius City Workers from 1895 to 1904), and in 1969 he was awarded a doctorate (the Soviet equivalent of habilitation) for his dissertation Lietuvos pramonės augimas ir proletariato formavimasis XIX amžiuje (The Growth of Lithuanian Industry and the Formation of the Proletariat in the 19th Century).

The grave of Vytautas Merkys at the Antakalnis cemetery

In 1986 he left the Institute and was designated head of the Department of Economic History at the Lithuanian SSR Academy of Sciences. He returned to the Institute of History in 1987 and became its director. Between 1992 and 2000 he was a senior fellow there. Vytautas Merkys has been a professor at Vilnius University since 1991, and was a professor at Vytautas Magnus University from 1993 to 2000. In 1990 he was elected to the Lithuanian Academy of Sciences, and since 2001 he has been a member of the Lithuanian Catholic Academy of Sciences.

Vytautas Merkys received the Lithuanian presidential award, Order of the Lithuanian Grand Duke Gediminas, third class, in 1995.

== Awards and recognition ==
- Order of the Lithuanian Grand Duke Gediminas, Third Class, 1995
- Lithuanian science award, 1997, for fundamental work on the Lithuanian book smuggling movement between 1864-1904

== Important works ==
Vytautas Merkys' principal works focus on Lithuanian 19th-century and early 20th century history, especially the Lithuanian national revival, the Lithuanian book smuggling movement during the ban on the Lithuanian press, the work of the 19th-century historian Simonas Daukantas, and the life of the 19th-century bishop Motiejus Valančius.

- V. Merkys, Vilniaus darbininkų revoliucinis judėjimas 1905–1907 m. išvakarėse, Vilnius, 1957.V. Merkys, Lietuvos valstiečių ir žemės ūkio darbininkų judėjimas 1901–1904 m., Vilnius, 1959.
- V. Merkys, Liudvikas Janavičius, Vilnius: Vaga, 1964.
- V. Merkys, Narodnikai ir pirmieji marksistai Lietuvoje, Vilnius: Mintis, 1967.
- V. Merkys, Dalevskių šeima, Vilnius: Vaga, 1967.
- J. Jurginis, V. Merkys, A. Tautavičius, Vilniaus miesto istorija nuo seniausių laikų iki Spalio revoliucijos, Vilnius: Mintis, 1968, (Lietuvos SSR valstybinė premija, 1969).
- В. Меркис, Развитие промышленности и формирование пролетариата в Литве в XIX в., Вильнюс: Минтис, 1969.
- M. Valančius, Raštai, t. 2: Žemaičių vyskupystė, parengė V. Merkys, Vilnius, 1972.
- S. Daukantas, Raštai, t. 1–2, sudarė V. Merkys, Vilnius, 1976.
- V. Merkys, Nelegalioji lietuvių spauda kapitalizmo laikotarpiu (ligi 1904 m.). Politinės jos susikūrimo aplinkybės, Vilnius: Mokslas, 1978.
- V. Merkys, Lietuvos valstiečiai ir spauda XIX a. pabaigoje – XX a. pradžioje, Vilnius, 1982.
- Lietuvos TSR istorija, t. 1 Nuo seniausių laikų iki 1917 metų, red. kol. B. Vaitkevičius, M. Jučas, V. Merkys, Vilnius: Mokslas, 1985.
- V. Merkys, L. Mulevičius, R. Vėbra, E. Vidmantas, Lietuvių nacionalinio išsivadavimo judėjimas /ligi 1904 m./, Vilnius: Mokslas, 1987.
- M. Jučas, I. Lukšaitė, V. Merkys, Lietuvos istorija: Nuo seniausių laikų iki 1917 metų, Vilnius: Mokslas, 1988.
- V. Merkys, Simonas Daukantas, 2 papild. leid., Vilnius: Vyturys, 1991.
- V. Merkys, Knygnešių laikai. 1864–1904, Vilnius: Valstybinis leidybos centras, 1994.
- V. Merkys, Draudžiamosios lietuviškos spaudos kelias. 1864–1904: Informacinė knyga, Vilnius: Mokslo ir enciklopedijų leidykla, 1994.
- V. Merkys, Motiejus Valančius: tarp katalikiškojo universalizmo ir tautiškumo, Vilnius: Mintis, 1999.
- V. Merkys, Tautiniai santykiai Vilniaus vyskupijoje 1798–1918 m.: Vilnius: Versus Aureus, 2006.
