= Lenkimai =

- Town
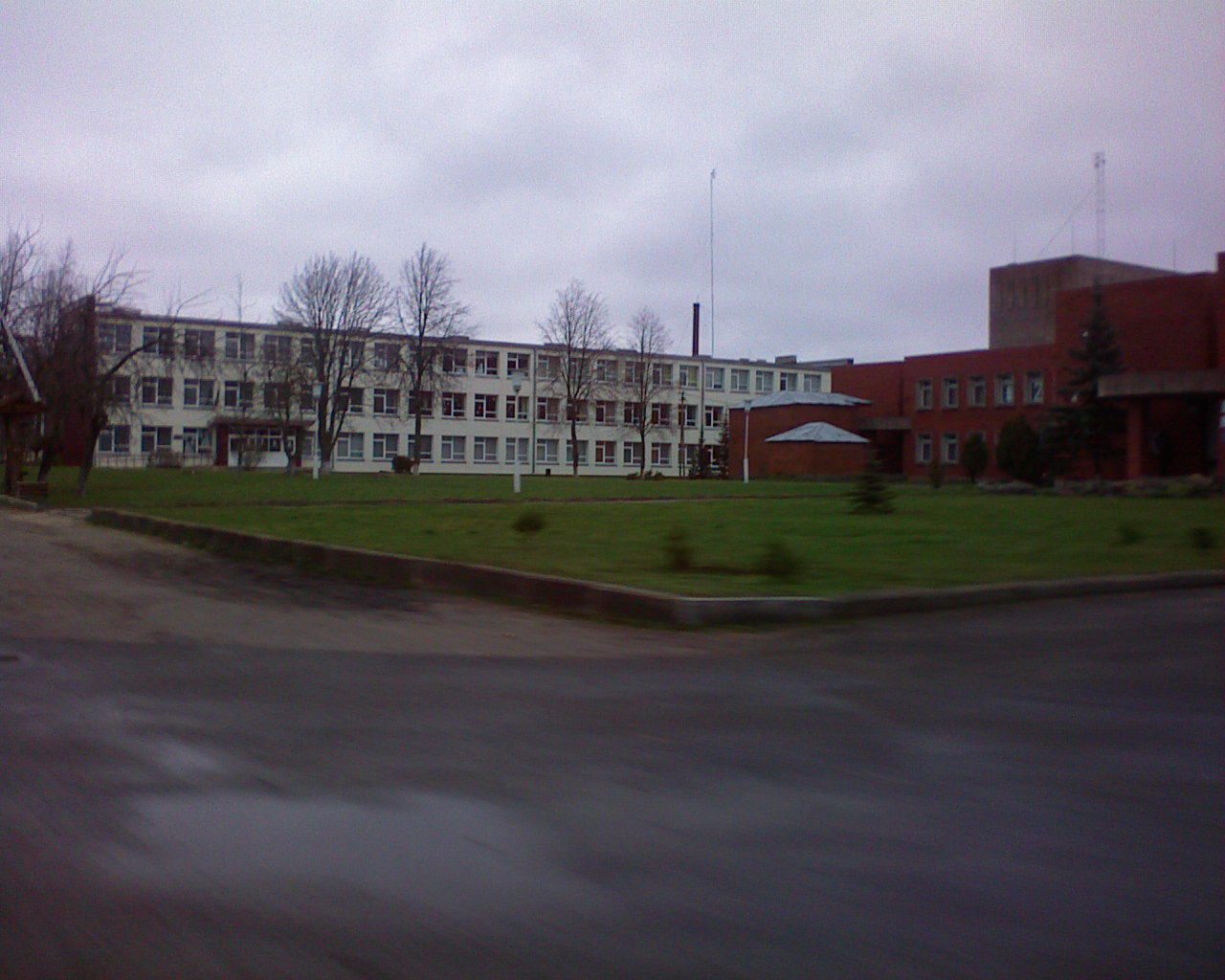

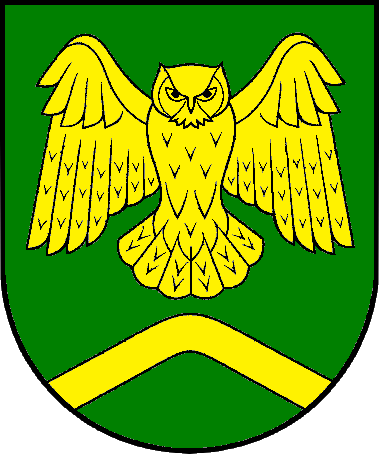
- Seal

- Location within Lithuania
- Coordinates: 56°11′30″N 21°19′0″E
- Country: Lithuania
- County: Klaipėda County

Population (2011)
  - Total: 647
- Time zone: UTC+2 (EET)
  - Summer (DST): UTC+3 (EEST)

Lenkimai is a small town in Klaipėda County, in northwestern Lithuania. According to the 2011 census, the town has a population of 647 people.
