= Papilė =

- Flag Coat of arms

- Location of Papilė
- Coordinates: 56°09′10″N 22°47′3″E
- Country: Lithuania
- Ethnographic region: Samogitia
- County: Šiauliai County
- Municipality: Akmenė district
- Elderate: Papilė eldrate
- First mentioned: 1339

Population (2011)
  - Total: 1,007

Papilė (Samogitian: Papėlė) is a town in Šiauliai County, Lithuania, near the river Venta.

== History ==
The settlement was first mentioned in 1339, after the area was raided by the Livonian Order. Two hill-forts have been preserved since this time.

After the Christianization of Samogitia, the settlement belonged to the Samogitian bishop, and the first church was built here in 1493. Since 1600 it has been known as a town. In 1703 the town was granted the privilege to hold a marketplace.

On July 22, 1941, A total of 40 Jewish men were killed by an Einsatzgruppen of 20 Lithuanian policemen and white armbanders (Lithuanian nationalists). Following the slaughter of the Jews, several Soviet supporters were brought to the murder site and killed making a total of 55 people massacred. The remains of the victims have been moved to the Papilė cemetery.

== Famous people ==
The anarchist Emma Goldman lived in the town for a short time as a child, when her father operated an inn here. In Papilė she became close friends with a servant of a family named Petrushka. While in Papilė, she witnessed a "half-naked human body being lashed with a knout"; this experience terrified her and contributed to her lifelong distaste for violent authority.

Papilė is also the location where Simonas Daukantas, the writer and historian, is buried.

Papilė is the birthplace of Abraham William Briscoe (1850–1917), who became a prominent businessman in Ireland. Abraham's son, Robert Briscoe (1894–1969), was an Irish revolutionary leader and legislator. Robert was the first Jew to serve as Lord Mayor of Dublin (1956-1957 and 1961–1962). Upon hearing that Dublin had elected a Jew as its mayor, the legendary American baseball player Yogi Berra famously quipped, "Only in America." Robert's son Ben (Abraham's grandson) also served as Lord Mayor of Dublin (1988–1989).

Ahron Dovid Burack, who became a prominent Orthodox rabbi and yeshiva leader in the United States, was born in Papilė in the early 1890s.

Chatzkel Lemchen, subject of the documentary “Uncle Chatzkel”, was born in Papile in 1904.

Samuel Gochin, grandfather of Holocaust activist Grant Arthur Gochin, was born in Papile in 1902.

== Papilė points of interest ==
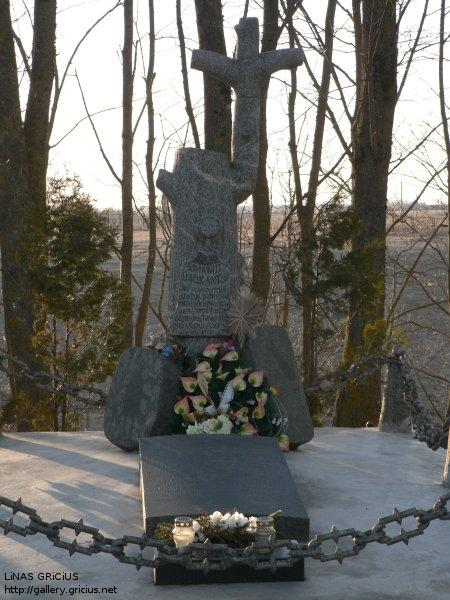
Grave of Simonas Daukantas

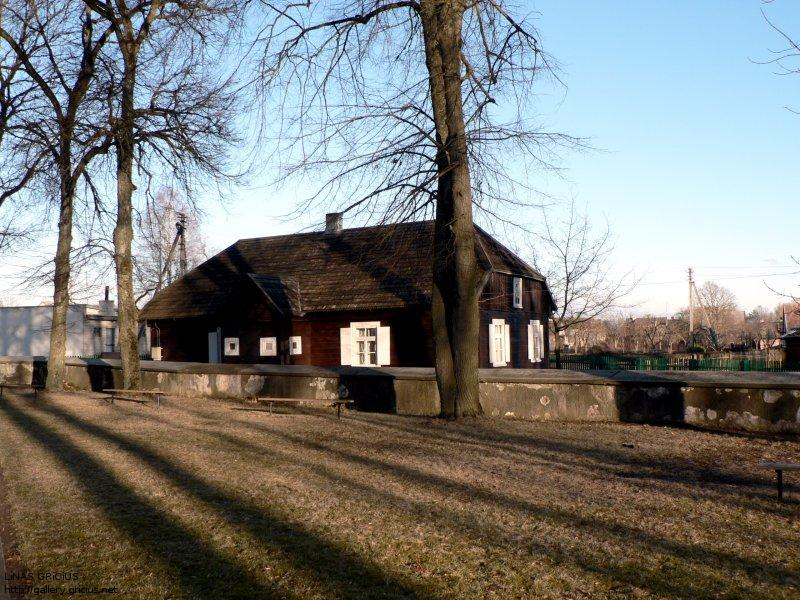
Simonas Daukantas Memorial Museum

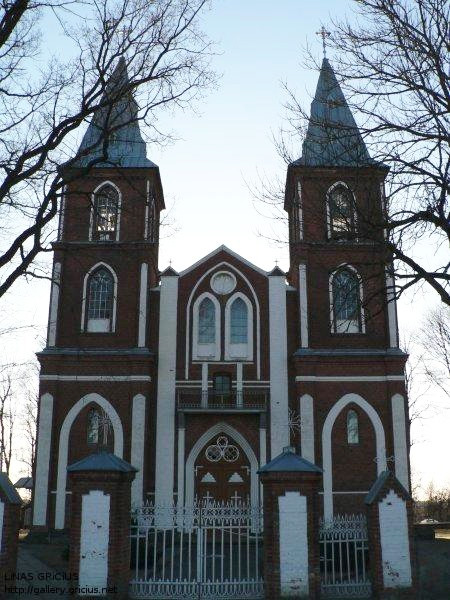
Papilė Church
