= Canons Regular of the Penitence of the Blessed Martyrs =

Roman Catholic religious order

Coat of arms of the order

The Canons Regular of the Penitence of the Blessed Martyrs (Latin: Ordo Canonicorum Regularium Mendicantium S. Mariae de Metro de Poenitentia Sanctorum Martyrum) was a small Roman Catholic religious order. It was a penitent order which followed the Rule of St. Augustine and emphasized piousness, asceticism, and devotion to the Holy Cross. Established in the 13th century, the order was initially based in Rome and had a few monasteries in Bohemia, Germany, England, perhaps Spain and France. The Bohemian branch with the main monastery in Prague became an independent order in 1628 and was suppressed in 1783. Most popular in the Kingdom of Poland (a total of five locations in the Diocese of Kraków with the main monastery in Kraków) and the Grand Duchy of Lithuania (a total of 18 locations in the Diocese of Vilnius with the main monastery in Videniškiai), the order was suppressed by the Tsarist authorities after the Uprising of 1831. The last monastery in Užupis closed in 1845. Blessed Michał Giedroyć (officially beatified in 2018) was a member of the order.

== Names and symbols ==
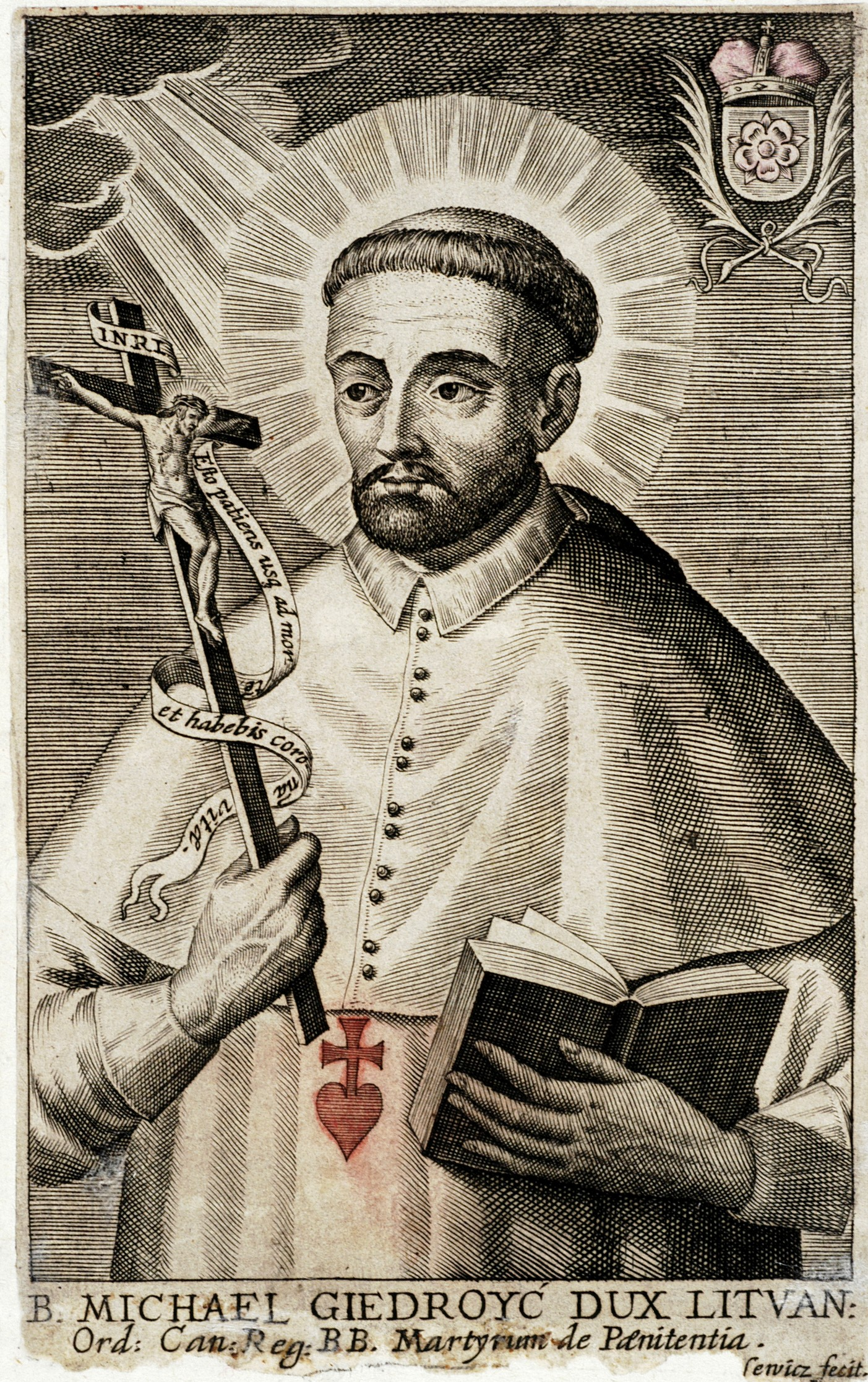
17th-century engraving of Michał Giedroyć wearing the white habit with the embroidered red emblem of the order

In their Latin name, "S. Mariae de Metro" referred to the Church of Santa Maria de Metrio in Rome where the order was originally based. The church is known only from written records and possibly was located near the Arch of Constantine; its name might be derived from Meta Sudans, a Roman fountain located nearby. It could also be a reference to Demetrius, an alleged Christian martyr who plays a role in the legends of the order's founding. In Lithuania, the order was known as baltieji Augustinai (White Augustinians) from their white robes. In Poland, the order was known as Markowie from their main center at the Church of St. Mark, Kraków. In Bohemia, they were known as Cyriaci after Judas Cyriacus who figured in the order's legends about its origins. It was also known as white crosiers or crosiers with red heart from the color of their robes or their emblem. The order's difficult and varied names introduce much confusion in historiography and obscure its origin and history. In particular, the order is often confused with other Crosiers.

The monks wore white habits with white scapulars and mozzettas. The scapular was embroidered with the symbol of the order – red heart with a red cross. A pierced heart is an attribute of Saint Augustine. White symbolized purity while red symbolized martyrdom and sacrifice. The meaning of the emblem could be summarized as "perfecting the heart by faithfully carrying the cross".

The order followed the Rule of St. Augustine. Its surviving constitutions (1612 from Poland and 1750 from Bohemia) are essentially copies of the Dominican constitutions. The order was particularly devoted to the crucifixion of Jesus and the Holy Cross as well as the early Christian martyrs (including a pseudo-martyr Demetrius). The order was known for its pastoral work. It was also described as a mendicant order, though this description is unclear and debatable. However, the information about the order's activities is very fragmentary as its rules prohibited publicizing one's work, and many libraries and archives were lost when the monasteries were closed.

== History ==
The origin of the order is unknown though it shares with other Crosiers the legends about its founding in the 1st century by Pope Anacletus and restoration by Empress Helena and Judas Cyriacus. The earliest known papal document referencing the order is by Pope Alexander IV from 9 April 1256 which mentioned three monasteries – in Rome, Alsfeld (Germany), and Kuyavia – that came under papal protection. In 1256, the order was invited by King Ottokar II of Bohemia to Prague where the monks built the Church of the Holy Cross (completed in 1356). In 1257, the order was invited to Poland by Duke Bolesław V the Chaste. The order was in danger of being suppressed by the Second Council of Lyon of 1272–1274.

In a papal bull of 1295, Pope Boniface VIII listed eight monasteries of the order – one in Rome, three in the Kingdom of Bohemia (two of them in Prague), two in the Kingdom of Poland, one in Germany, and one in an unknown island in Kuyavia. The order was invited to the Grand Duchy of Lithuania by King Władysław II Jagiełło in 1390 shortly after the official Christianization of Lithuania in 1387. The order also had monasteries in England (founded in Guildford in 1260) and perhaps in Spain and France. The monasteries in Spain were reportedly located in Sarria and Arzúa, both founded by pilgrims visiting the Camino de Santiago in the Kingdom of Galicia, and were incorporated into the Order of Hermits of Saint Augustine in 1567.

Initially based in Rome at the Church of the Sancta Mariae de Metro, the superior general later relocated to Prague in 1340. In 1420, during the Hussite Wars, the order fled Bohemia to Regensburg. At the time, four (Prague, Klášterec nad Orlicí, Pardubice, and Benátky nad Jizerou) monasteries were closed. The monks returned to Prague in 1436 but had to flee more permanently to Kraków in 1470. In the 16th century, the order's monasteries were located only in Poland and Lithuania. In 1628, after the Battle of White Mountain, the Canons Regular of Penitence returned to Prague but they were not satisfied with their Polish superior general. After a failed attempt to merge with the Belgian Canons Regular of the Order of the Holy Cross in 1673–1674, the Bohemian order became an autonomous and independent order in 1678. The new order became known as the Order of the Holy Cross with the Red Heart (Canonicus Ordo Crucigerorum cum Rubeo Corde). In 1715, they established an annual celebration in honor of Saint John of Nepomuk (killed in 1393) who, according to Bohuslav Balbín (1621–1688), was first buried in the Church of the Holy Cross of the order and only later transferred to St. Vitus Cathedral. The Navalis festival continues to be celebrated in Prague every 15 May. The Bohemian order was closed in 1783 due to Josephinism reforms introduced by Joseph II, Holy Roman Emperor.

As the number of monasteries in the Grand Duchy of Lithuania continued to grow, the order formed a separate Lithuanian province. As the monasteries in Poland closed down, the Lithuanian provincial superior based in Videniškiai became the superior general. The superior in Videniškiai had the title of infulatus, i.e. he had the right to wear bishop's insignia (mitre and crosier). After the failed anti-Tsarist Uprising of 1831, the Russian Empire implemented various Russification policies and closed all monasteries of the order except for one in Užupis which was attached to the Church of St. Bartholomew. This monastery also closed in 1845 bringing the end of the order.

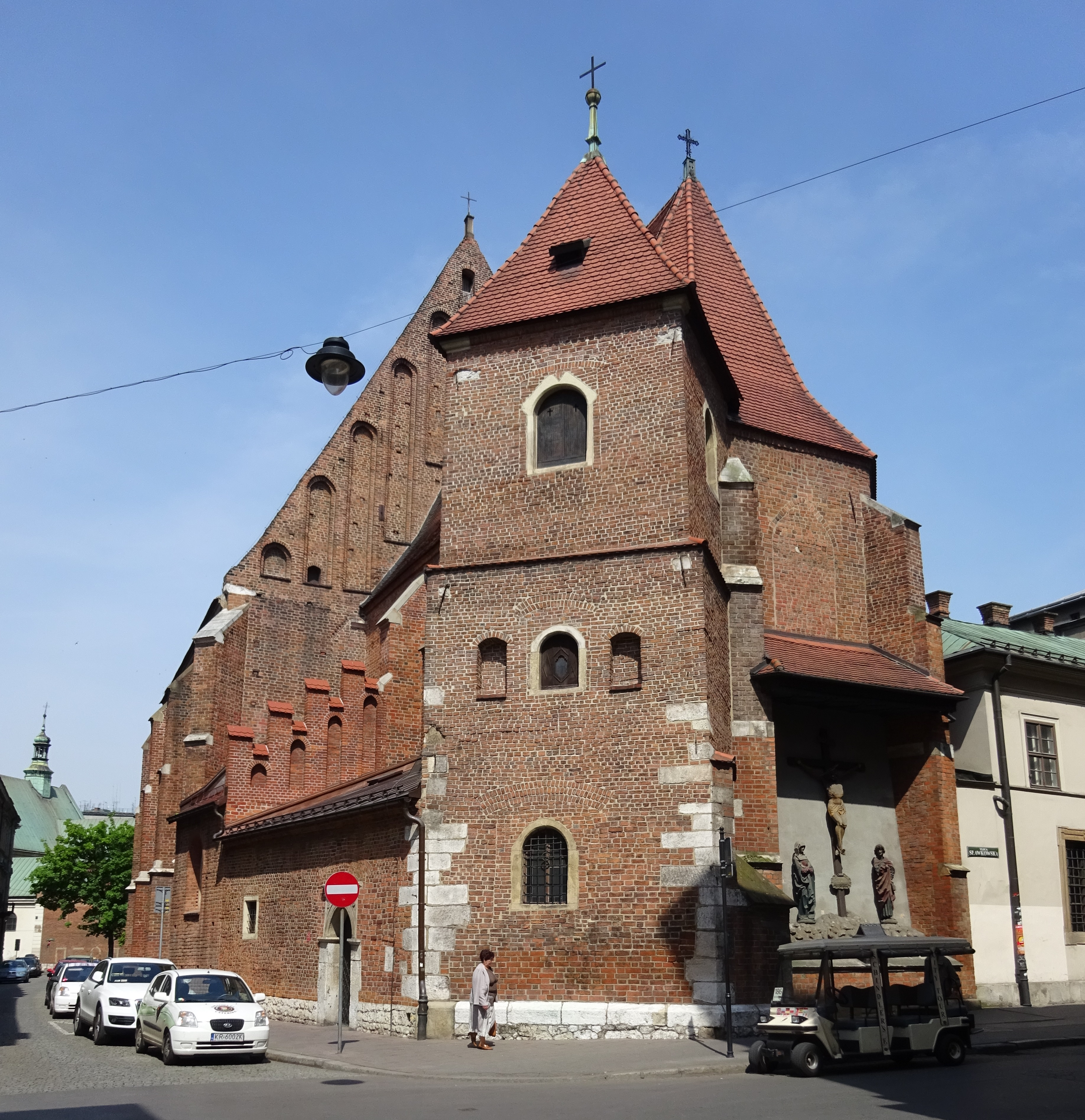
The main location of the order in Poland – Church of St. Mark in Kraków

== Members ==
The most famous member of the order were:

- Blessed Michał Giedroyć (died in 1485), known for his piety, was officially beatified in 2018
- Priest Jakub Sójecki of Przyrów (1579–1659)
- Michał Olszewski (c. 1712 – c. 1779), author of a popular Lithuanian-language collection of religious readings

== Monasteries in the Polish–Lithuanian Commonwealth ==
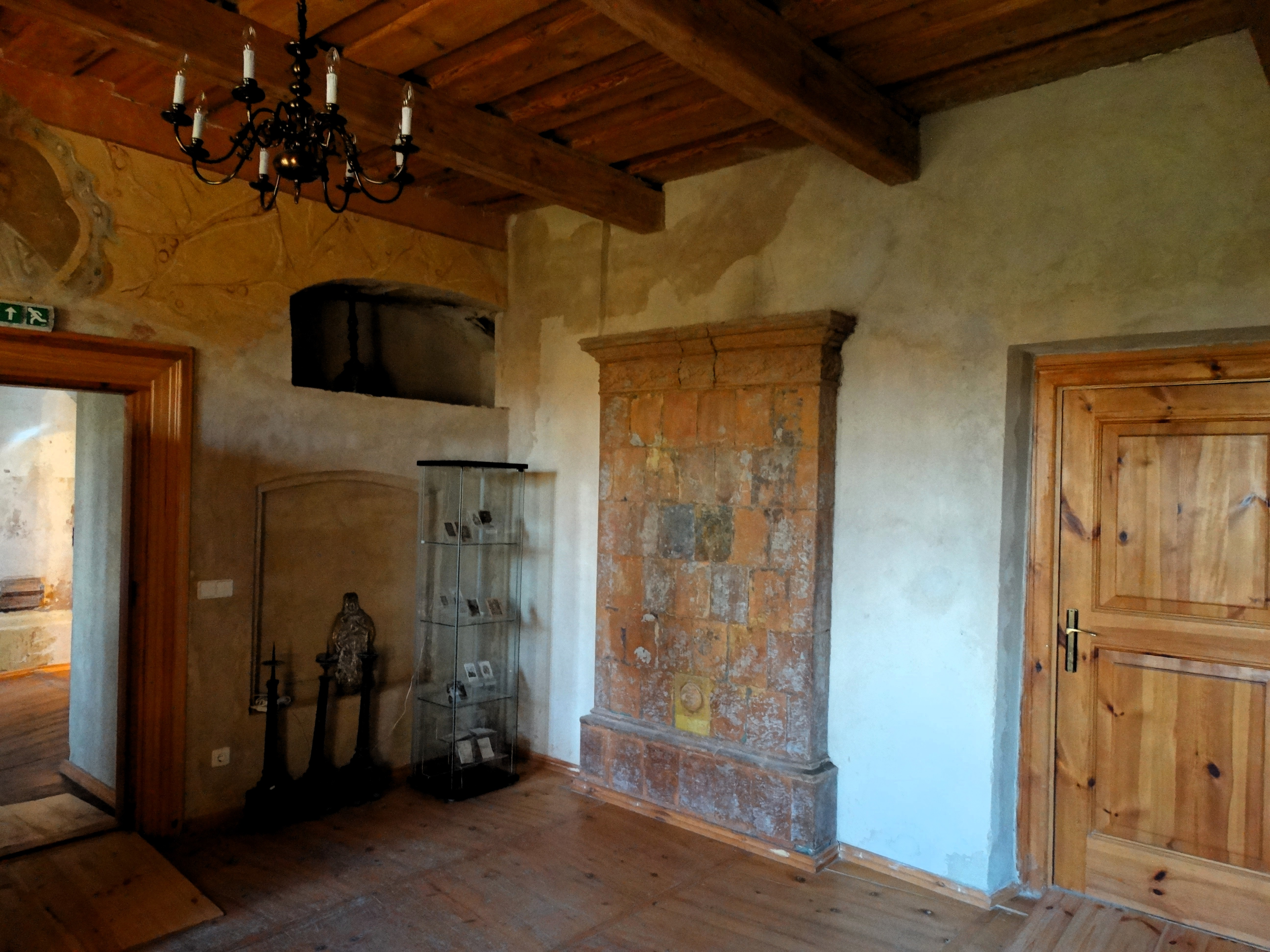
Interior of the former monastery in Videniškiai (now a museum)

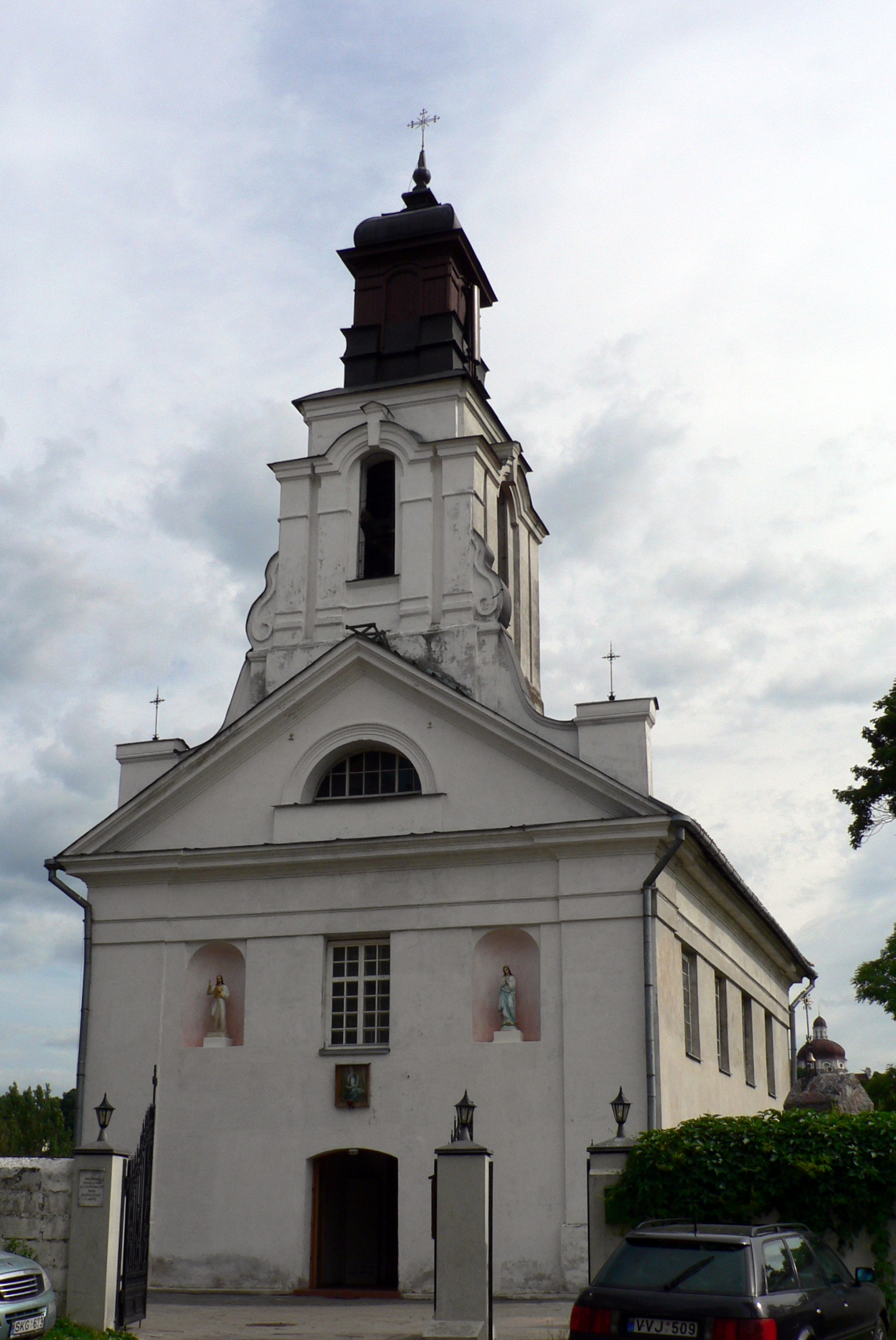
Church of St. Bartholomew where the last monastery was located

Location	Present-day country	Years active
Kraków	Poland	1257–1807
Trzciana	Poland	1262/1266 – 1816
Bystryca	Belarus	1390–1523
Medininkai	Lithuania	1390–1832
Near Tęgoborze	Poland	1400 – 1595/1610
Tverečius	Lithuania	1501–1832
Smalvos	Lithuania	1600–1832
Pilica	Poland	1610–1800
Videniškiai	Lithuania	1618–1832
Bogoria	Poland	1620–1827
Panemunis	Lithuania	1620–1832
Michališki	Belarus	1622–1832
Myory	Belarus	1641–1832
Užupis (Vilnius)	Lithuania	1644–1845
Paberžė	Lithuania	1650–1700
Skiemonys	Lithuania	1677–1832
Jūžintai	Lithuania	1695–1832
Kurkliai	Lithuania	1700–1832
Salakas	Lithuania	1721–1832
Papilys	Lithuania	1764–1832
Kvetkai	Lithuania	1770–1832
Glitiškės	Lithuania	1775–1810
Suvainiškis	Lithuania	1782–1832
