= Michał Olszewski =

Michał Olszewski may refer to:

- Michał Olszewski (chess player), (born 1989), Polish chess player
- Michał Olszewski (priest), (c. 1712 – c. 1779), Roman Catholic priest
