= Michał Giedroyć =

Lithuanian Roman Catholic noble

Blessed Michał Giedroyć
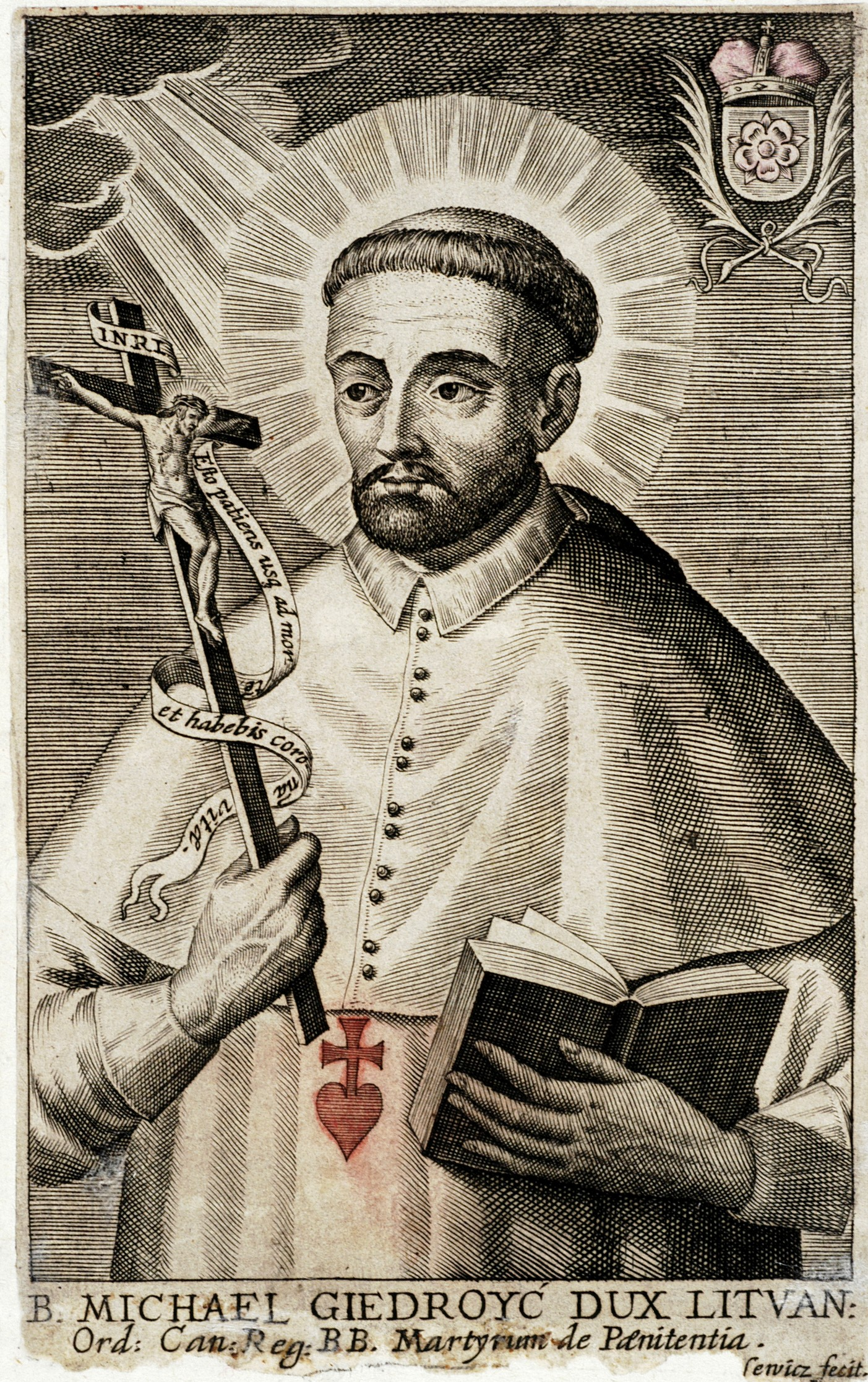
- 17th-century engraving of Giedroyć
- Born: c. 1425; Giedraičiai, Grand Duchy of Lithuania
- Died: 4 May 1485 (aged 59–60); Kraków, Kingdom of Poland
- Venerated in: Roman Catholic Church
- Beatified: 7 November 2018, Apostolic Palace, Vatican City by Pope Francis
- Feast: 4 May
- Patronage: Sick and disabled; Sacristans; Pontifical University of John Paul II; Congregation of the Sisters of Saint Hedwig

Michał Giedroyć (Lithuanian: Mykolas Giedraitis; c. 1425 – 4 May 1485) was a Lithuanian Roman Catholic noble and brother of the Canons Regular of the Penitence of the Blessed Martyrs. Giedroyć did not have any great accomplishments, but his life followed the Devotio moderna, a movement calling for genuine pious practices such as humility, obedience, and simplicity of life.

Giedroyć was born to a noble family in the Grand Duchy of Lithuania. One of his feet was paralyzed and he had to use crutches when walking. He later became a religious in the Canons Regular of the Penitence of the Blessed Martyrs, an Augustinian order. In 1460, he moved to Kraków, Kingdom of Poland, where he received a university degree and remained until his death. He lived an austere life as a hermit in a hut attached to the Church of St. Mark, Kraków where he served as a sacristan. He practiced self-flagellation. He was said to have received a vision from Jesus Christ and to have the gift of prophecy.

The cause for his canonization was launched sometime after his death and his relics were raised and enshrined in 1624. However, the beatification stalled and was abandoned in the 17th century. The cause was revived in the 1980s and in 2001 he was recognized as a Servant of God. On 7 November 2018, Pope Francis authorized his equipollent beatification due to recognition of his longstanding local cultus (veneration).

== Life ==
Michał Giedroyć was born around 1420–1425 to the princely Giedroyć family of Lithuanian nobles. His place of birth is usually indicated as Giedraičiai, but some researchers suggest it could be Videniškiai. His year of birth is not known and is estimated based on his signature witnessing a donation by the Radziwiłł family to the Franciscans in Vilnius in 1439 – i.e. he had to be at least 15-years old. The Grand Duchy of Lithuania was officially converted to Catholicism only in 1387, making Giedroyć only the second generation to be baptized.

He suffered from frail health including lower than average height. A childhood accident left one of his feet paralyzed and he had to use crutches. Later examination of his remains revealed one of his legs was much shorter than the other. His disability likely influenced his later hermit tendencies and his devotion to crucified Christ. He did not want to be a burden and wanted to serve others. Therefore, he started making boxes (most likely from wood) for the Eucharist that could be brought to the sick in their homes.

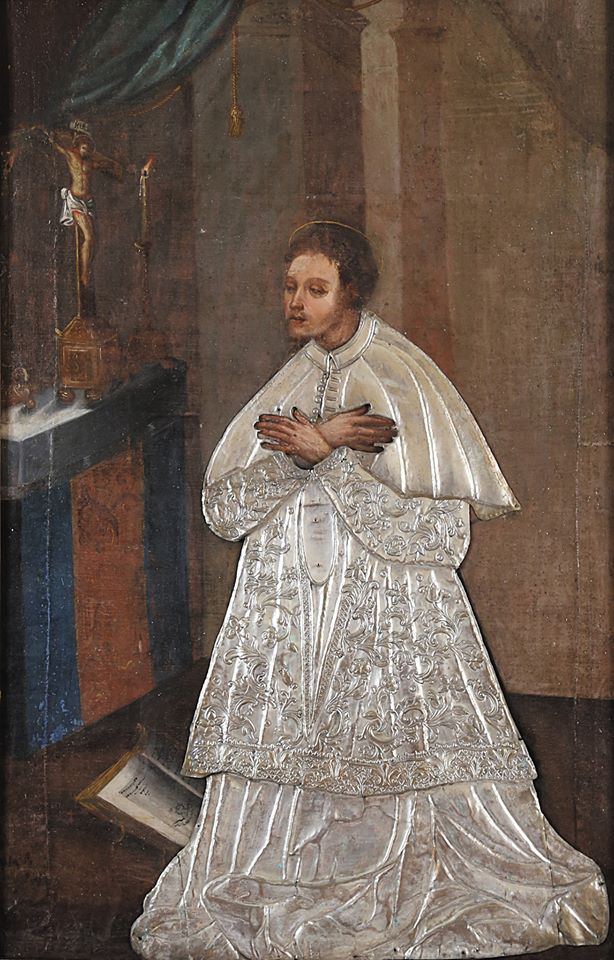
Painting of Giedroyć from Videniškiai with silver plated riza from mid-18th century

He joined the Canons Regular of the Penitence of the Blessed Martyrs, an Augustinian order that had a convent in Bystryca in present-day Belarus. They wore a white robe with a symbol of a red heart in front and thus were known as the White Augustinians. In 1460, together with the general superior of an Augustinian monastery and several other novices, he left for Kraków and the following year enrolled into the Jagiellonian University. He studied the liberal arts and graduated with a bachelor's degree in 1465. However, Lithuanian researcher Paulius Rabikauskas argued that the university records related to a different person by the same name as his early hagiographies (written by university professors) mentioned nothing about his university education until student lists were publicized by Albert Wijuk Kojałowicz in 1650. He became close friends with Świętosław Milczący and also knew fellow Augustinian Izajasz Boner. His contemporaries in Kraków included holy men John Cantius, Stanisław Kazimierczyk, Szymon of Lipnica, and Ladislas of Gielniów. The group was said to bring Felix saeculum Cracoviae (the happy age of Krakow).

After his studies, Giedroyć became a sacristan at the Church of St. Mark. He received permission from his superiors to live as a hermit in a tiny hut attached to the church. He was not ordained as a priest and remained a religious brother helping clean, maintain, and decorate the church. He lived a reclusive and austere life and practiced mortifications and self-flagellation. Attracted by his charism, people started seeking out Giedroyć for his advice and prayer as they believed that he could prophesy. He ate poorly, refusing meat and often fasting on bread and salt alone. He most frequently prayed to the crucifix and image of the Madonna. The image of the Madonna is now known as the Madonna Giedroyciowa or Matka Boska Giedroyciowa. His prayers to Christ were so intense that he is said to have received a vision and heard Christ speak from the cross. According to a latter tradition, Christ spoke the words from the Revelation 2: Be faithful until death, and I will give you the crown of life. The crucifix now hangs in the main altar of the church.

Giedroyć died in 1485 and his remains were interred in the Church of Saint Mark. He was buried in the presbytery, on the left to the main altar. According to his hagiography, the divine message to bury him in such a prominent place was delivered by Świętosław Milczący.

== Veneration and miracles ==
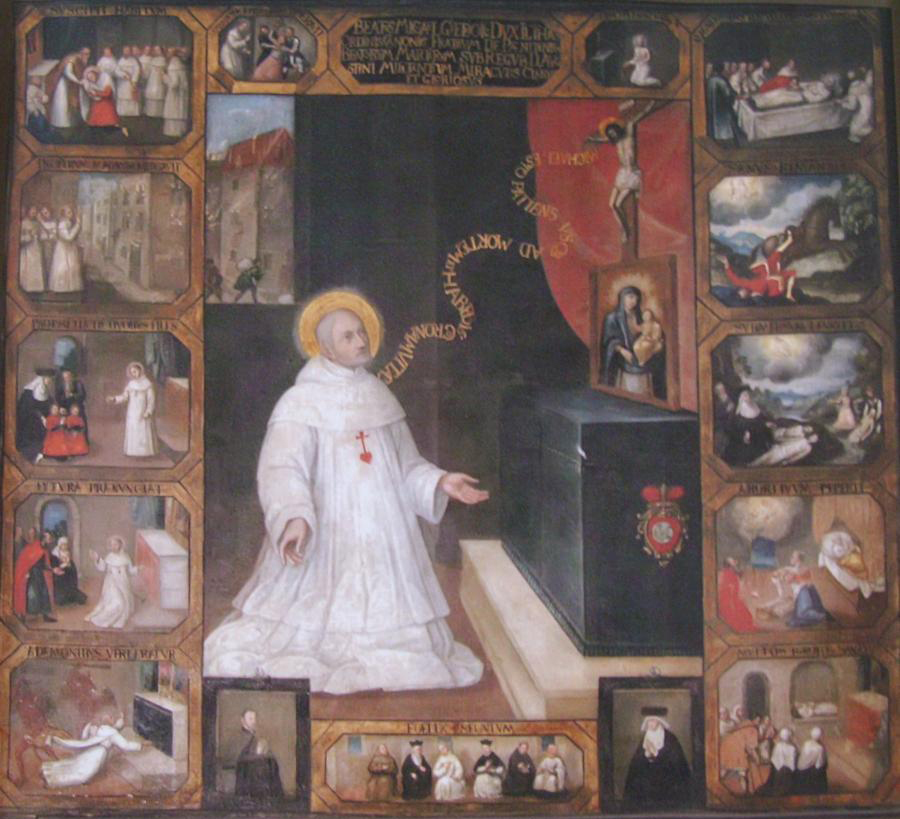
Painting of Giedroyć's vision with twelve scenes from his life and of other miracles

The first mention of Giedroyć and his pious life comes from Chronica Polonorum written by Maciej Miechowita in 1519. A complete hagiography was written by Jan of Trzciana, a professor at the Jagiellonian University, in 1544. Published in 1605 in Latin and in 1615 in Polish, it remains the main source of information on Giedroyć's life. There is evidence that there was an earlier manuscript written right after Giedroyć's death but it was lost in a church fire in 1494 or 1520. Researchers count five published biographies of Giedroyć in the 17th century, eight in the 18th century, and fourteen in the 19th century.

His grave was first opened in 1521 and his remains were found in good condition. The first known votive painting is from 1521. It was gifted by a city resident in gratitude for reviving her stillborn child and depicted the miracle. In 1614–1615, five soldiers of the Polish–Muscovite War (1605–1618) left votive paintings in gratitude for surviving the war.

His tomb was reopened again on 4 June 1624 and his relics were translated to a new sarcophagus suitable for public veneration on 11 August 1625. A late Renaissance tomb which survives to this day was built at the same time. In 1624, a large painting was completed depicting key scenes from Giedroyć's life. The central part depicts the key miracle – the message from the crucified Jesus. In a window behind him, there are burning houses and people rushing away – a reference to the tradition confirmed by Miechowita that Giedroyć was a protector from fires. Twelve smaller scenes illustrate episodes from his life on the left and miracles attributed to him on the right. These episodes include the miraculous rescue of the church of St. Mark from a fire, satanic torture that Giedroyć experienced during his prayers, and prophesying to city residents. His posthumous miracles include the message delivered by Świętosław Milczący regarding the proper burial place for Giedroyć, healing of Katarzyna Rybarka (she was a possessed woman and it was the first recorded posthumous miracle attributed to Giedroyć), saving two young boys from drowning (a son of a Hungarian merchant who drowned in the Danube and a boy in the village of Spytkowice), and reviving a stillborn child. At the bottom, there are portraits of six other holy men who were Giedroyć's contemporaries in Kraków.

His cult continued to center in Poland and particularly Kraków, but also spread to Lithuania in the 17–18th centuries. Paintings of him can be found in churches of Videniškiai, Giedraičiai, and Tverečius. His paintings were mentioned in church records but do not survive in Veliuona, Jūžintai, and Papilys. The church in Videniškiai was founded by his relatives, Martynas Marcelis Giedraitis and Bishop Merkelis Giedraitis. In 1617, Martynas Marcelis also founded a monastery of the Canons Regular of the Penitence in Videniškiai. The painting of Giedroyć originally hung in a chapel-mausoleum where members of the Giedroyć family were interred. In September 2019, a relic of Giedroyć was solemnly installed in the Church of the Assumption of the Blessed Virgin Mary, Vilnius, by Archbishop Gintaras Grušas.

== Beatification ==
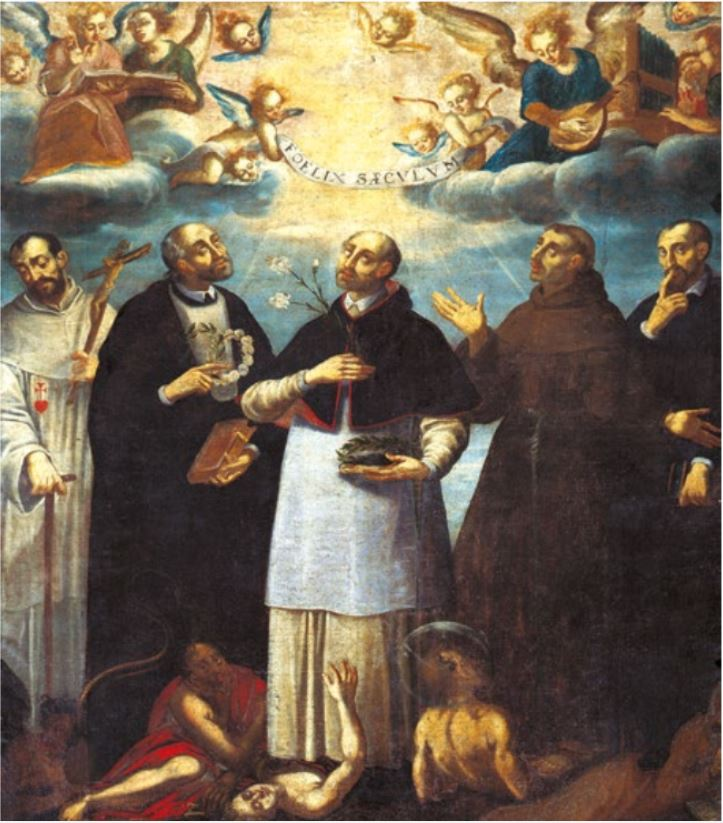
Faelix Saeculum Cracoviae: holy men who lived in Kraków in the 15th century. Giedroyć is on the left

Giedroyć's burial in the presbytery might be an indication of plans for his beatification already at the time of his death. However, the Protestant Reformation attacked the cult of saints and there were no new canonizations between 1523 and 1588. Cardinal Jerzy Radziwiłł (1556–1600) investigated the possibility of his canonization. The 1620s saw a surge in his veneration, but Pope Urban VIII issued a decree in March 1625 that codified rules of beatification and restricted certain signs of veneration or holiness (e.g. depiction of haloes) only to those who were officially beatified or canonized. In 1634, the pope further removed bishops' right to beatify people and reserved it to the pope. It is likely that Giedroyć's beatification efforts were abandoned because of these new rules. His congregation, the Canons Regular of the Penitence, declined and was suppressed by the authorities of the Russian Empire in 1832.

The cult of Giedroyć was revived in 1980s largely due to the efforts of Wacław Świerzawski who became rector of St. Mark's in 1968. He organized a small sanctuary known as Giedroycianum and regular masses in Giedroyć's honor. The sanctuary consists of three rooms: the Hall of Roots with memorabilia of the Canons Regular of the Penitence, the White Room with a Gothic and Renaissance triptych from 1520 which depicts Giedroyć with Casimir Jagiellon before the Mother of God, and a chapel dedicated to Our Lady of Giedroyć (Matka Boska Giedroyciowa). The 500th anniversary of Giedroyć's death in 1985 was marked with a large ceremony presided by Cardinal Józef Glemp at the St. Mary's Basilica, Kraków. Pope John Paul II sent a letter supporting renewed interest in Giedroyć. The beatification case was re-launched by Cardinal Franciszek Macharski alongside fellow Cardinals Józef Glemp and Henryk Gulbinowicz. The Kraków Archdiocese closed the diocesan stage on 24 April 1998. Giedroyć became a Servant of God on 27 July 2001 after the Congregation for the Causes of Saints (CCS) issued the nihil obstat (no objections) decree which meant the beatification process could go ahead. In 2017, the postulation submitted the positio dossier to the CCS for further assessment. On 7 November 2018, Pope Francis beatified him and authorized the CCS to promulgate the decree on his heroic virtues and on the confirmation of his cult since time immemorial (i.e. equipollent beatification which is used when the canonical process is not possible due to the lack of sufficient historical sources).

== Bibliography ==
- Ahlgren, Gillian T. W. (1998). Teresa of Avila and the Politics of Sanctity. Cornell University Press. ISBN 9780801485725.
- Congregazione delle Cause dei Santi. "Decreti Pubblicati nel 2018" (in Italian).
- Giniūnienė, Asta (2004). "Dievo tarno Mykolo Giedraičio ikonografija" (PDF). Acta Academiae Artium Vilnensis (in Lithuanian). 35. Pirmavaizdis ir kartotė: Vaizdinių transformacijos tyrimai. ISSN 1392-0316.
- Giniūnienė, Asta (May 2015). "Palaimintasis Mykolas Giedraitis". Magnificat (in Lithuanian). 5 (63).
- Jagminas, Leonardas (2018-08-01). "atgailos kanauninkai". Visuotinė lietuvių enciklopedija (in Lithuanian). Mokslo ir enciklopedijų leidybos centras.
- Katolicka Agencja Informacyjna (8 June 2019). "Dziękczynienie za beatyfikację Bł. Michała Giedroycia" (in Polish).
- Made in Vilnius (15 September 2019). "Palaimintojo Mykolo Giedraičio relikvijos atkeliauja į Vilnių" (in Lithuanian). Naujosios medijos grupė.
- Misztal, Henryk (1985). "Sprawa beatyfikacji Michała Giedroycia". Analecta Cracoviensia (in Polish). XVII: 427. doi:10.15633/acr.3242. ISSN 2391-6842.
- Prašmantaitė, Aldona (2019-05-29) [2004]. "Mykolas Giedraitis". Visuotinė lietuvių enciklopedija (in Lithuanian). Mokslo ir enciklopedijų leidybos centras.
- Rabikauskas, Paulius (2002). Krikščioniškoji Lietuva (in Lithuanian). Aidai. ISBN 9955-445-36-X.
- Sielepin, Adelajda (2018). "Michael Giedrojć (1420?–1485): A Christian of Timeless Spirituality. Before His Beatification" (PDF). Soter. 65 (93): 21–40. doi:10.7220/2335-8785.65(93).2. ISSN 2335-8785.
- Śnieżyńska-Stolot, Ewa; Krzysztofowicz-Kozakowska, Stefania (1989). "Obrazki wotywne przy grobie Michała Giedroycia" (PDF). Nasza Przeszłość: Studia z dziejów Kościoła i kultury katolickiej w Polsce (in Polish). 71. ISSN 0137-3218.
- Swierzawski, Wacław (1985). "Michał Giedroyć (1425–1485). Życie i duchowość". Analecta Cracoviensia (in Polish). XVII: 401. doi:10.15633/acr.3241. ISSN 2391-6842.
- Woźniak, Krystyna. "Giedroycianum" (in Polish). Bractwo Świętej Zofii czyli Mądrości Bożej.
- Zabielski, Wojciech (12 November 2015). "Michał Giedroyć zw. błogosławionym". Przewodnik Kraków (in Polish).
