= Crosiers =

Loose confederation of Catholic orders

The Crosiers or Brethren of the Cross or crutched friars is a general name for several loosely related Catholic orders, mostly canons regular. Their names derive from their devotion to the Holy Cross. They were founded in the 12th and 13th centuries, during the era of the crusades in the Holy Land. These orders tended to maintain hospitals and care for the sick. Currently, the term "crosiers" most frequently refers to the Canons Regular of the Order of the Holy Cross originating from Belgium, but it could also refer to at least five other orders from Jerusalem, Portugal, Italy, Bohemia, Poland–Lithuania, and a group of friars in England and Ireland.

== Related orders ==
The Canons Regular of the Holy Sepulchre in Jerusalem were sometimes referred to as crosiers with the double red cross. The order was founded in 1114 to care for the Church of the Holy Sepulchre built where Jesus was crucified. The male order was suppressed by Pope Innocent VIII in 1489 though the female order continues to exist.

The Portuguese Canons Regular of the Holy Cross of Coimbra (Ordo Canonicorum Regularium Sanctae Crucis, ORC) was founded by Saint Theotonius in Coimbra in 1132. The order was closed during the brief reign of Pedro IV in 1834, but restored in 1979. The order's mother house is the Monastery of Santa Cruz in Coimbra. It maintains presence in Europe (Germany, Austria, Holland, Italy, Portugal and Switzerland), in the Americas (Brazil, United States and Mexico), and in Asia (Philippines and India).

The Italian Order of the Crociferi (Ordo Cruciferorum; Fratres Cruciferi) was established between 1160 and 1170 by Pope Alexander III. It became popular in Italy and had 208 monasteries divided into five provinces. They wore a blue habit and carried a silver cross. The order was abolished by Pope Alexander VII in 1656.

The Belgian or Flemish Canons Regular of the Order of the Holy Cross (Ordo Sanctae Crucis, OSC) is traditionally said to be founded by canon Theodore of Celles in Huy in 1210. The order was confirmed by Pope Innocent IV in 1248. Many monasteries were closed during the French Revolution and the Napoleonic Wars, but the order was revived. Its superior general is based at San Giorgio in Velabro in Rome. As well as surviving in Belgium and the Netherlands, it today maintains a presence in Germany, Austria, United States, Brazil, the Congo, and Indonesia.

The Bohemian Knights of the Cross with the Red Star (Ordo Militaris Crucigerorum cum Rubea Stella, OMCRS) was founded in 1233 by Agnes of Bohemia. Unlike the other orders, this is a military order dedicated to the protection and care of the sick, and was made an independent hospitaller order by Pope Gregory IX in 1237. They spread into Moravia, Silesia, Hungary, and Poland. It is believed they had three houses in Scotland. The order is currently active in the Czech Republic and Austria (Vienna).

The origin of the Polish–Lithuanian Canons Regular of the Penitence of the Blessed Martyrs (Ordo Canonicorum Regularium Mendicantium S. Mariae de Metro de Poenitentia Sanctorum Martyrum) is unknown. When it was first mentioned in 1256, it already had three monasteries. Originating from Rome, it was most popular in the Kingdom of Poland and the Grand Duchy of Lithuania. It was suppressed by the Russian Empire in 1832 and the last monastery closed in 1845. The Bohemian Order of the Holy Cross with the Red Heart (Canonicus Ordo Crucigerorum cum Rubeo Corde) separated from the Canons Regular of Penance of the Blessed Martyrs and became an independent order in 1628. This order was closed in 1783 due to Josephinism reforms introduced by Joseph II, Holy Roman Emperor.

The first Friars of the Cross or the Crutched Friars (also crossed or crouched friars) arrived to England sometime between 1230 and 1244. At least five of the Orders of the Holy Cross established some presence in England creating a great confusion as to which order they properly belonged. The Crutched Friars are sometimes further confused with the Trinitarians or the Hospitallers. The presence of the orders of Jerusalem, Bohemia, and Poland–Lithuania was brief and episodic. Earlier literature attributed the Crutched Friars to the Italian Crosiers, but later it was proven that they were a branch of the Belgian order. The Crutched Friars were also present in Ireland where they established 17 priory hospitals by the early 13th century. The Crutched Friars were suppressed during the Dissolution of the Monasteries in 1538.

== Legendary origins ==
Several of the orders claimed the same legendary origins. The Italian order was founded by a certain Cletus who might have been a crusader. A later tradition identified this Cletus as the 1st-century Pope Anacletus. A 130-line Latin poem Ad colendam mente pura (To cultivate a pure mind) is the earliest record of the legend about the order's foundations. The poem states that when Empress Helena discovered the True Cross, she selected twelve men to protect it. These men wore a cross on their clothes and became members of the Brethren of the Cross. However, they all were killed and the order was liquidated. Five canons from Germany were inspired to restore the order and received approval from Pope Innocent who told them to follow the Rule of St. Augustine. Later accounts embellished the story. For example, one of the twelve men was identified as Judas Cyriacus who later became Bishop of Jerusalem, or that the five men participated in the Third Crusade. The stories of Cletus and Helena were merged by claiming that Helena only restored the order first established by Pope Anacletus. Later stories also added details significant and specific to the individual order.

== Emblems ==
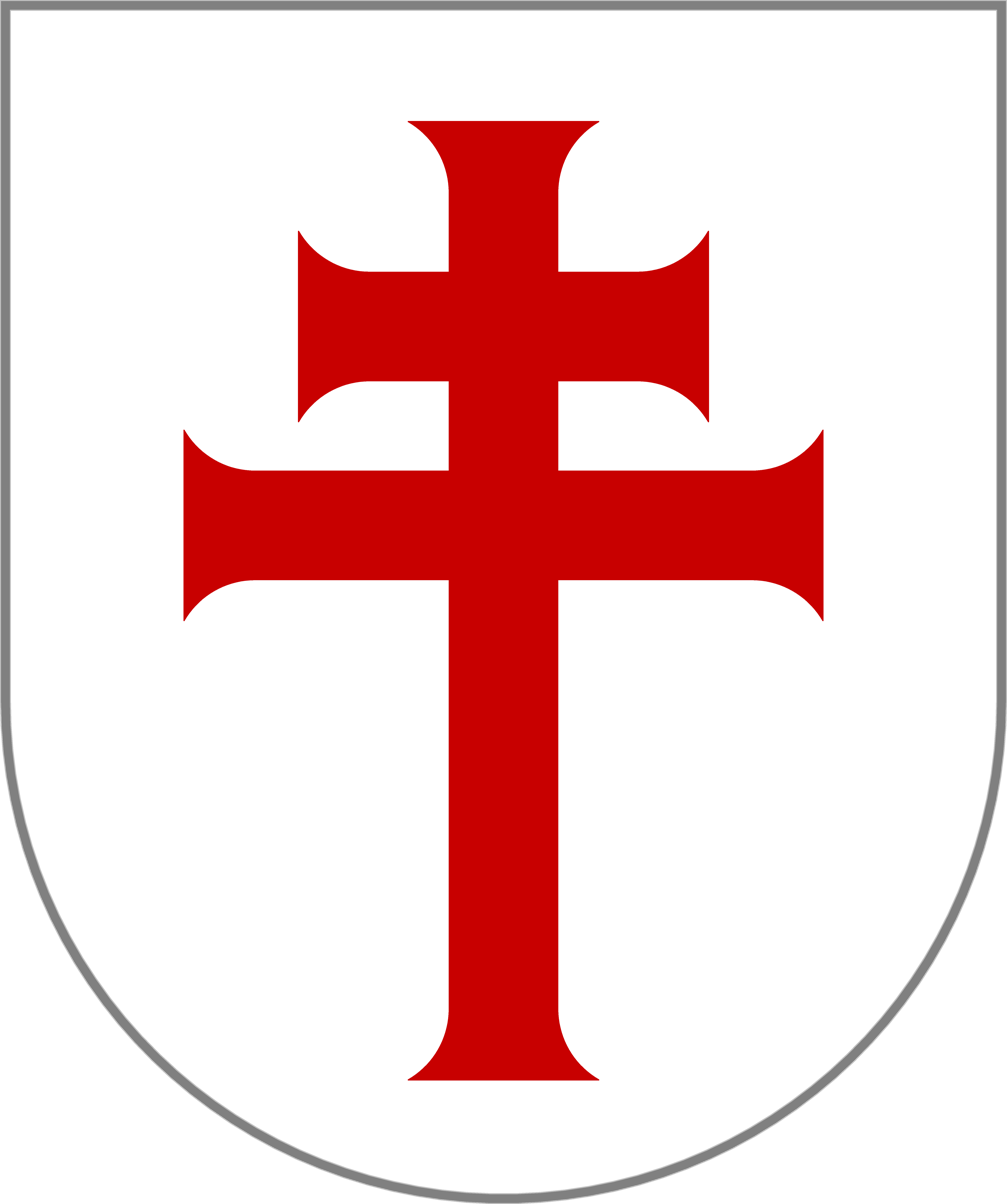
Canons Regular of the Holy Sepulchre

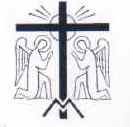
Canons Regular of the Holy Cross of Coimbra

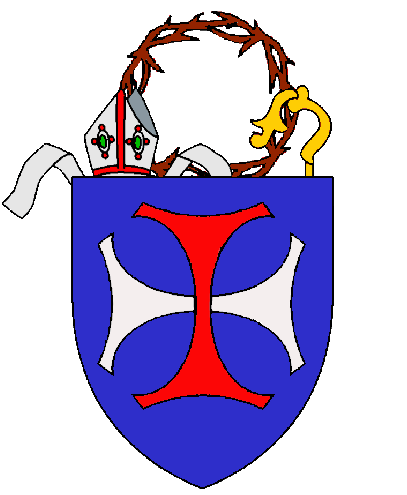
Canons Regular of the Order of the Holy Cross

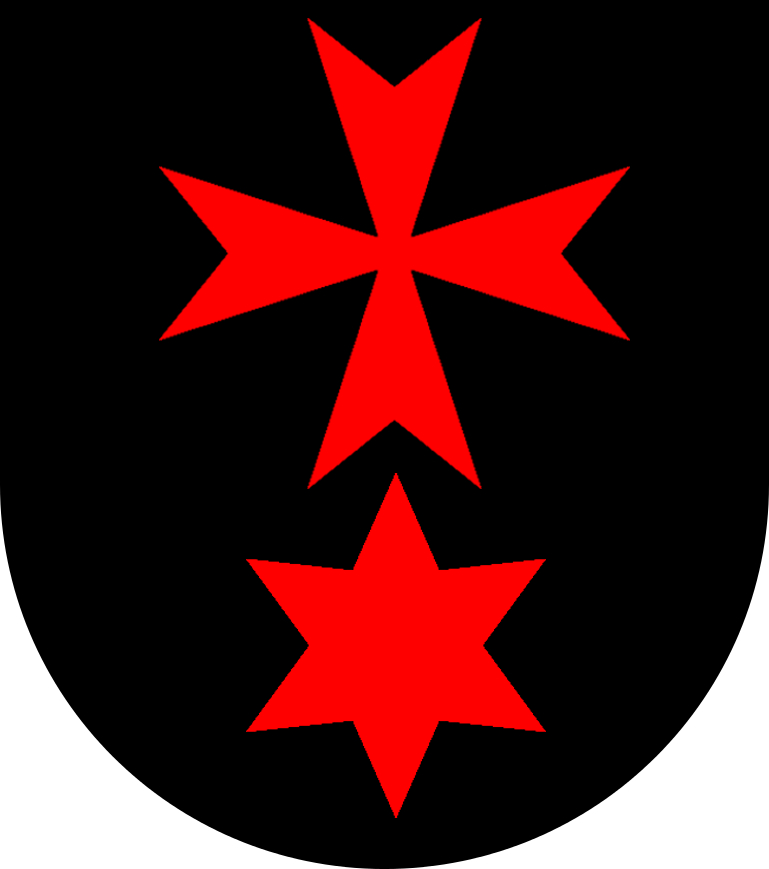
Knights of the Cross with the Red Star

Canons Regular of the Penitence of the Blessed Martyrs
