= Penitent order =

Christian movement

The Penitents are a Christian order that goes back to the 4th century. Those who had committed serious sins confessed their sins to the bishop or his representative and were assigned a penance that was to be carried out over a period of time. After completing their penance, they were reconciled by the bishop with a prayer of absolution offered in the midst of the community. Penance assumed many forms, such as pilgrimages to holy sites; constructing, repairing, and rebuilding churches; and caring for the poor and sick.

During the time they worked out their penances, the penitents often had special places in church and wore special garments to indicate their status. Like the catechumens, who were preparing for baptism, they were often dismissed from the Sunday assembly after the Liturgy of the Word. The use of ashes at the beginning of Lent is an extension of the use of ashes with those entering the Order of Penitents.

== Penitential Movement ==
Penance in the Judeo-Christian sense can be traced to the time just after the Babylonian exile (Sirach 5:1–8; 34: 21–31). The repentance and conversion preached by John the Baptist was of this type.

In the first centuries of the Christian Church, groups of penitents were established by the Church for those Christians who fell into grave sin and sought reconciliation with the Church. These sins included such things as adultery, murder, idolatry and magic, and theft. Doing penance was a visible sign of conversion. A sinner who refused to do penance was excommunicated. Public penance consisted of acts of mortification such as wearing a "hair shirt," covering the head with ashes, fasting and prayers. These acts were regulated by the bishops. After the period of penance was completed, the repentant sinner was readmitted into the assembly.

The AD 313 Edict of Milan declared that the bishop could relegate the sinner into an Order of Penitents called Conversi. That was done in a liturgical ceremony with the laying on of hands and the application of ashes. They worshiped separately from the rest of the congregation and were not allowed to participate in the Eucharistic celebration. Other restrictions imposed by the bishop were called interdicts, and by the 4th century, some of these interdicts came to be imposed not only for the penitential period but for life.

By the 4th century, there were those who entered the Order of Penitents voluntarily. They accepted the interdicts of the Order, which by then included:

- not to participate in military service
- not to be merchants
- not to occupy public office
- to refrain from conjugal relations if married and to be celibate if single
- not to remarry if widowed
- not to marry if single while in the Order (this was later abrogated)

=== 5th and 6th centuries ===
Monastic asceticism, which was popularized by the Desert Fathers of the East, such as St. Anthony the Great and St. Basil, moved into Europe. St. Benedict of Nursia was the founder of western or Benedictine monasticism in A.D. 529. The emphasis was on communal living under a rule and a life given to prayer, work, and charity. Entering a monastery became a substitute for public penance. In the monasteries, a penitential tax or private penance was developed, which was less strenuous than the public penances. That was the beginning of penitential commutation.

=== 7th to 11th centuries ===
In Italy and Spain, public or Roman Penance was dominant. Those upon whom penance was imposed and those who accepted the life voluntarily were forbidden to associate with the militia saecularis or secular militia, including holding civil offices or being a merchant (militia saecularis togata) and bearing arms (militia saecularis paludata). Fasting, which had always been part of the penitential discipline, became more regularized, and three major times of fasting were observed: Advent, Lent (prior to Easter), and a period after Pentecost. There were also two minor Lents. Other periods of fasting and abstinence could be imposed.

=== 12th and 13th centuries ===
The penitential movement became popular among the laity after the Gregorian Reform at the end of the 11th century. Introduced around AD 950, corporal penance, or voluntary flagellation, became more known. Also almsgiving became more common as a penitential act. There was also the rise of the Donati and the Oblates, who put themselves in the service of God by attaching themselves in service to a particular church or monastery. In all cases, the emphasis of the penance was to practice justice and mercy, to trust in God, to be of pure heart and intent, to have a zeal for Christ and the Scripture, and to be open to God's grace and inspiration. Most of the participants had little or no formal theological training, and many developed heretical beliefs.

== Types of penitents ==
- Married conversi – continued to live with their family but partially or fully abstained from conjugal relations.
- Voluntary pilgrims – went on pilgrimages to the Holy Land or to more local shrines if that were not possible.
- Hermits – lived alone or with one or two companions in the wild, in grottos and caves or even in the hollows of trees.
- Religious virgins – not nuns and lived with family
- Recluses – women who consecrated themselves to God without entering a religious institution

== Character of penitents ==
- Attire – tunic, walking-stick, cincture (belt), knapsack, sandals; symbol was often a Tau Cross after St. Anthony of the Desert.
- Charitable works – most often in hospitals and hospices and leprosaria (hospitalers); restoring churches and burying the dead.
- Life of Prayer.
- Abstinence – from feasts and shows and dances, avoidance of drunkenness and gluttony.
- Prohibited from public office or from riding horses.
- Forbidden to take up arms or to take an oath.

== Orders of penitents ==
Umiliati
The Umiliati were established in northern Italy. Innocent III approved their way of life or Propositum in 1201. In 1208, he approved the "Propositum" of the Poveri Cattolici and in 1210 that of the Poveri Lombardi.

Penitents of Assisi
Established as a lay order by St. Francis of Assisi, their full name was viri poenitentiales de civitate Assisii oriundi ("penitents from the town of Assisi"). They eventually they became the Secular Franciscan Order.

Penitents or Hermits of St. John the Baptist
A community near Pamplona, in the Kingdom of Navarre, leading a life of mortification and silence and assembling only for the chanting of the Divine Office. They received the approbation of Gregory XIII (c. 1515), who appointed a provincial for them.

A community founded in France about 1630 by Michel de Sabine for the reform of abuses among the hermits. Only those of the most edifying lives were chosen as members, and rules were drawn up which were approved for their dioceses by the Bishops of Metz and Le Puy-en-Velay.

Canons Regular of the Penitence of the Blessed Martyrs
There are various opinions as to the period of foundation, some dating it back to the time of Pope Cletus, but it is certain that the order was flourishing in Poland and Lithuania in the second half of the 13th century, the most important monastery being that of St. Mark at Kraków, where the religious lived under the Rule of St. Augustine.

Penitents of Our Lady of Refuge
Also called Nuns or Hospitallers of Our Lady of Nancy, founded at Nancy in 1631 by Venerable Marie-Elizabeth de la Croix de Jésus, daughter of Jean-Leonard de Fanfain of Remiremont. Left a widow at the early age of twenty-four, she opened a refuge for fallen women, assisted by her three young daughters. The new congregation was formally approved by the Holy See in 1634 under the title of Our Lady of Refuge and the patronage of St. Ignatius Loyola under constitutions drawn largely from those of the Society of Jesus and in accordance with the Rule of St. Augustine.

Sisters of the Conservatorio di S. Croce della Penitenza or del buon Pastore
Also known as Scalette, founded at Rome in 1615 by the Carmelite Domenico di Gesu e Maria, who, with the assistance of Baltassare Paluzzi, gathered into a small house (conservatorio) a number of women who were in danger of falling into prostitution. Those desiring to become religious were placed under the Rule of St. Augustine

Ordo religiosus de penitentia
Members being called Scalzette or Nazareni, the order was founded in 1752 at Salamanca, by Juan Varella y Losada (b. 1724; d. at Ferrara, 24 May 1769), who had resigned a military career for a life of voluntary humiliation in a house of the Observants at Salamanca. Being urged to found a religious order, he assembled eight companions in community (8 March 1752) under a rule which he had drawn up the previous year and for which he obtained the authorization of Pope Benedict XIV. Like the Franciscans, the members take a vow to defend the doctrine of the Immaculate Conception and, like all other mendicant orders,derive their means of subsistence entirely from contributions and are forbidden the possession of landed property.

Order of Penitents established by Bernard of Marseille
The Order of Penitents was a religious order established by Bernard of Marseille about 1272 for the reception into the Roman Catholic Church of reformed courtesans. Noah Webster's Dictionary, 1828, under "penitent" affirmed "Order of penitents, a religious order established by one Bernard of Marseilles, about the year 1272, for the reception of reformed courtezans. The congregation of penitents at Paris, was founded with a similar view." The entry was repeated in Nuttall's Encyclopedia 1907. The confraternities of penitents of Marseille were traced to the end of the 15th century by A. E. Barnes.

Compare the Magdalen Asylums.

== See also ==
- Confraternity of penitents
- Penitent bands
