= Videniškiai =

- Village
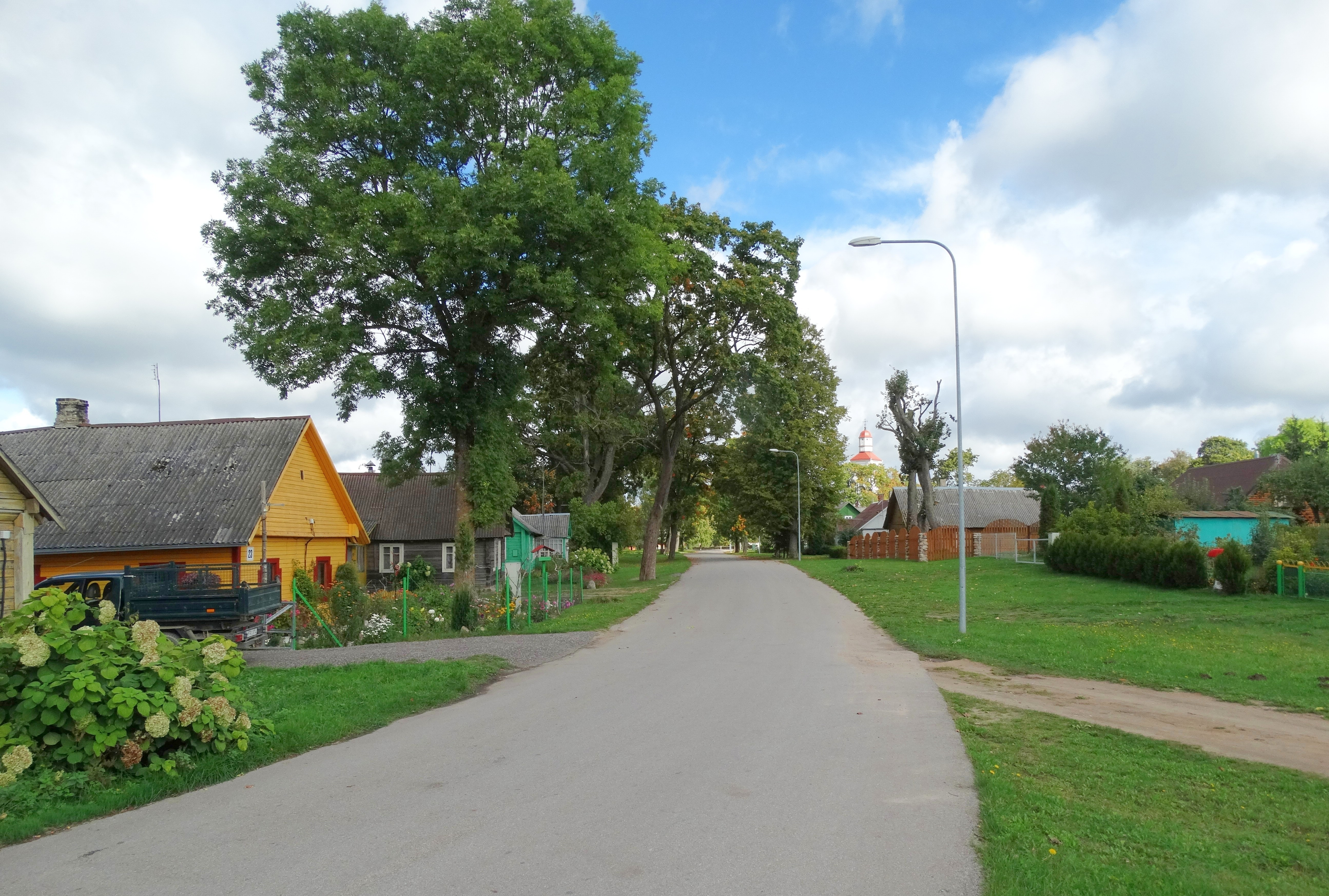
- Street in the village

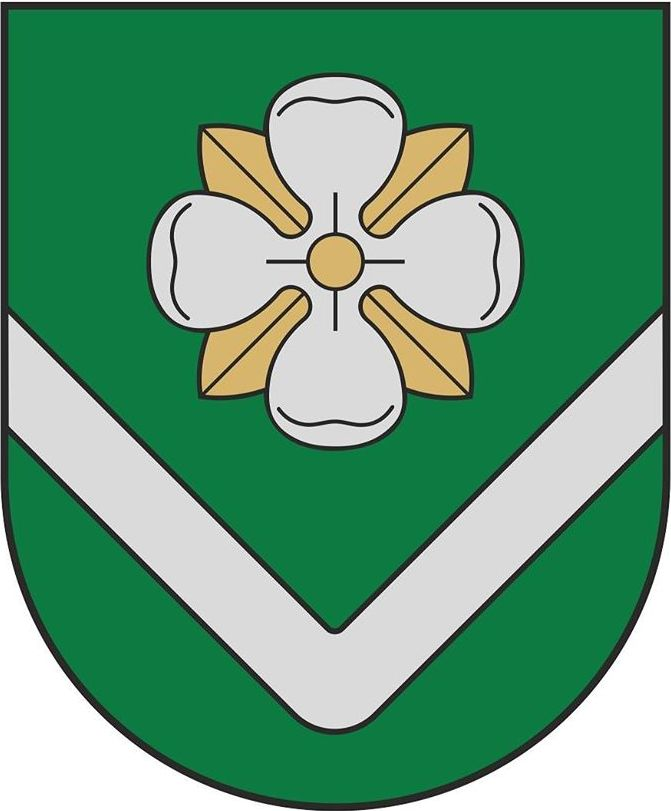
- Coat of arms

- Location of Videniškiai
- Coordinates: 55°13′00″N 25°16′40″E
- Country: Lithuania
- County: Utena County
- Municipality: Molėtai District Municipality
- Eldership: Videniškiai Eldership
- First mentioned: 1367

Population (2011)
  - Total: 368
- Time zone: UTC+2 (EET)
  - Summer (DST): UTC+3 (EEST)

Videniškiai is a historic village in the Molėtai District Municipality, Lithuania. It is located about 8 kilometres (5.0 mi) west of Molėtai. It is situated between the Ukmergė–Molėtai road and the Siesartis River. According to the 2011 census, it had 368 residents. In the 16th–17th centuries, the village was one of the core properties of the Giedroyć family who funded the monastery for the Canons Regular of Penitence of the Blessed Martyrs and the Church of St. Lawrence. The monastery honored Michał Giedroyć (died in 1485) who was possibly born in the village and was officially beatified in 2018. The reconstructed monastery now houses a small museum and a library.

== History ==
A bronze horseshoe-shaped fibula with red enamel was found during archaeological excavations at the center of the town in 1999. The fibula is dated to the 4th century AD. Its unique design was considered for the village's coat of arms.

According to the Palemonid legends, the village takes the name from its founder Duke Vidas (Hurda) Ginvilaitis, grandson of Duke Giedrius and ancestor of the Giedroyć family. The village was first mentioned in written sources in 1367 in a peace treaty of Grand Duke Algirdas and Duke Kęstutis with the Livonian Order. It guaranteed safe passage for merchants from Vilnius to Riga. The village was mentioned in the chronicle of Hermann von Wartberge in 1373 and 1375 when it was attacked during the Lithuanian Crusade.

Its coat of arms was approved by President Dalia Grybauskaitė on 28 August 2018. The coat of arms depict a four-leaf rose which alludes to the Poraj coat of arms used by the Giedroyć family. An inverted chevron represents architectural heritage and reminds of the letter "V" (the first letter of village's name). Its silver color represents the Siesartis river and the green shield represents the beauty of nature.

The village celebrates the traditional annual parish festival in June. It also hosts a two-week en plein air workshop for artists in July. The first event was organized in 2003.

== Demographics ==
The village had 239 residents in 1863, 255 in 1879, 284 in 1923, 282 in 1959, 268 in 1970, 316 in 1979, 403 in 1989, and 415 in 2001.

== Education ==
From the 17th century, the village had a school maintained by the church and monastery. The school had 20 students in 1770 and 48 students (11 nobles, 18 townspeople, and 19 peasants) in 1781. A year later, the number of students dropped to 17 (4 nobles, 7 townspeople, and 6 peasants). A small extension was added to the monastery in 1790 to house the school. In 1896, Žemaičių ir Lietuvos apžvalga reported that the village had a Russian primary school. In 1907, a new wooden school building was constructed. In 1949, the former monastery was transformed into a seven-year school. An extension was built in 1958 and the school relocated to a brand new building in 1971–1972. In 1966–1999, the school was a high school. At first reduced to a ten-year school, it became a branch of a primary school in Molėtai in 2013. The branch was closed in 2018. The renovated former school building will be used by a community center, library, and office of the eldership.

== Heritage ==
=== Castle ===
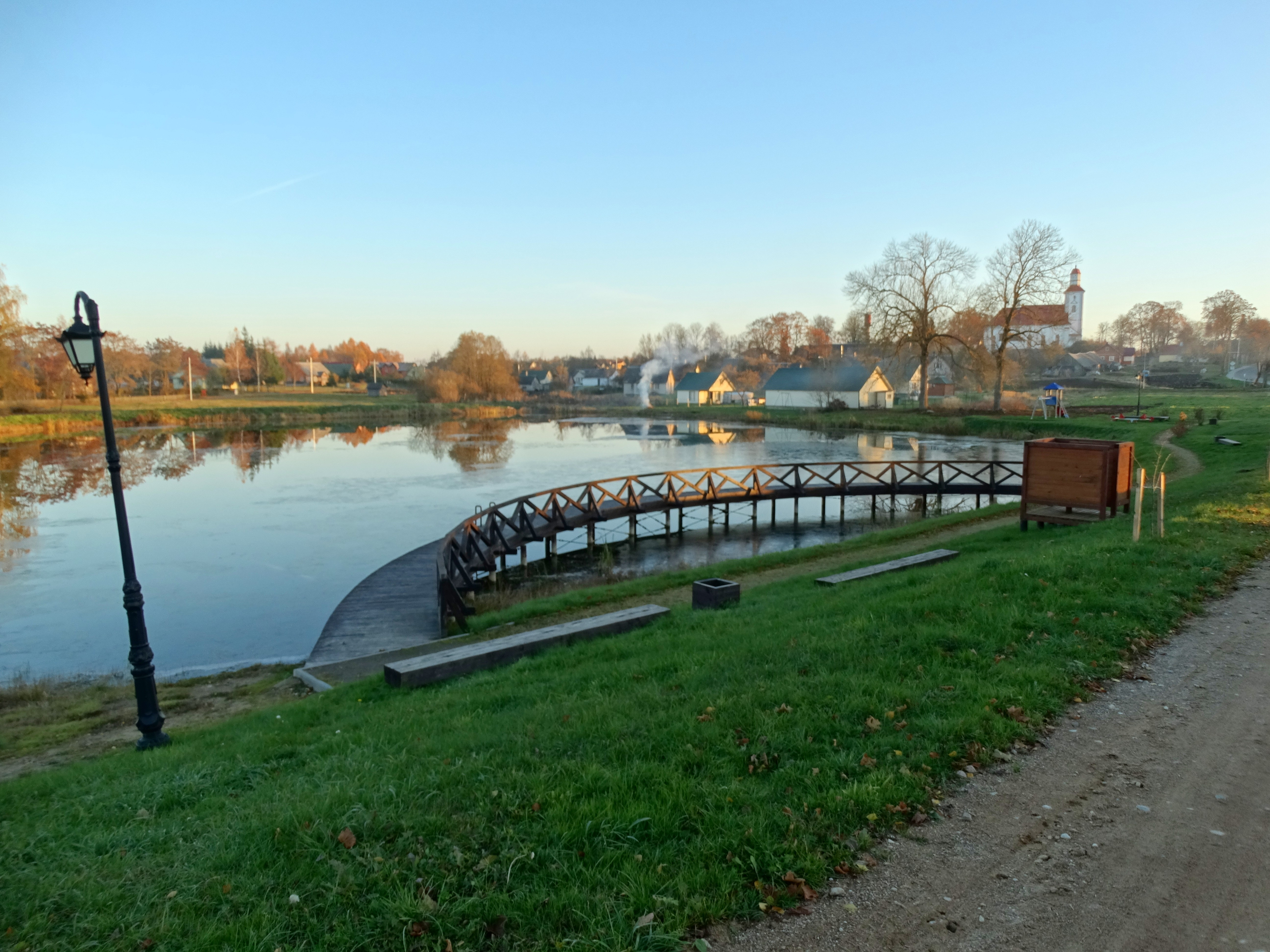
Videniškiai pond

According to a story recorded by Maciej Stryjkowski, Duke Daumantas (later confused with historical Daumantas of Pskov), son of Vidas from the legendary Palemonid dynasty, built a castle near Videniškiai. Historians attempted to identify it with the fortified Baltadvaris Castle located about 2 kilometres (1.2 mi) west of Videniškiai. However, archaeological excavations disproved the notion. It was likely built by Matas Giedraitis, Court Marshall of Lithuania, or his son Marcin, Voivode of Mstsislaw, in the mid-16th century. It was known as Mūriniai Videniškiai (Brick Videniškiai) and later as Baltadvaris (White Manor).

The castle was mortgaged to cover the family's debts in 1630. In mid-17th century, the castle lost its strategic importance and became a residential manor. Surviving descriptions mention the main residential building with a splendid "golden" hall and a Renaissance garden. However, the castle was increasingly neglected and gradually fell into ruins. It was gifted to the Congregation of the Mission based in Vilnius in 1695. The congregation did not turn the castle into a monastery, but used it to provide financial support to the monastery in Vilnius. Today, walls of the main castle barn and eastern gates, together with foundations and cellars, have survived.

=== Church and monastery ===
==== History ====
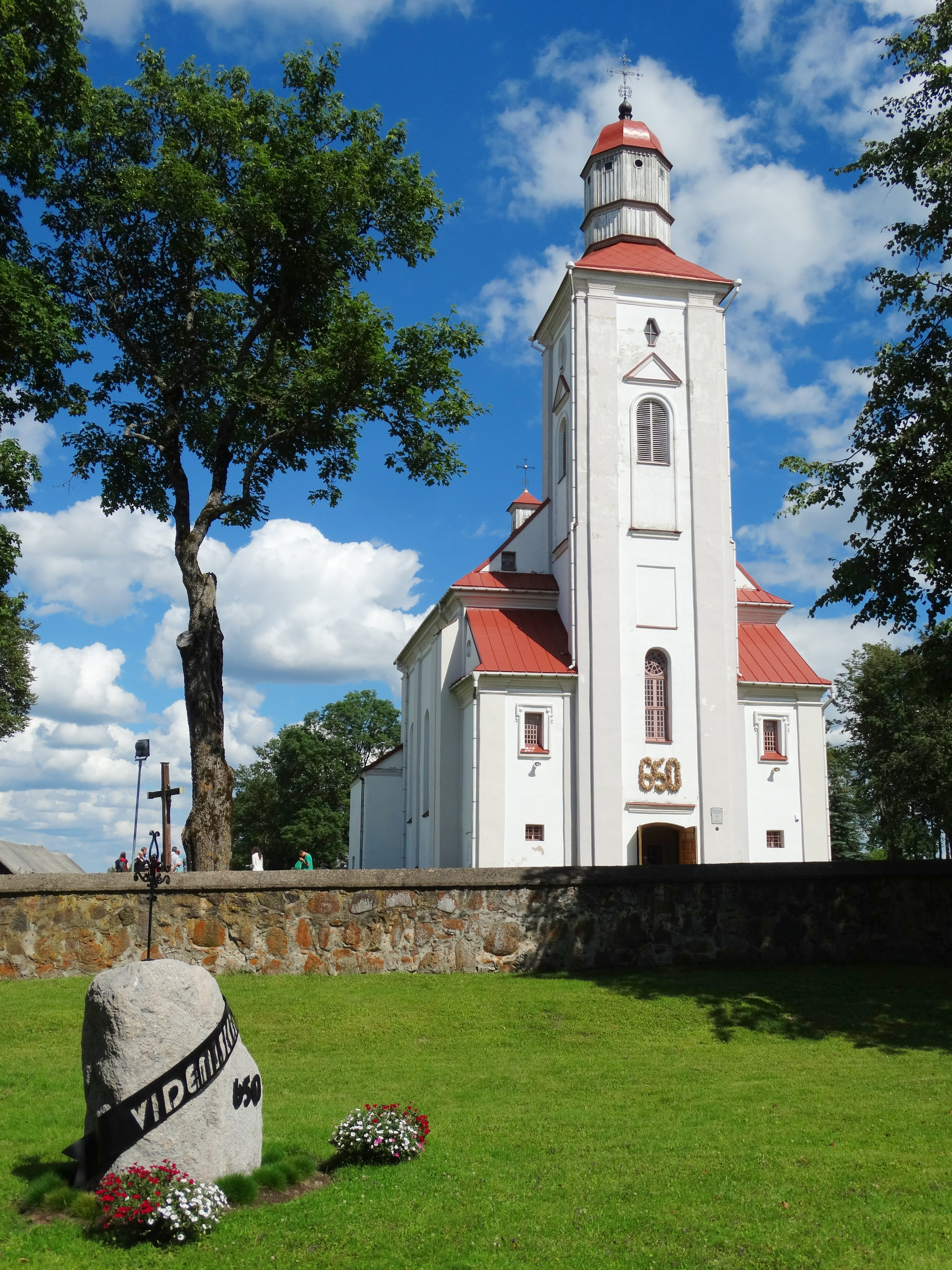
Church of Saint Lawrence and a memorial stone erected for the 650th anniversary of the village's founding

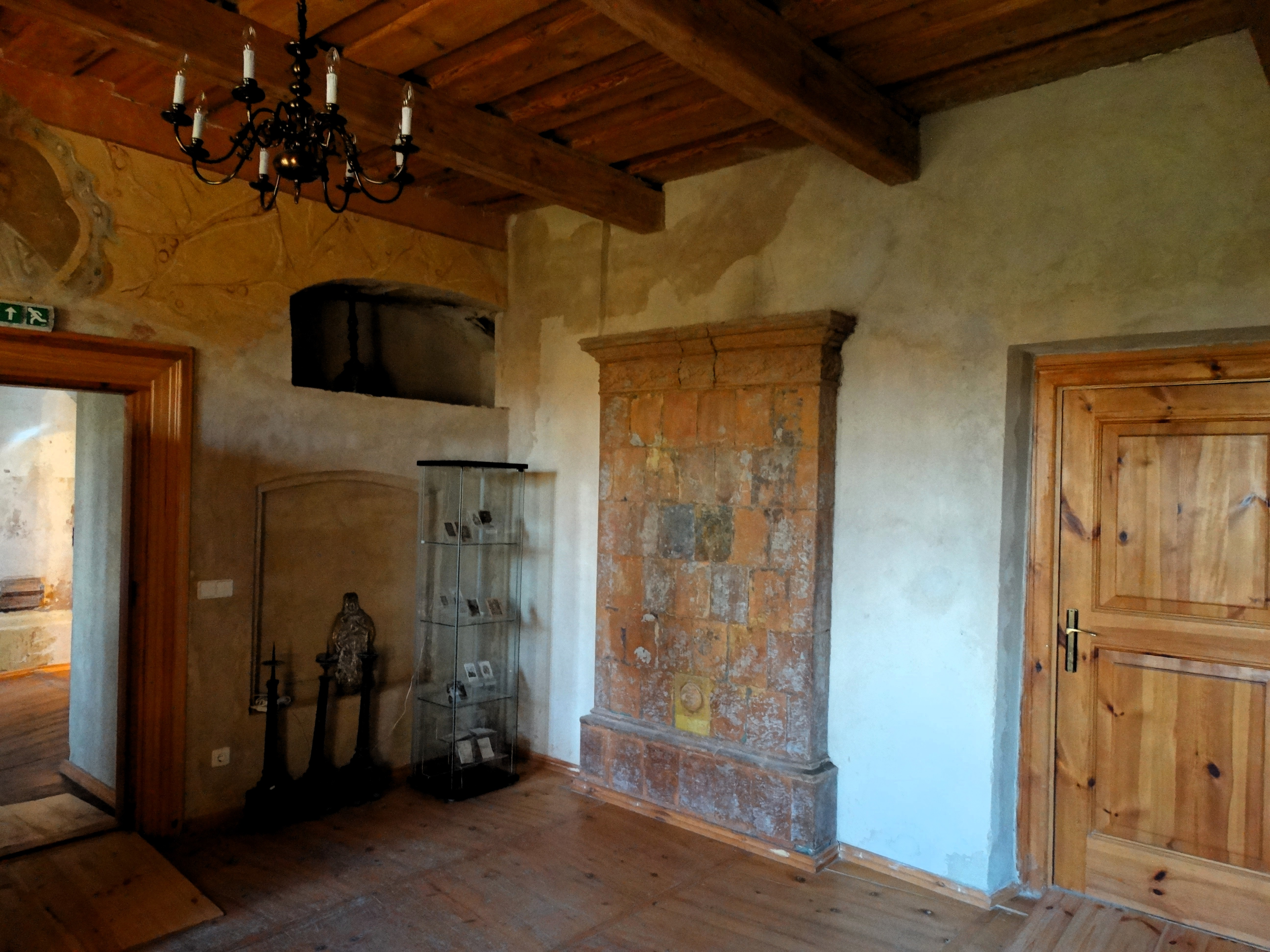
Interior of the former monastery

The first wooden church in Videniškiai was built by Matas Giedraitis in 1547–1549. The church was named after the Holy Trinity and was attended by priests from the Dominican Church of the Holy Spirit in Vilnius. His sons Marcin, Voivode of Mstsislaw, and Merkelis, Bishop of Samogitia, funded a new brick Church of St. Lawrence. Marcin also funded a monastery for the Canons Regular of Penitence of the Blessed Martyrs, an Augustinian order, which was completed in 1620. Michał Giedroyć (died 1485) was a member of the Canons Regular of Penitence and was venerated for his piousness (he was officially beatified only in 2018). The new monastery was financially supported by revenue from Videniškiai and other gifted land and serfs. A chapel with a crypt was added in 1631 to the monastery church to act as a mausoleum for the Giedroyć family.

The first monastery was a small wooden structure that could house twelve monks, but it became a center of the Canons Regular of Penitence in Lithuania. From the very beginning, monastery's superior had the right to wear bishop's insignia (mitre and crosier). The provincial superior and later superior general of the Canons Regular of Penitence was based in Videniškiai. The monastery had a novitiate and taught theology. In 1753, philosophy was taught by Michał Olszewski who also served as a vicar. That year he published a Lithuanian-language collection of sermons Broma atwerta ing wiecznasti... (The Gate Open to Eternity) which became very popular and was reprinted at least sixteen more times. The monastery also maintained a parish school (it possibly dates to 1600 when Merkelis Giedraitis left some sums for a school in his last will) and a rudimentary hospital/shelter for the sick and elderly (Lithuanian: špitolė). The church had a choir which owned a separate house in the village.

The church and the monastery were heavily damaged during the Second Northern War (1655–1660). The church was reconsecrated in 1684. In 1750s, two-floor brick monastery building was added. It survives this day. The old wooden monastery buildings continued to house novitiate, refectory, kitchen. They were demolished in mid-19th century. In 1783, Józef Kossakowski, Bishop of Livonia, received a papal bull from Pope Pius VI and seized the monastery and its land. Bishop of Vilnius Ignacy Jakub Massalski and the Canons Regular of Penitence sued and recovered the monastery and received cash compensation, but lost the land. After the Uprising of 1831, Tsarist authorities closed all monasteries (except one in Vilnius) of the Canons Regular of Penitence in 1832.

The monastery church became a parish church. The former monastery was used as a clergy house and, after World War II, as a school. After Lithuania declared independence, the damaged and neglected building was returned to the parish. Extensive restoration works started in 1994 with financial support by, among others, Michal Giedroyc, a descendant of the Giedroyć family. During the restoration, workers uncovered murals with portraits of monastery superiors. Originally, there were ten murals created c. 1762, but two were lost. After the prolonged restoration, a museum was opened in the former monastery on 4 May 2015 (the 530th death anniversary of Michał Giedroyć). The museum hosts educational workshops, including on candle and Christmas wafer making. The church holds a special mass in honor of Michał Giedroyć on the 4th day of every month.

==== Architecture ====
The exterior of the church and monastery are reserved, without decorations. The church presbytery has two epitaphs with relief figures that were installed in 1639. The figures are usually identified with the monastery founder Marcin Giedrojć and the first monastery superior Hippolit Rzepnicki, but it is possible that the second epitaph depicts Merkelis Giedraitis. The original early 18th-century church pipe organ has not survived. It was reworked by Wacław Biernacki in the early 20th century but has retained the original casing which is one of the older surviving casings in Lithuania. The organ has five stops.
