= Salakas =

- Town
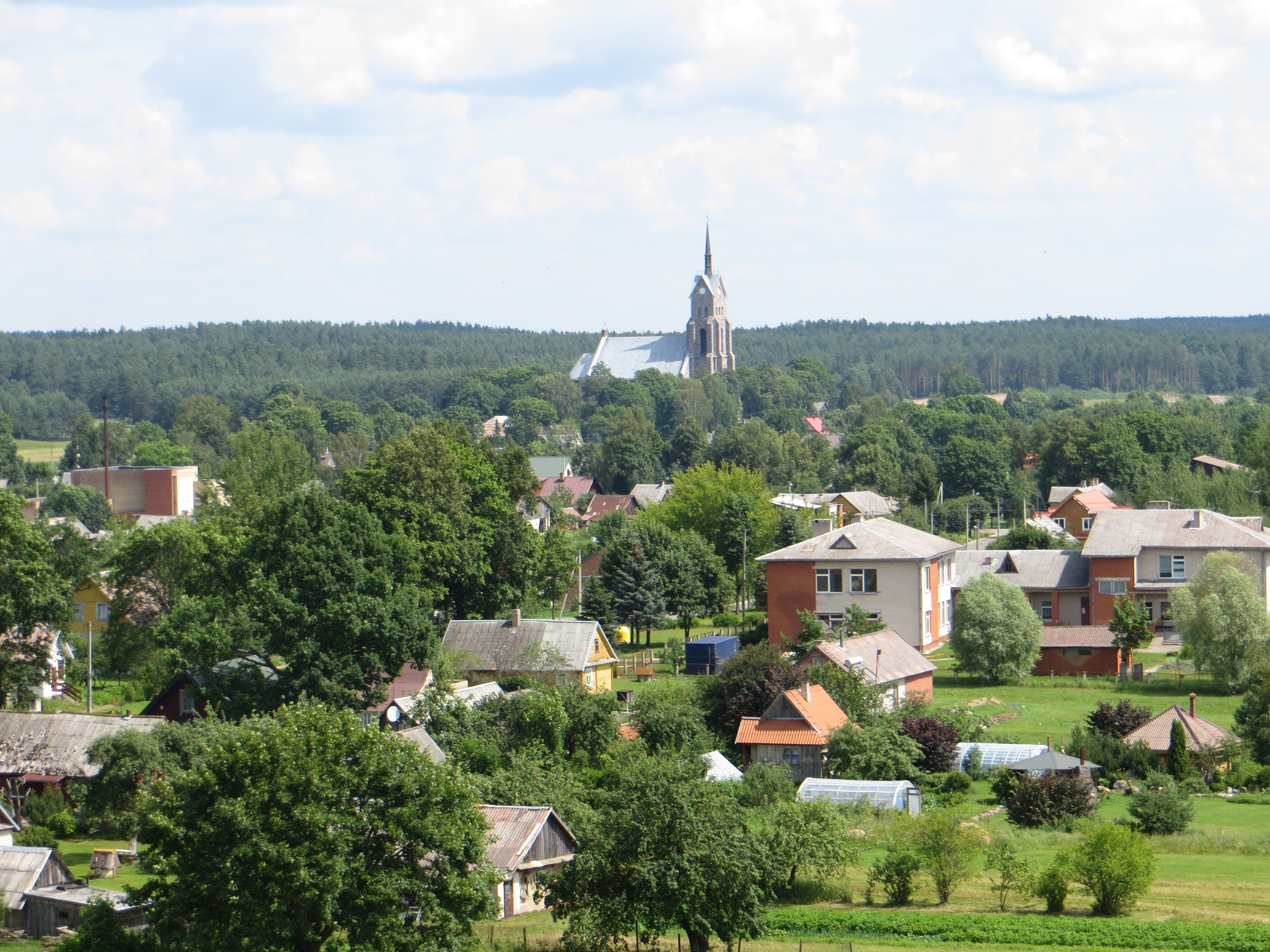
- Panorama of Salakas

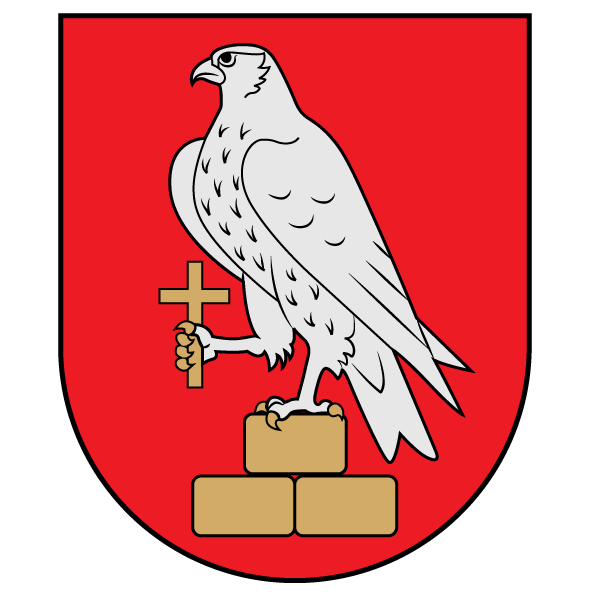
- Coat of arms

- Location within Lithuania
- Coordinates: 55°34′40″N 26°08′00″E
- Country: Lithuania
- County: Utena County
- Municipality: Zarasai District Municipality

Population (2011)
  - Total: 519
- Time zone: UTC+2 (EET)
  - Summer (DST): UTC+3 (EEST)

Salakas is a town in northeastern Lithuania with a population of 519 inhabitants according to the 2011 census. It is famous for the neo-romantic church of Lady of Sorrows. It was built in 1911.

== History ==
The settlement of Salakas was first mentioned in written sources in 1496 when a local noble gifted some land with three serfs to the parish church in Salakas and in 1497 when Wojciech Tabor, Bishop of Vilnius, gifted some land to a governor of Salakas.

In 1554 the town is mentioned as one of the towns on the main trade route from Vilnius to Riga. Because of this Salakas developed as a trading town. Around 1720, a monastery of the Canons Regular of the Penitence of the Blessed Martyrs was built, a wooden church was attached in 1740. After the failed Uprising of 1831, the monastery was closed by the Tsarist authorities in 1832.

Beginning in the early 19th century, there was a significant Jewish population in Salakas because of its status as a trading town. The percentage of Jewish inhabitants ranged from thirty percent to above fifty percent. At the end of August 1941, about 150 Jews from the town – men, women and children – were murdered during the Holocaust in the nearby forest of Sungardai.

After the Polish–Lithuanian War, the Lithuania–Poland border was located several kilometres from Salakas. This meant that the trade going through the town dried up.
