= Bystrytsa =

Bystrytsa (Belarusian: Быстрыца, romanized: Bystryca; Russian: Быстрица, romanized: Bystritsa) may refer to the following places in Belarus:

- Bystrytsa, Astravyets district, a village in Astravyets district, Grodno region
- Bystrytsa, Kapyl district, an agrotown in Kapyl district, Minsk region
- Bystrytsa, Kobryn district, a village in Kobryn district, Brest region
- Bystrytsa, Polotsk district, an agrotown in Polotsk district, Vitebsk region
- Bystrytsa, Mstsislaw district, a village in Mstsislaw district, Mogilev region
