= Michał Olszewski (priest) =

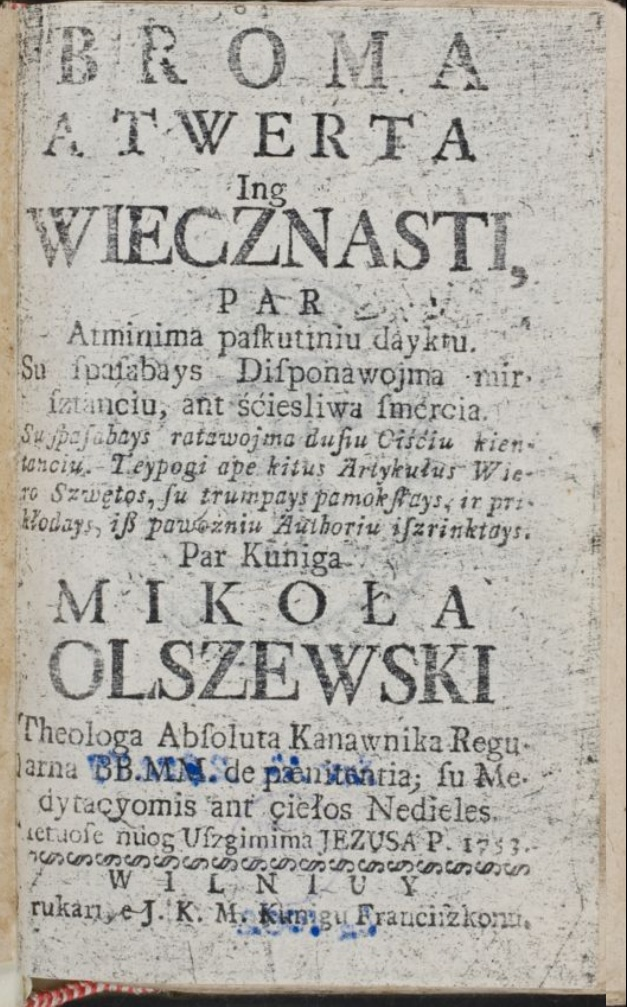
Title page of a Mykolas Olševskis' book named BROMA ATWERTA Ing WIECZNASTI (in Lithuanian language), published in Vilnius, Grand Duchy of Lithuania, 1753.

Michał Olszewski (Lithuanian: Mykolas Olševskis also Ališauskis, Alšauskis, Olšauskis; c. 1712 – c. 1779) was a Lithuanian Roman Catholic priest and a member of the Canons Regular of the Penitence of the Blessed Martyrs from the Grand Duchy of Lithuania. In 1753, he published a Lithuanian language collection of religious readings Broma atwerta ing wiecznastį... (The Gate Open to Eternity) which became very popular and over the next hundred years was reprinted at least sixteen more times. Despite its popularity, Broma was criticized both for its naive content and impure language full of loanwords and barbarisms.

== Biography ==
Very little is known about Olszewski's life in part because his order prohibited to publicize one's work. He was likely born around 1712 in the district of Raseiniai and joined the Canons Regular of the Penitence of the Blessed Martyrs, an Augustinian order, as a young man. He spent three years at the monastery in Videniškiai and studied moral and systematic theology in Michališki for four years. He then served as a pastor in Varniany, Šešuoliai, Videniškiai. From 1755 to at least 1761, he was visitator of the Canons Regular of the Penitence in the Polish–Lithuanian Commonwealth. In 1761, he obtained both a licentiate and a doctorate in theology from Vilnius University. He then taught at the monastery of Canons Regular of the Penitence in Užupis, Vilnius. He died around 1779.

== Broma ==
=== Content ===
Broma atwerta ing wiecznastį... (The Gate Open to Eternity; modern Lithuanian: Vartai, atverti į amžinybę) was first published in 1753. It was not a liturgical text, but a collection of various religious readings for the commoners. It combines abstract theoretical texts (with some elements of medieval Scholasticism) with lively examples and illustrations laden with Christian mysticism. It contains various readings (sermons, didactic stories, prayers, scenes from the lives of saints, etc.) related to death, heaven and hell, and the eternal life. Many episodes and scenes were borrowed from various medieval Spanish and Italian authors. Overall, the text promotes asceticism – earthly desires are sinful and life is but a short period to prepare for the eternal life. For example, the book presents Francis Xavier as a role model because he prepared to die every hour. Various texts blend reality with the spiritual realm. People, both dead and alive, are as real as devils and angels and can interact with each other and visit earth, heaven, and hell. Fictionalized stories had dialogues, scenes from everyday life, deals with the devil, often unexpected conclusions. These elements made the stories similar to fables or fairy tales and made the book very popular among the readers.

It is an example of Baroque literature and as such features complex style (extensive use of various figures of speech, including comparisons, contrasts, antithesis, metaphors, hyperboles, paradoxes, etc.). The title itself is a metaphor of death (i.e. death is the gate that leads to eternity). The language blends Lithuanian with numerous Latin quotes from the Bible (which are then paraphrased in Lithuanian) and numerous loanwords and barbarisms mainly from Polish, but also other Slavic languages and German. Such macaronic language was likely impressive and astonishing to the poorly educated average reader, and was common in other Baroque literature. About half of the lexicon are loanwords and barbarisms, or about 27% if disregarding Latin words and loanwords that are still widely used in standard Lithuanian. The first edition tried to maintain the middle literary language, i.e. a blend of Aukštaitian and Samogitian dialects. Later editions became increasingly more Samogitian.

=== Reception ===
Broma became very popular and was frequently reprinted. In total, seventeen editions are known from 1753, 1759, 1764, 1766, 1777, 1779, 1785, 1789, 1793, 1795, 1799, 1806, 1811, 1824, 1846, 1847, and 1851. The first edition was published by the Franciscan press in Vilnius. Most later editions were printed by the press of Vilnius University. The 1777 edition was edited and shortened; it served as the basis for further reprints. Another edition was planned in 1864, but Bishop of Samogitia Motiejus Valančius did not give it the approbation as it contained "invented stories" that "encouraged superstition". Despite the Lithuanian press ban which prohibited the publication of Lithuanian-language texts in the Russian Empire, Valančius undertook to revise and correct Broma. He corrected the language, made didactic stories more earthly and relevant (e.g. by providing a date and time when they took place), etc. Valančius revised it in 1874–1875, but he died before the revised work could published. There were aborted plans to publish the revised Broma by priest Juozas Tumas in 1904. Broma was republished in 2015 – priest Edmundas Naujokaitis modernized its language and added commentaries and intended it for the general public.

The book was criticized for its content. The first known criticism is by Lutheran priests from East Prussia, Christian Gottlieb Mielcke in 1800 and August Gotthilf Krause in 1834. In an unpublished manuscript from 1841, Catholic priest Liudvikas Adomas Jucevičius expressed the oft-quoted opinion that the book should have been burned long ago due to its "meaningless ramblings". In the 20th century, linguists focused on the impurities of language. Zigmas Zinkevičius cited it as the best example of the decline of the printed Lithuanian under the pressure of Polonization in the 18th century. Due to the ideology of the anti-Catholicism in the Soviet Union, Soviet literary historians attacked Broma and its religious content which "inflicted considerable harm to Lithuanian culture, folklore and the development of the Lithuanian language." Researcher Mikas Vaicekauskas proposed to reconsider the book as a valuable example of late Baroque literature which reflected the era's worldview, culture, and language.

== Other works ==
In addition to Broma, Olszewski wrote four other works.

Polish-language Miasto uspokojenia serc ludzkich (A City of Calming Human Hearts) was finished in 1753 and published in 1755. It is an almost 600-page collection of meditations for each day of the year. Each day has three texts – about the Bible, Mary, mother of Jesus, and various saints with scenes and examples from their lives.

Polish-language Kazanie na dzień wszystkich świętych (Sermon for the All Saints' Day) was published in 1753. It is a 16-page (octavo) booklet in honor of Aleksander Andrzej Rymowicz (Aleksandras Andrius Rymavičius) who became the new superior of the Canons Regular of the Penitence and who supported Olszewski's works and helped with their publication. Another short Polish sermon, Kazanie otwarte na fest SS. Apostołów Piotra i Pawła (Public Sermon for the Feast of Saints Peter and Paul the Apostles), was published in 1756.

His Lithuanian-language Historia święta trumpay surinkta (1765) has not survived and is known only from notes by the 19th-century bibliographer Jurgis Pliateris.
