= Suvainiškis =

- Town
- Location within Lithuania
- Coordinates: 56°09′10″N 25°16′50″E
- Country: Lithuania
- County: Panevėžys County

Population (2011)
  - Total: 175
- Time zone: UTC+2 (EET)
  - Summer (DST): UTC+3 (EEST)

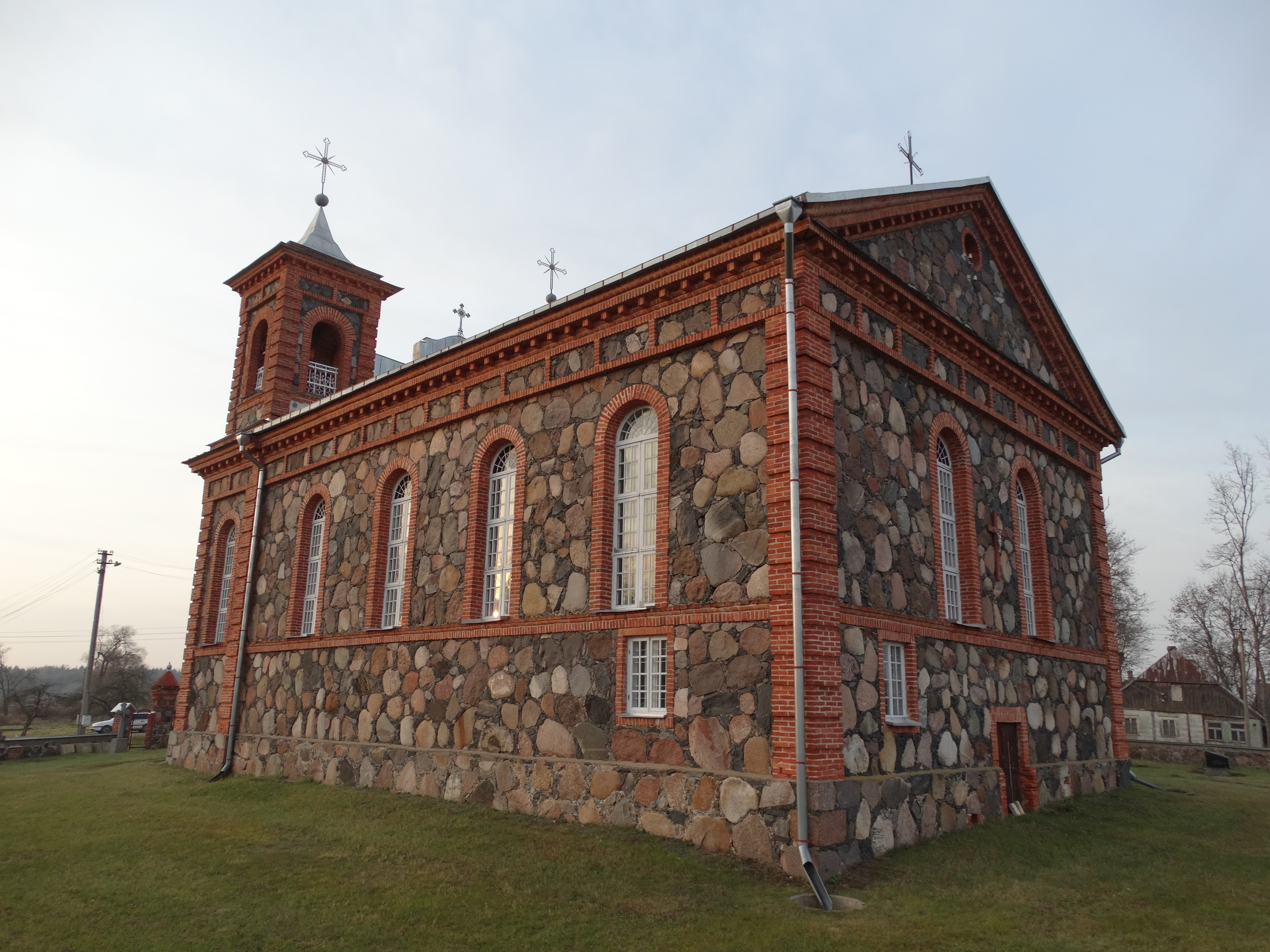
Roman Catholic Church in Suvainiškis, Rokiškis district, Lithuania

Suvainiškis is a small town in Panevėžys County, in northeastern Lithuania. According to the 2011 census, the town had a population of 175 people.
