= Church of St. Bartholomew, Vilnius =

Roman Catholic church in Vilnius, Lithuania built in 1824

Church of St. Bartholomew Šv. apaštalo Baltramiejaus bažnyčia
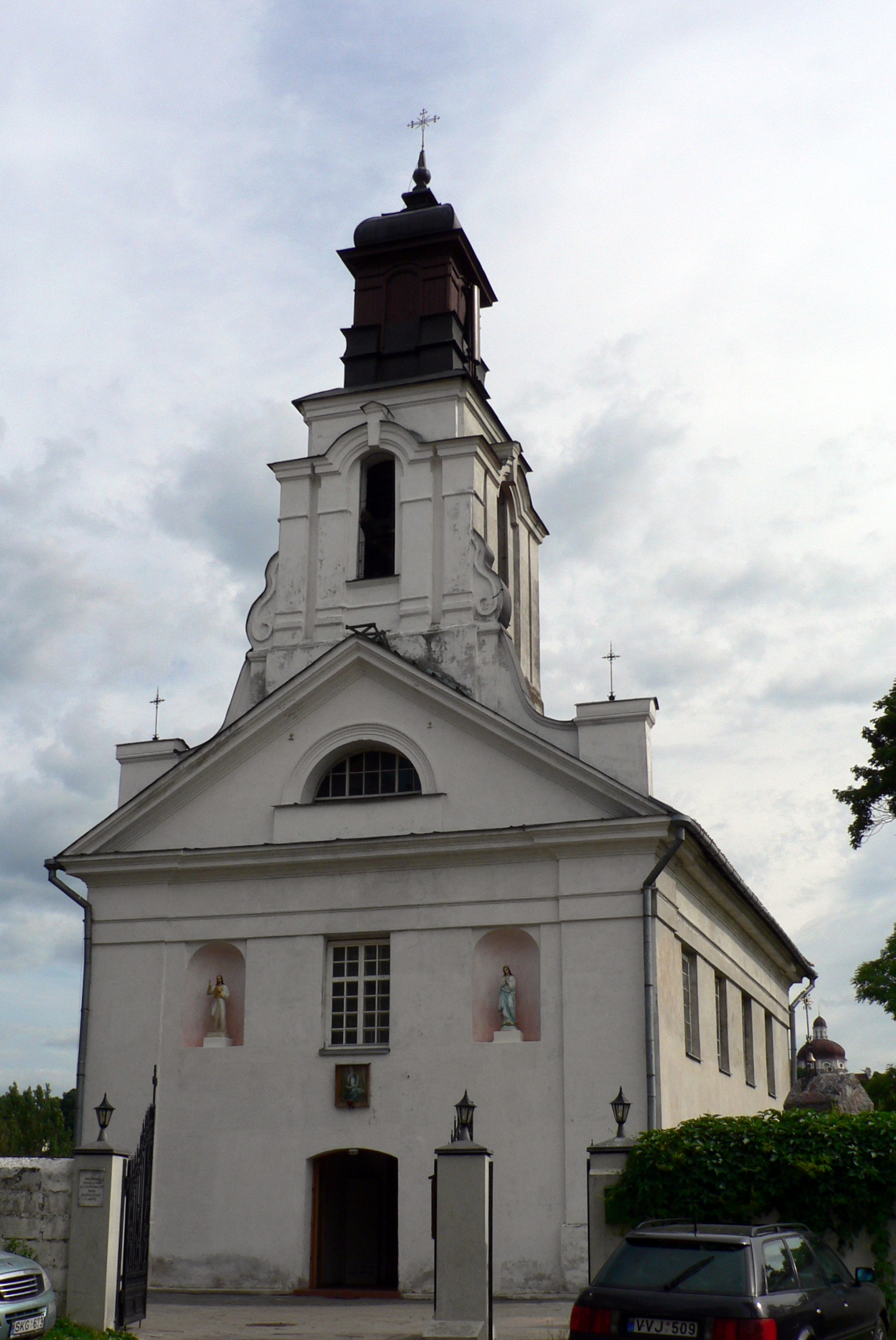
- Façade of the church in 2005

Religion
- Affiliation: Roman Catholic
- Diocese: Užupis
- Ecclesiastical or organizational status: Used as a church
- Leadership: Roman Catholic Archdiocese of Vilnius

Location
- Location: Vilnius, Lithuania
- Interactive map of Church of St. Bartholomew; Šv. apaštalo Baltramiejaus bažnyčia
- Coordinates: 54°40′49.01″N 25°17′51.26″E

Architecture
- Type: Church
- Style: Classicism
- Completed: 1824
- Materials: Plastered masonry

Website
- https://baltramiejus.lt/

Church of St. Bartholomew (Lithuanian: Šv. apaštalo Baltramiejaus bažnyčia) is a Roman Catholic church in Užupis, Vilnius which was built in 1824. It is the only church in Vilnius where the masses are held in the Belarusian language. According to a 2011 census, 49.6% of Belarusians in Lithuania are of Roman Catholic faith.

== Gallery ==
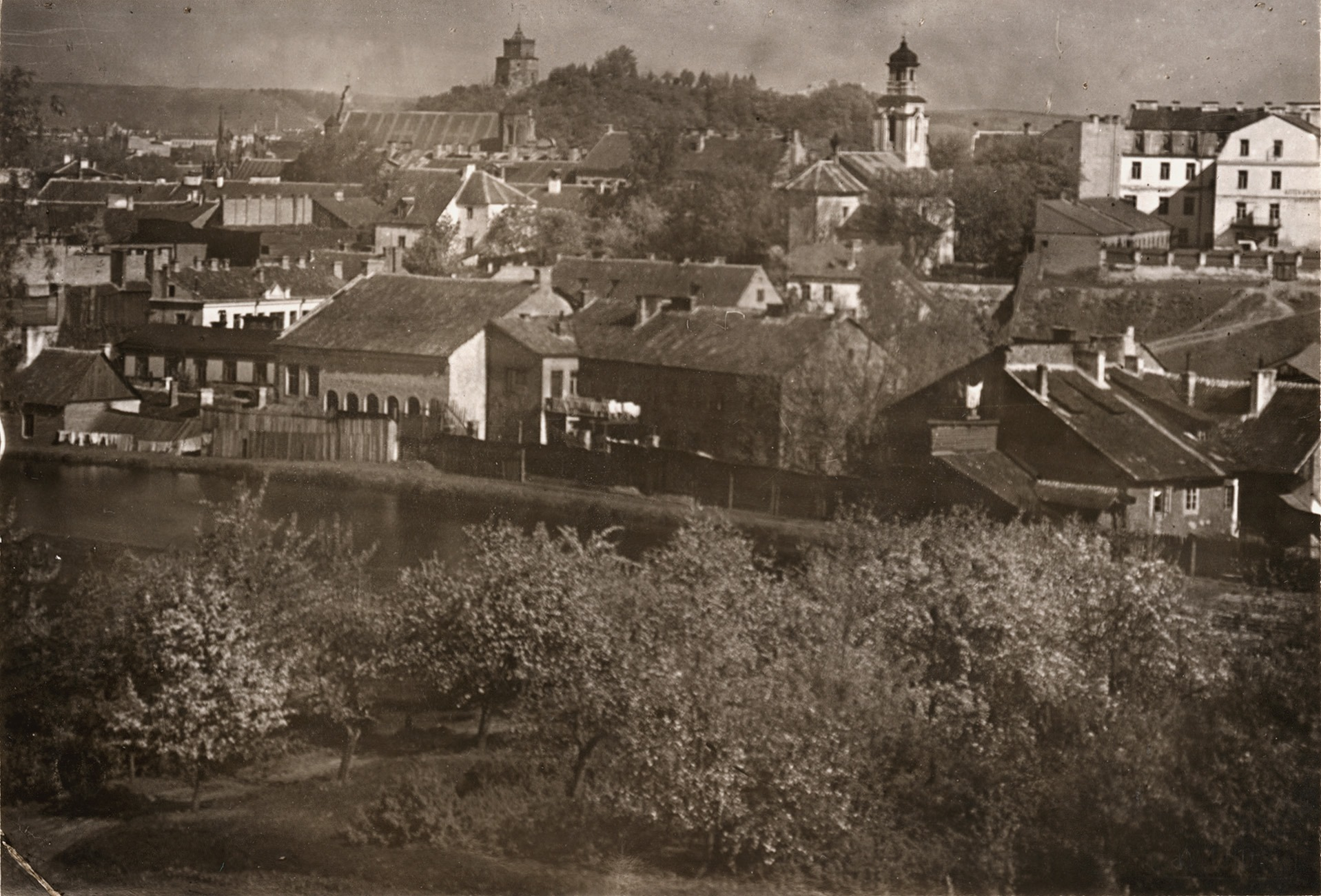
Church and its surroundings in 1919

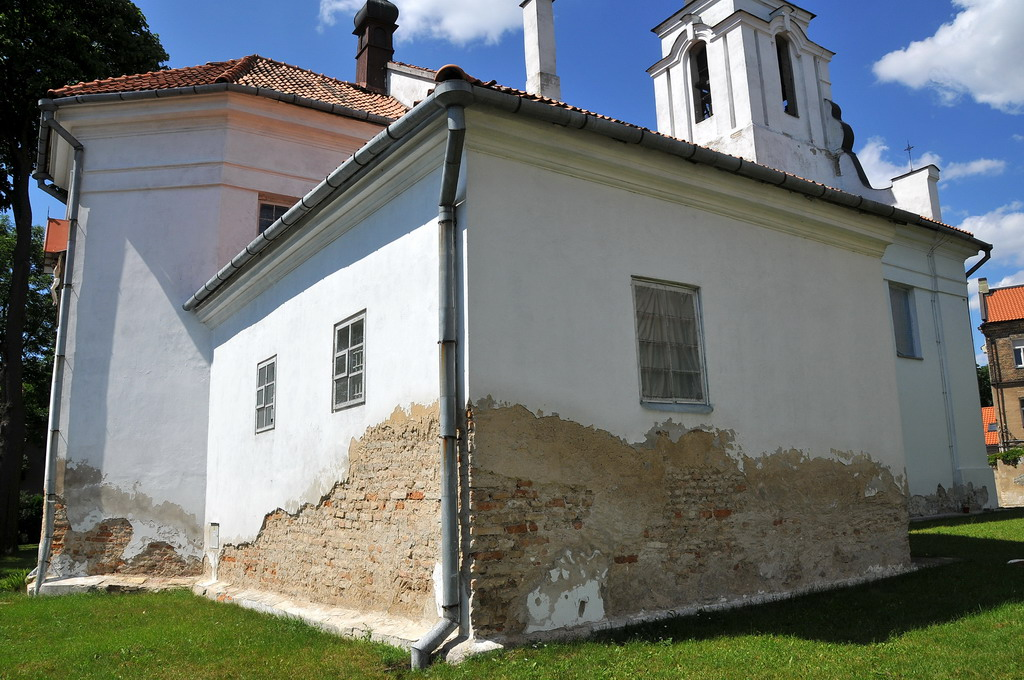
Side-view of the church in 2011

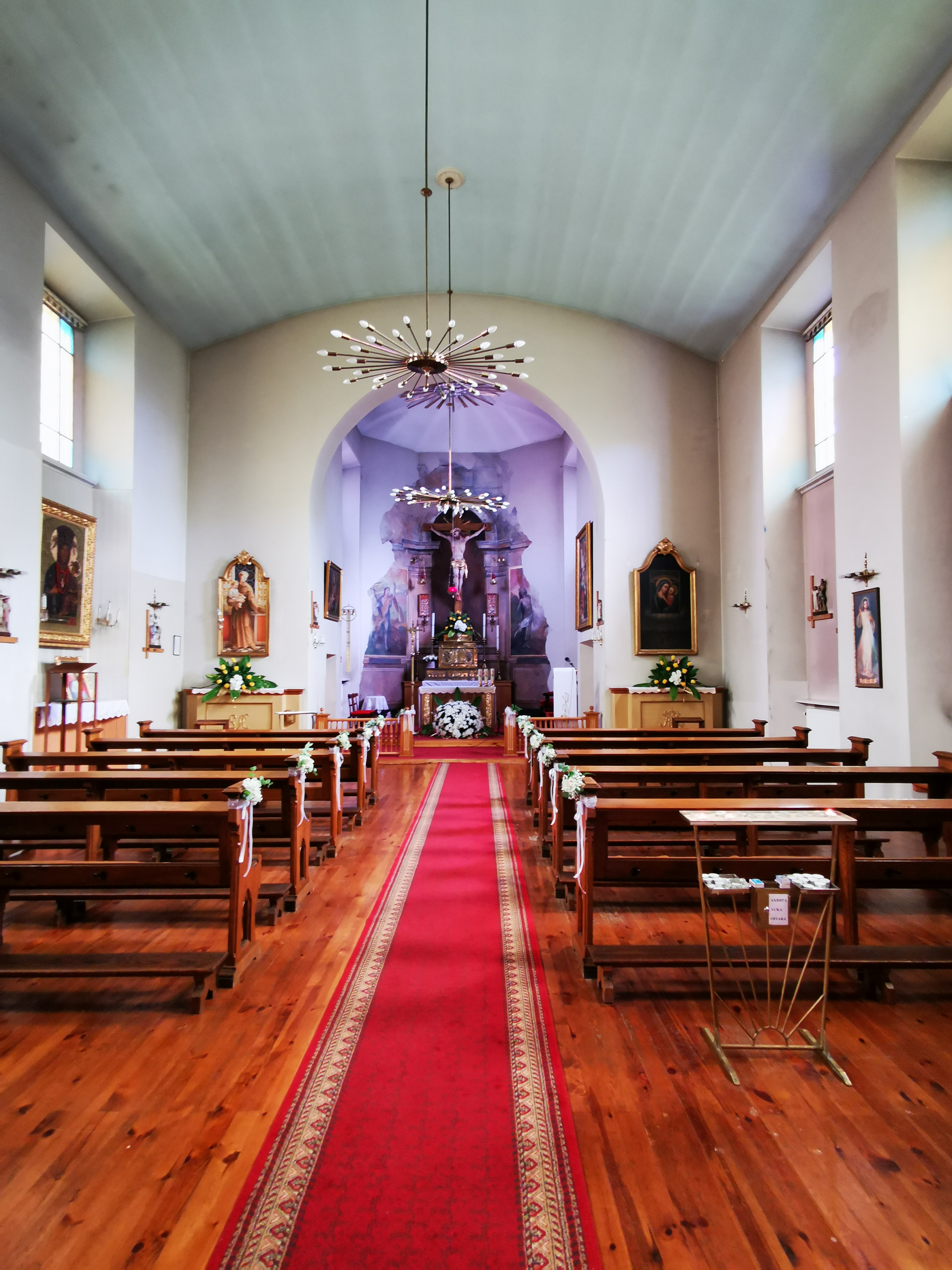
Interior of the church in 2020

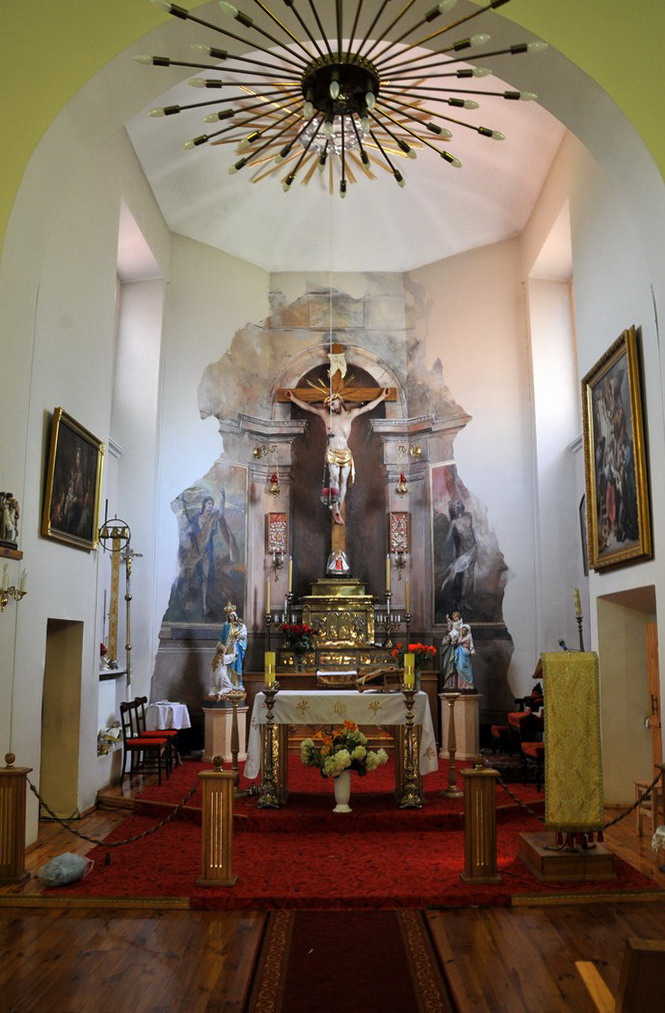
Main altar of the church in 2011
