= Judas Cyriacus =

Christian bishop and saint (d. ca. 360 AD)

Saint Cyriacus of Ancona (Judas Cyriacus)
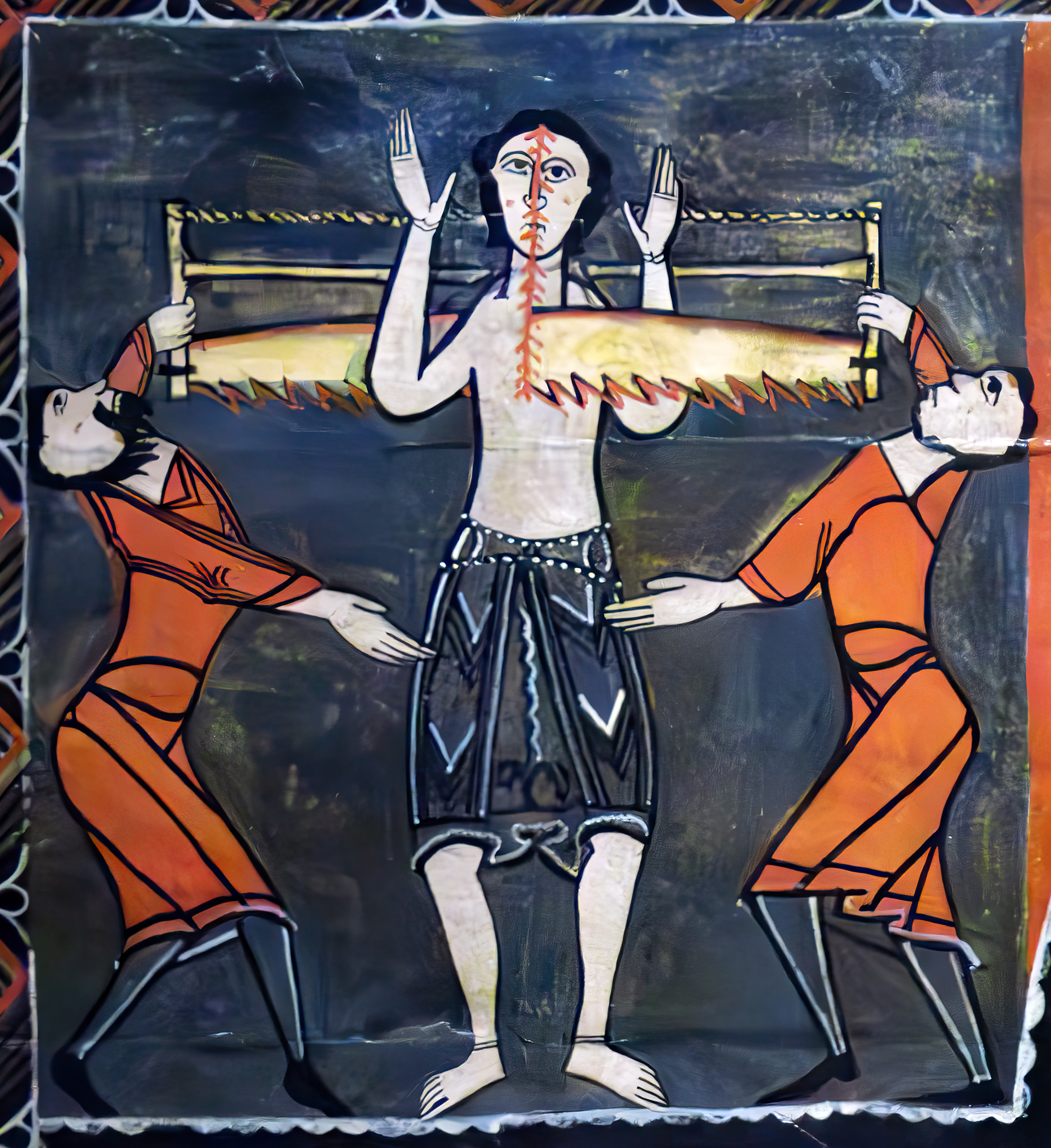
- Martyrdom of St. Quirico. Barcelona, 12th century

Martyr and Bishop of Ancona
- Died: ca. 360 AD
- Venerated in: Catholic Church, Eastern Orthodox Church
- Canonized: Pre-congregation
- Major shrine: Cathedral of San Ciriaco, Ancona, Italy
- Feast: 4 May (Catholic Church) 28 October (Eastern Orthodox Church)
- Patronage: Ancona, Italy

St. Judas Cyriacus (Cyriacus of Ancona, Cyriacus of Jerusalem, Quiriacus, Quiricus, Kyriakos); Spanish: Quirico, Italian: Ciriaco), d. ca. AD 360, is the patron saint of Ancona, Italy. His feast day is celebrated in the Catholic Church on 4 May.

== Judas Cyriacus, Bishop of Ancona ==
Judas Cyriacus was the bishop of Ancona who was killed during a pilgrimage to the Holy Land. His feast is celebrated in the Eastern Orthodox Church on 14 April.

(Judas Cyriacus of Ancona is often confused with the legendary Bishop Judah Kyriakos of Jerusalem (Saint Cyriacus of Jerusalem), who was killed during a disturbance there, in 133 AD. The 2nd century Bishop Judah Kyriakos of Jerusalem is said to be the last in desposynic line for that post, some of his predecessors being descendants from the family of Jesus.)

== Judas Cyriacus and the True Cross ==
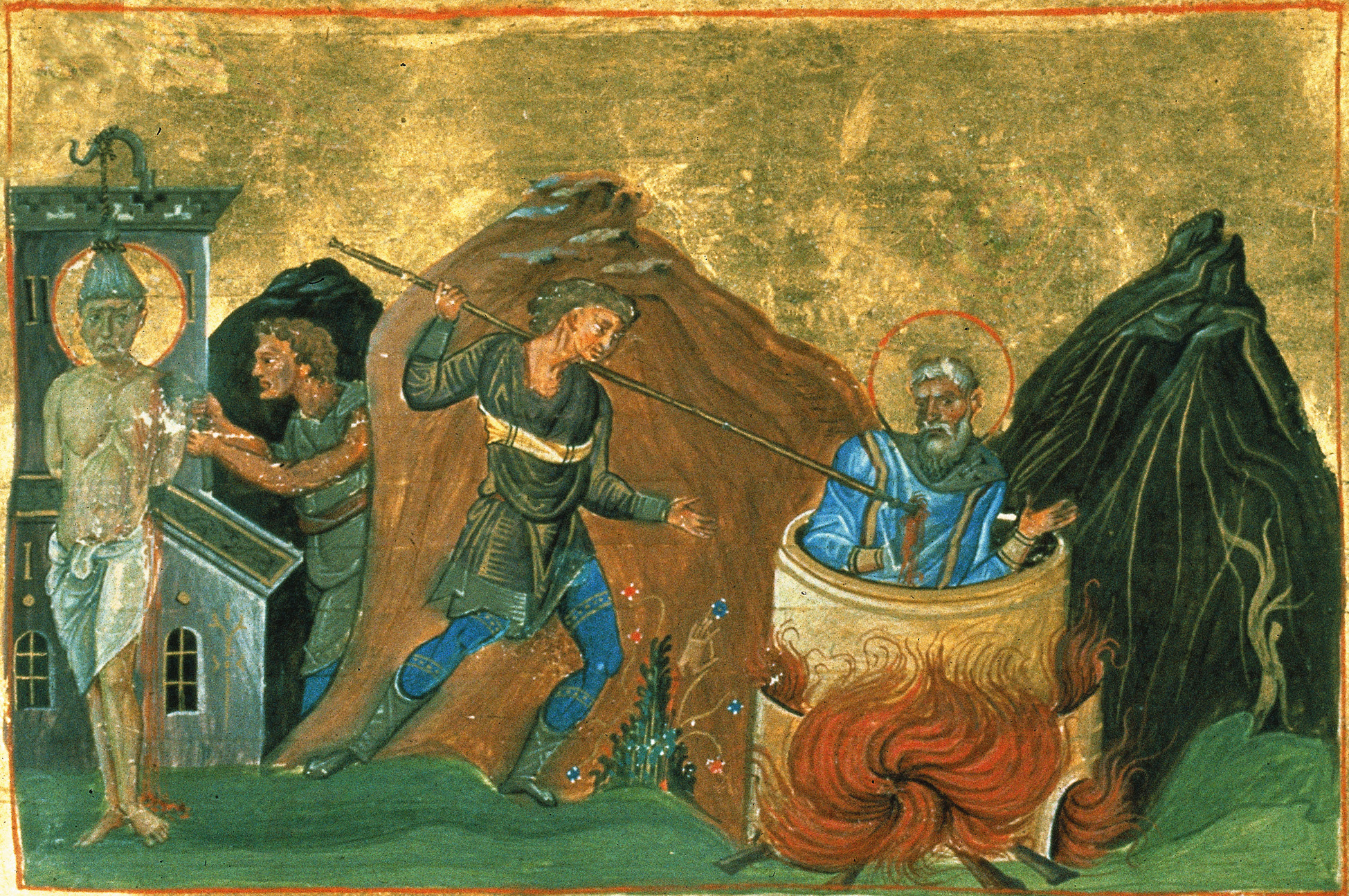
The martyrdom of Judas Cyriacus.

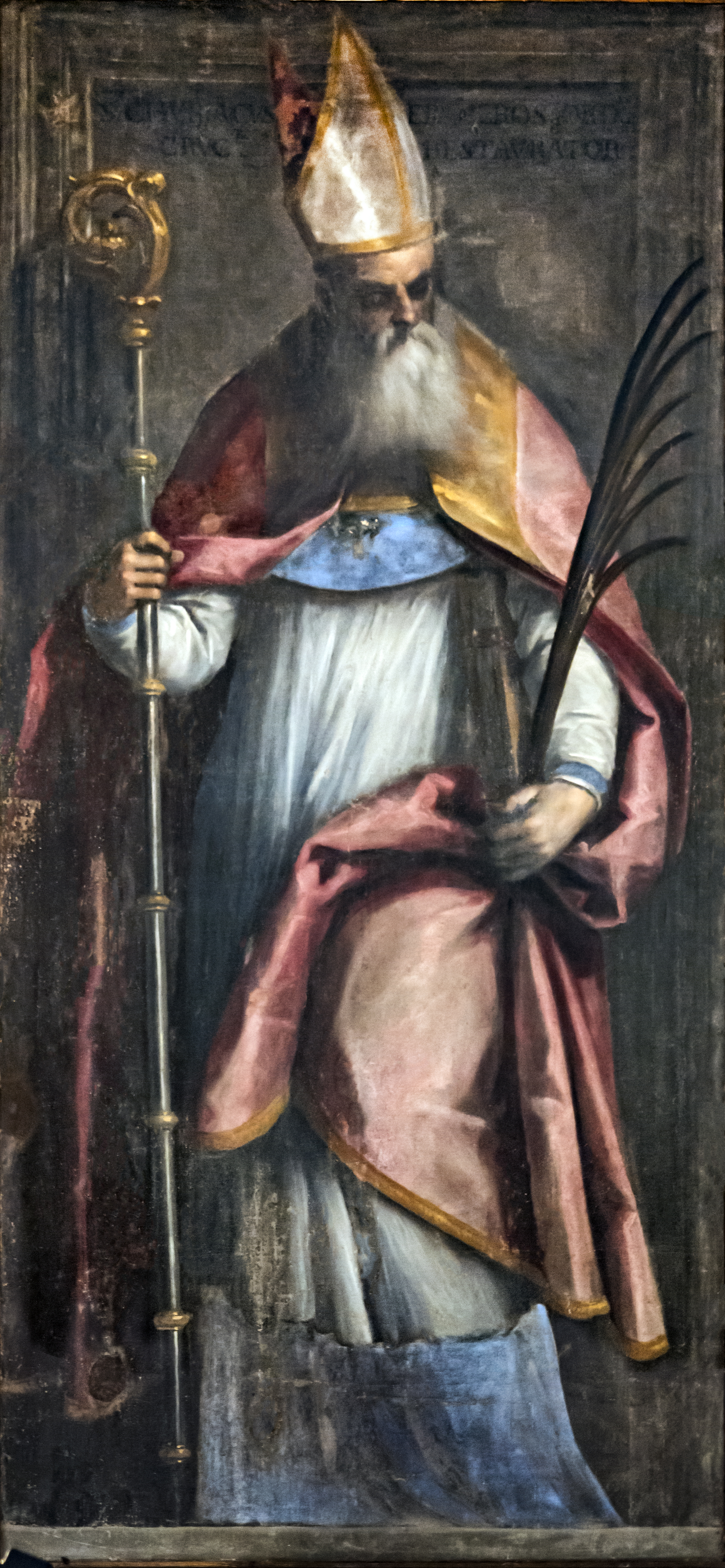
Judas Cyriacus by Palma il Giovane

The local tradition of Ancona has identified this saint with the Jew named Judas Quiriacus or Kyriakos.

According to legend, a Jew Judas Kyriakos aided the Empress Helena in finding the True Cross, which had been buried at Golgotha after the crucifixion. The oldest extant Syriac text of the legend of the discovery of the True Cross by Judas Kyriakos dates from c. 500 AD. Its recent editor and translator says that the manuscript is "of great value for the history of the legend of the inventio crucis".

Sozomen (died c. 450 AD), in his Ecclesiastical History states that it was said (by whom he does not say) that the location of the Holy Sepulchre was "disclosed by a Hebrew who dwelt in the East, and who derived his information from some documents which had come to him by paternal inheritance" (although Sozomen himself disputes this account) and that a dead person was also revived by the touch of the Cross. Later, popular versions of this story state that a Jew who assisted Helena was named Jude or Judas, but later converted to Christianity and took the name Kyriakos (kyriakos means "lordly" or "lord-like" in Greek).

Among the three accounts about the discovery of the True Cross that circulated throughout the Roman Empire in the 4th century, the two most widely repeated both credited Helena, the aged mother of Constantine the Great, who travelled to Jerusalem at her son's request. To recover it, it was necessary to demolish a temple, perhaps dedicated to Venus, that occupied the site. In one, Judas knew of the location of the Cross; he had been the recipient of that secret knowledge which was handed down the paternal line of his family, and revealed it under torture. As J. W. Drijvers, the editor of the text, has noted,

The story of Judas Kyriakos originated in Greek, but became also known in Latin and Syriac and later on in many vernacular languages. This version relates how Helena discovered the Cross with the help of a Jew named Judas, who later converted and received the name Kyriakos.

== The martyrdom of Judas Cyriacus ==
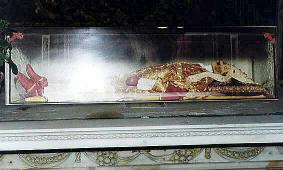
The body of Judas Cyriacus in the Cathedral of Ancona.

After assisting Helena with the finding of the True Cross, Judas Cyriacus was baptized, consecrated as bishop of Jerusalem, and martyred during the persecutions of Julian the Apostate, which would place his death in the 4th century. Another saint, named Saint Cyriacus, died during this century, and there may have been confusion between the two saints.

In the Acts of his martyrdom, at first written in Greek and then translated in Latin and Syriac, he engaged in dialogue with the emperor Julian and, along with his mother Anna, was described as being subjected to horrible torments. The Empress Galla Placidia is said to have presented Ancona with the relics of Judas Cyriacus. However, the saint's head was located at Provins. Henry I of Champagne brought it from Jerusalem and built a church in this town to contain it. This still stands as the Saint Quiriace Collegiate Church, although construction work during the 12th century was never completed due to financial difficulties during the reign of Philippe le Bel. A dome was added in the 17th century, and the old families of Provins who lived in the upper town were called "Children of the Dome."

== Cathedral of San Ciriaco ==
Monte Guasco, in Ancona, the location of the Duomo is dedicated to Saint Judas Cyriacus. It is said to occupy the site of a temple of Venus, who is mentioned by Catullus and Juvenal as the tutelary deity of the place.

It was consecrated in 1128 and completed in 1189. Some writers suppose that the original church was in the form of a Latin cross and belonged to the 8th century. An early restoration was completed in 1234. It is a fine Romanesque building in grey stone, built in the form of a Greek cross, with a dodecagonal dome over the center slightly altered by Margaritone d'Arezzo in 1270.

The body of Cyriacus lies prostrate and visible in his tomb.

== See also ==
- Saint Judas Cyriacus, patron saint archive
