= Jūžintai =

- Town
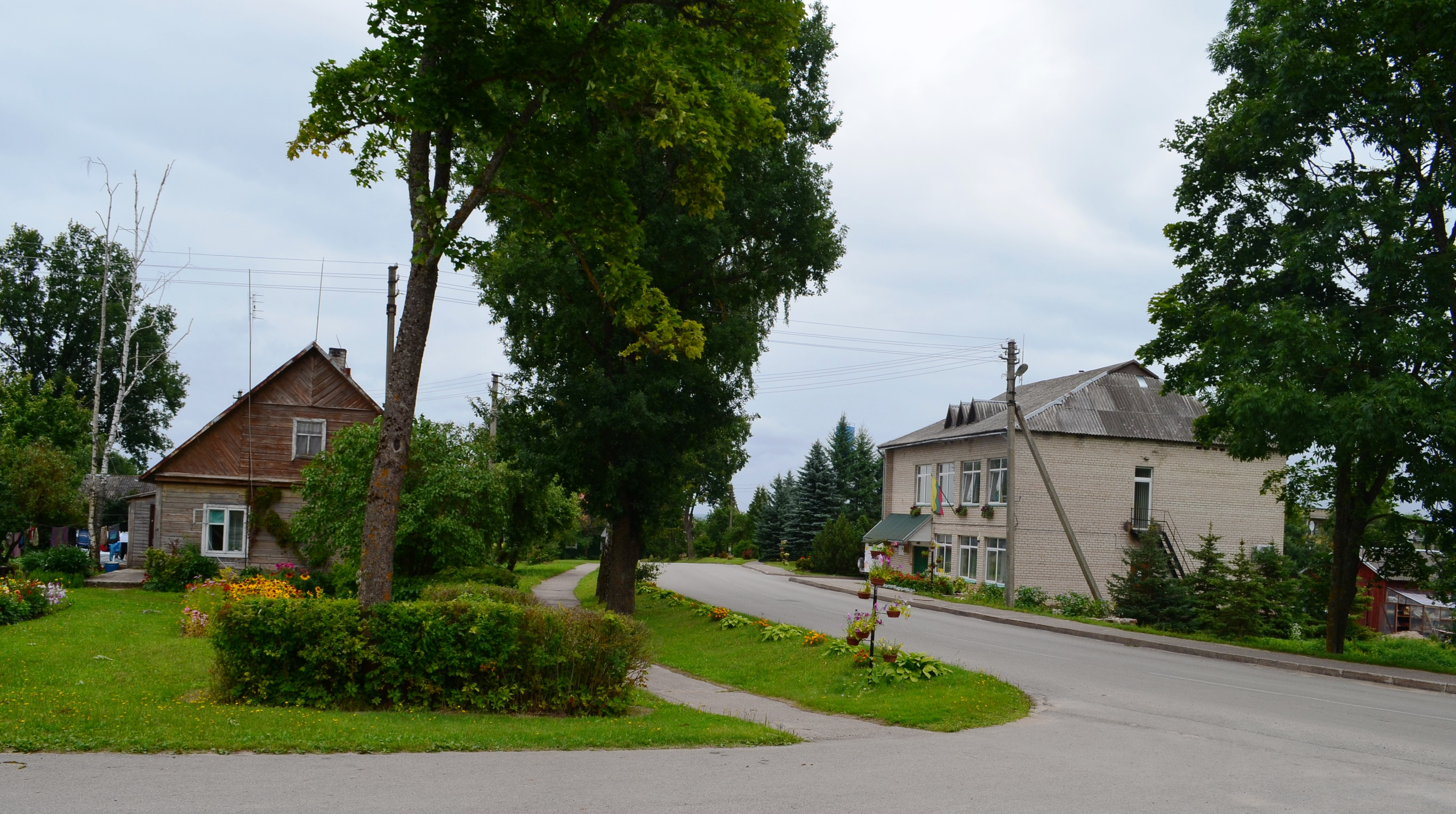

- Location within Lithuania
- Coordinates: 55°46′30″N 25°40′30″E
- Country: Lithuania
- County: Panevėžys County

Population (2011)
  - Total: 412
- Time zone: UTC+2 (EET)
  - Summer (DST): UTC+3 (EEST)

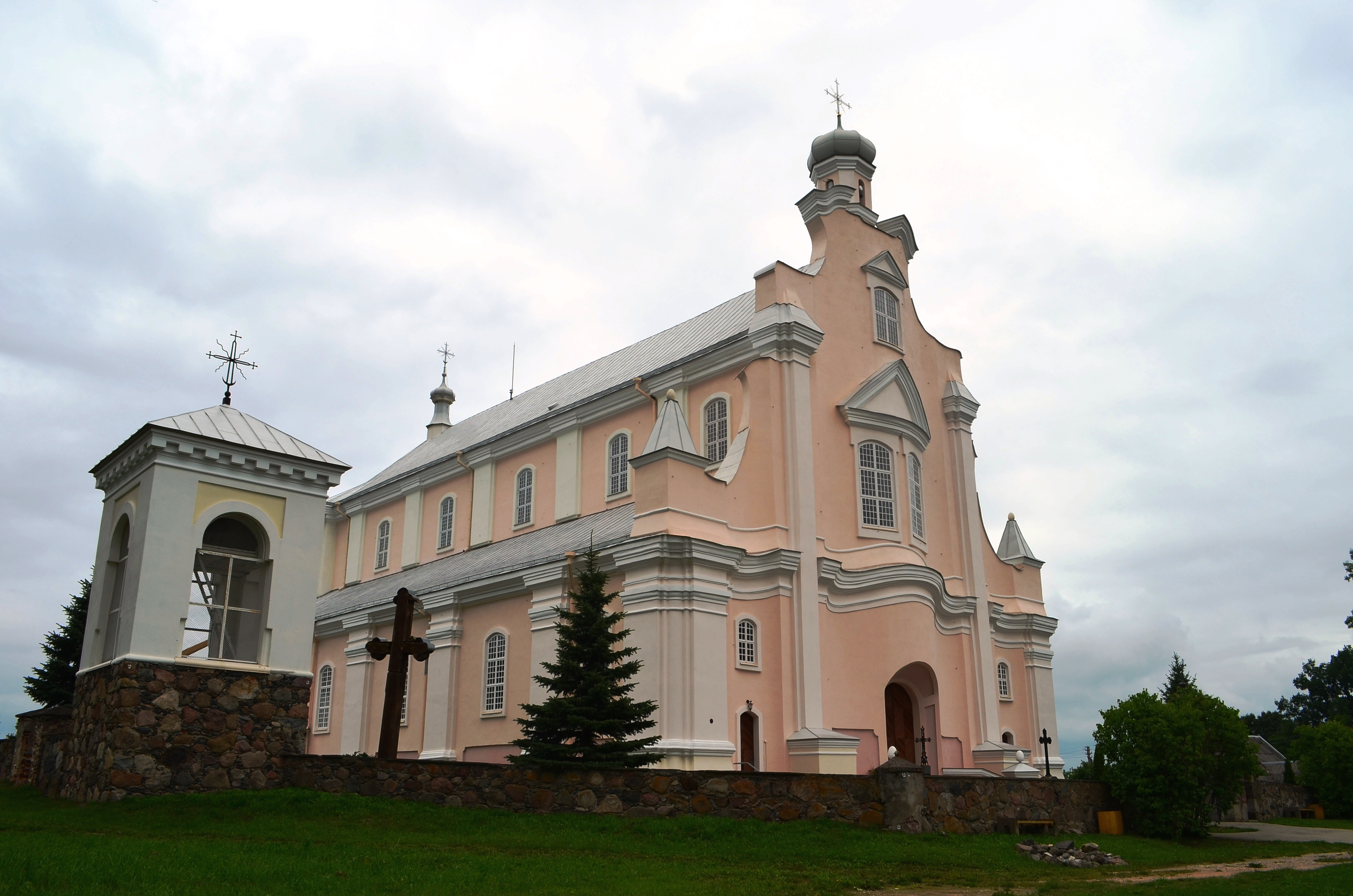
Jūžintai church

Jūžintai is a small town in Panevėžys County, in northeastern Lithuania. According to the 2011 census, the town has a population of 412 people.

== Etymology ==
The toponym is likely a hydronym derived from Lake Jūžintas, which is situated to the east of the town. Folk etymology suggests that it is composed of two words, the pronoun "jų" and the word"žentai", which are Lithuanian words used to refer to "them" and "sons-in-law", respectively. In other languages the town's name is translated as: Polish: Jużynty
