= Giedraitis =

- Lithuanian surname
- m.: Giedraitis
- f.: (unmarried): Giedraitytė
- f.: (married): Giedraitienė

Giedraitis is a Lithuanian language family name. The Polish-language version is Giedroyć.

Notable people with the surname include:

- Antanas Giedraitis (1848–1909), Polish-Lithuanian noble and geologist
- Giedraitis family, noble family in Polish-Lithuanian Commonwealth
- Andrius Giedraitis (born 1973), Lithuanian basketball player
- Merkelis Giedraitis (1536–1609), bishop of Samogitia
- Robertas Giedraitis (born 1970), Lithuanian basketball player and coach
- Rokas Giedraitis (born 1992), Lithuanian basketball player
- Romualdas Giedraitis (1750–1824), Lithuanian military commander, namesake of General Romualdas Giedraitis Artillery Battalion
