= Baltadvaris Castle =

Manor house in Lithuania

- Baltadvaris pilis (Lithuanian)
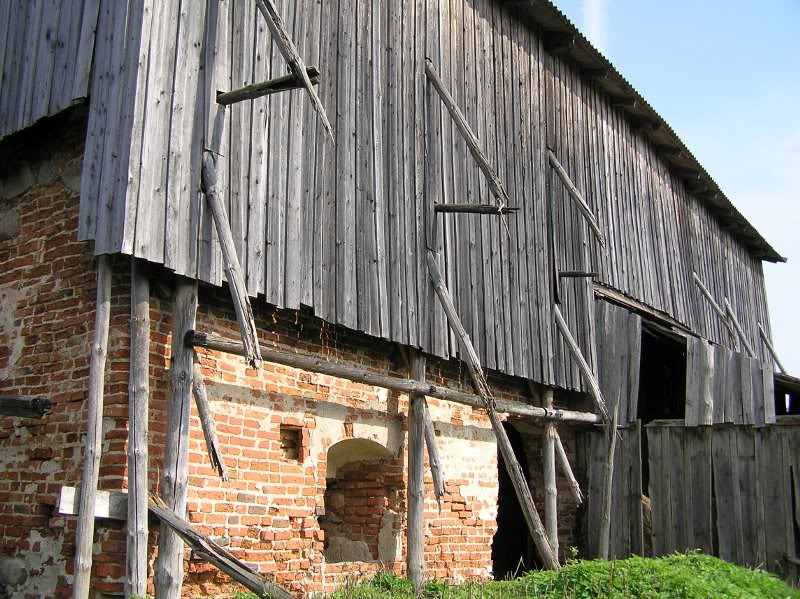
- Ruins of the castle under a protective shed in 2009
- Interactive map of Baltadvaris Castle
- 55.2266°N 25.2396°E
- Type: Fortified manor
- Location: Videniškiai, Molėtai District Municipality, Lithuania

History
- Built: Mid-16th century
- Built for: Giedraičiai (Giedroyć) family
- Original use: Fortified manor house

Site notes
- Architectural style: Renaissance
- Current use: Ruin

Baltadvaris Castle (literally: White Manor Castle; Lithuanian: Baltadvario pilis) was a fortified manor house, sometimes incorrectly described as a bastion castle, located about 2 kilometres (1.2 mi) west of Videniškiai in Molėtai District Municipality, Lithuania. Situated on the left bank of the Siesartis River, the castle was surrounded by the river on three sides.

The masonry castle with earth ramparts and wooden fortifications was constructed by Swedish builders in the 16th century in order to secure the old road from Vilnius to Riga against attacks from Livonia. Constructed by the princely Giedraičiai (Giedroyć) family, the castle was mortgaged to cover the family's debts in 1630. In the mid-17th century, the castle lost its strategic importance and became a residential manor. It was increasingly neglected and gradually fell into ruins. Today, walls of the main castle barn and eastern gates, together with foundations and cellars, have survived.

== History ==
According to a story recorded by Maciej Stryjkowski, Duke Daumantas (later confused with historical Daumantas of Pskov) from the legendary Palemonid dynasty built a castle near Videniškiai. Historians attempted to identify it with the Baltadvaris Castle. However, archaeological excavations disproved the notion. Baltadvaris Castle was likely built by Motiejus Giedraitis, Court Marshall of Lithuania, or his son Martynas Marcelis Giedraitis, Voivode of Mstsislaw, in the mid-16th century. It was known as Mūriniai Videniškiai (Brick Videniškiai) and later as Baltadvaris. The castle was built by workers invited from Sweden as near the castle there was a settlement of Swedish builders and bricklayers in the late 16th and early 17th centuries. The castle was built to secure the old road from Vilnius to Riga against attacks from Livonia.

In 1618, Marcin Giedrojć donated Videniškiai and nearby folwarks to the Augustinian monks in Vilnius. He left the Baltadvaris Castle to his son Mauricijus Kazimieras who mortgaged the property for 41,500 Polish złoty to Lew Sapieha in 1630 to cover family's debts. In August 1666, the property was acquired by Bogusław Radziwiłł for the same 41,500 złoty. However, seeing poor condition of the property, Radziwiłł sold the castle just nine months later for just 26,000 złoty to Andrzej Kossakowski, stolnik of Minsk. He owned the property for 12 years and improved it – archaeologists found fragments of glazed and unglazed tiles with the Ślepowron coat of arms used by the Kossakowski family. In the mid-17th century, the castle lost its strategic importance and became a residential manor. Its main building was plastered in white and thus the castle became known as Baltadvaris (White Manor). In 1679, the property was purchased by Anna Giedroyć-Butler (Ona Giedraitytė-Butlerienė) for the same 26,000 złoty. In 1692, the castle was purchased by a grandson of Marcin Giedrojć, but three years later he sold it to Teofil Plater (Teofilis Pliateris) who gifted the castle to the Congregation of the Mission based in Vilnius in 1695. The congregation did not turn the castle into a monastery, but used it to provide financial support to the monastery in Vilnius. In the 18th century, the economic life moved from the castle to the folwark which had an alcohol distillery and a mill. In the early 19th century, descendants of the Giedraičiai (Giedroyć) family sued the congregation for the property. Court document collected at the time provide valuable information about the castle's history.

The congregation owned the deteriorating castle until the beginning of the 19th century when it was confiscated by the Tsarist authorities pursuant to the Russification policies and given to an Eastern Orthodox monastery. In 1923, after the land reform, the property was divided and sold to farmers. In the early 20th century, a farmhouse was built in the southwestern corner of the former castle. During the Soviet era, the former castle belonged to a kolkhoz and suffered further damage as ramparts were plowed over, particularly on the southern side. Around 1950, the second floor of the surviving eastern gate was demolished and bricks used for the construction of a dam on the Siesartis River. In 1972, the castle was added to the registry of cultural monuments of Lithuania but due to a mistake it was described as a former fortified monastery. Until the late 1990s and early 2000s, the castle attracted very little attention from archaeologists or historians. The first archaeological excavation was carried out in 1987. The archaeologists removed debris and explored several sections in the territory, but no valuable artifacts were found and the excavation report was not submitted. The same year, the ruins were covered by temporary wooden structures to protect them from further erosion. With financial assistance from Michal Giedroyc, more extensive excavations were carried out in 1999–2003 that explored an area of 399 square metres (4,290 sq ft). In 2015, the former castle was declared a state protected monument.

== Architecture ==
External images
- Annotated reconstruction of the Baltadvaris Castle
- Color reconstruction of the Baltadvaris Castle

The castle ruins occupy a territory of 5.8 hectares (14 acres). The territory comprises three sections: the irregular hexagonal castle yard measuring about 120 by 120 metres (390 ft × 390 ft) surrounded by the surviving ramparts from the east and north, the castle garden measuring about 80 by 80 metres (260 ft × 260 ft) surrounded by the northern rampart and the Siesatis River on three sides, and folwark east of the castle.

Remnants of the main gate which measured 12.7 by 6.1 metres (42 ft × 20 ft) are located at the eastern rampart. The gate had two floors with four gun ports for cannons and a chapel on the second floor. Foundations of a wooden tower are located on the northern end of the eastern rampart. In the northwest, a second much better preserved rampart runs in the east–west direction. It measures about 60 metres (200 ft) in length, up to 4 metres (13 ft) in height, and about 15 metres (49 ft) in width at the base. The ramparts were likely topped with wooden defensive walls, but archaeologists did not find their remnants – possibly they were built from horizontal logs. The main castle building stood in the western corner of this rampart. It measured 21.5 by 9.4 metres (71 ft × 31 ft), had two floors, cellars under the rampart, and a gate to the castle garden. Ruins of the first-floor walls and basement have survived. The main residential building with a splendid "golden" hall and a Renaissance garden described in written sources stood in the second yard. Based on its foundations, found during archaeological excavations, the residence was built of wood in the early 17th century. There are more remnants of other buildings and ramparts in the territory. Arimeta Vojevodskaitė cataloged up to twenty different buildings mentioned in written descriptions of the castle. The castle is frequently described as a bastion castle, but there is no evidence in either archaeological findings or surviving descriptions that there were any bastions. In its heyday, the castle had mills, ponds, gardens.

In many areas, the cultural layers are disturbed. In one such disturbed layer, archaeologists found fragments of pottery that date back to the first centuries AD, well before the construction of the castle. Archaeologists found fragments of various tiles from the 16th and 17th centuries decorated with floral motifs (including cornflower), geometric figures, angels. Tiles with coats of arms were found – with the Ślepowron coat of arms used by the Kossakowski family, with an eagle holding the Zęby coat of arms the used by King Stephen Báthory, and with unidentified coats of arms. Archaeologists found about 450 fragments of various household pottery (mostly pots, but also bowls, plates, pans). Broadly, they could be classified into two categories – poor quality pottery used by the commoners and much higher quality glazed or glass pottery (including items imported from Kielce) used by the castle owners.

== See also ==
- List of castles in Lithuania
