= Katherine Swift =

Katherine Swift (1956–2004) was an Irish-born Portuguese painter, illustrator and ceramicist.

== Biography ==
Born in Dublin in 1956, Swift was the first child of Patrick Swift (painter) and Oonagh Ryan (formerly married to Alexis Guedroitz with whom she had a daughter, Ania Guédroïtz). Her uncle was the artist and man of letters John Ryan; her aunt the film actress Kathleen Ryan. Her father gave a portrait of the poet Patrick Kavanagh to the doctor, Michael Solomons, as a gift for delivering Katherine and the doctor subsequently bequeathed the portrait to the Dublin Writers Museum, where it can be seen today. Katherine had a bohemian upbringing moving between Dublin, London and the Algarve in southern Portugal. Katherine had shown a gift for drawing and painting from an early age. Her father taught and encouraged her. As a teenager she attended boarding school in England and later studied at Art College in Lisbon and London before moving back to the Algarve permanently in 1982, when her father was diagnosed with a brain tumour. Her portraits include David Wright and her father. She illustrated several books including a guide to Portuguese restaurants. Throughout her life she continuously painted the Algarve landscape. For some years her work was inspired by ancient Celtic and Iberian imagery, as can be seen in the Acrobat displayed here. Swift had exhibitions in Dublin, London, and Algarve. She worked in a variety of media including oils, acrylics, ink, watercolour and ceramics.

== Ceramics ==
Swift was involved with the pottery studio her father founded, Porches Pottery, from its inception. She showed an artistic flair from a young age and, as a child, would decorate ceramics. Swift, like her father, decorated free-hand. Following her father's death in 1983 she took over the management of Porches Pottery. At Porches she concentrated primarily on painting tile panels while also training Porches Pottery decorators in the free flowing style that is associated with Porches Pottery.

In the late 1980s Swift founded, with the ceramicist Roger Metcalfe, a ceramics workshop and studio, Estudio Destra. Estudio Destra, which continues to be a working studio and workshop) is located in a 16th-century Jewish townhouse in Silves, Algarve. Silves was once the capital of the Algarve and an important Moorish city that rivalled Lisbon. Among the very few buildings to have survived the earthquake of 1775 in Silves were the Cathedral, begun in the 13th and completed in the 15th century, and the building that today houses Estudio Destra.

At Estudio Destra, Swift specialised in painting tile panels. Here she was to "gain international repute as a ceramics painter. Kate’s splendid works are free interpretations of ancient Iberian, Islamic and pre-Islamic designs. Every piece is unique and no stencils or any kind or reproductive technique is used". Swift and her studio were the subject of a documentary on Portuguese national TV.

Swift died in 2004.

== Sources and further reading ==
- Porches Pottery website
- Estudio Destra today:
- Artists at Estudio Destra today:
- AA Portugal (Spiral), p. 17, tiles by Katherine Swift, 2009
- Patrick Swift: An Irish Painter in Portugal, Gandon Editions, 2001
- Green and Red Magazine
- Artnet
- Algarve Inspirations
- Algarve Resident: Porches Pottery- The Inside Story
- Patrick Kavanagh: A Biography, by Antoinette Quinn, Gill & MacMillan Ltd, 2001.
