= Houyoux =

Stream in Belgium

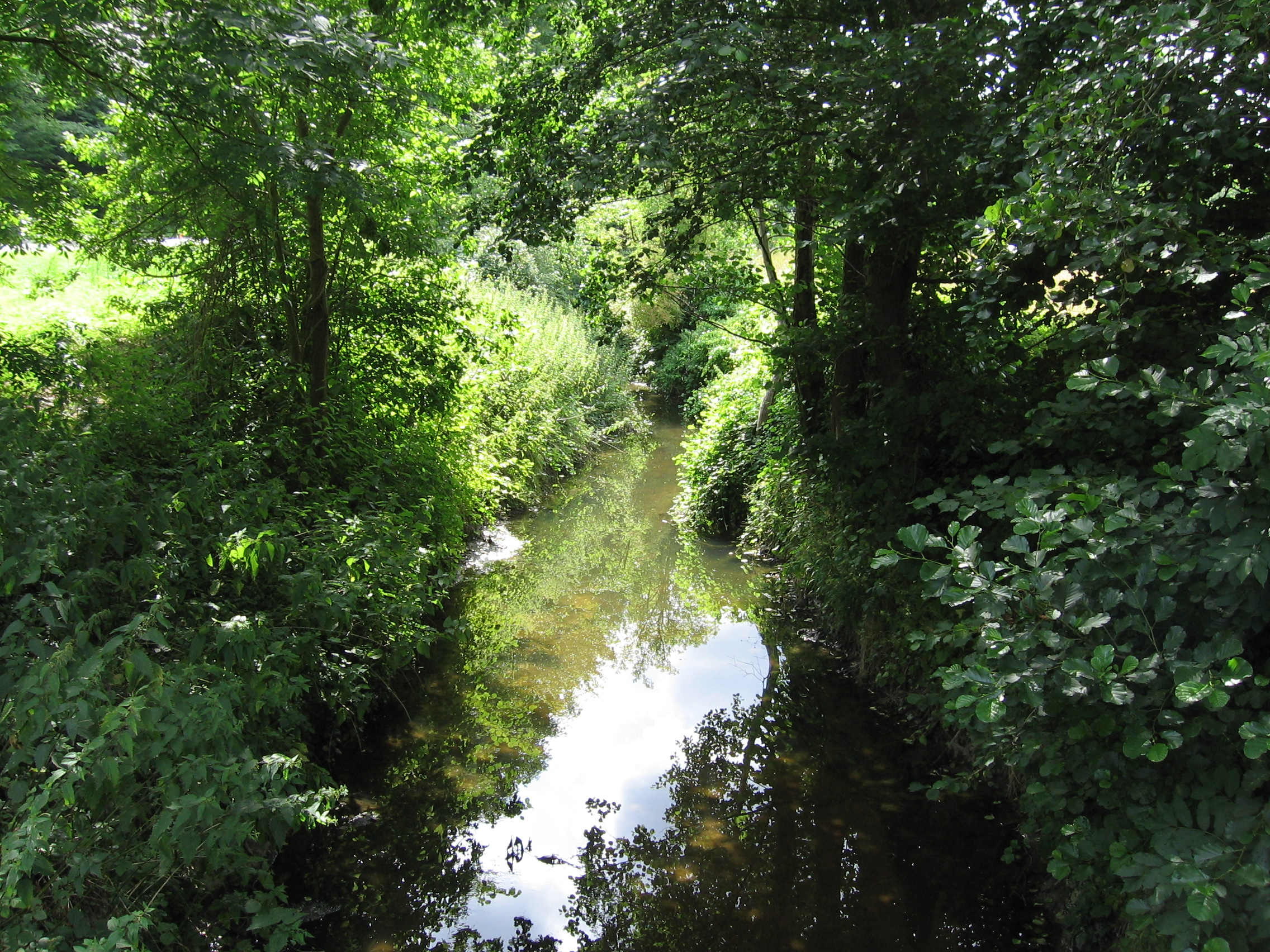
- The Houyoux before it flows into Saint-Servais

Location
- Country: Belgium
- Region: Wallonia

Physical characteristics
- Source
  - location: Scy
- Mouth: Meuse
  - location: Namur
  - coordinates: 50°27′54″N 4°52′41″E
- Discharge
  - location: Rhisnes
  - average: 0.27 m^{3} (9.5 cu ft) per second

Basin features
- Progression: Meuse→ North Sea

The Houyoux (French pronunciation: [uju]) is a northern tributary stream of the river Meuse in Belgium, flowing through Hesbaye in the province of Namur.

The Houyoux rises in Warisoulx passing through the villages of Villers-lez-Heest, Rhisnes, the Namur city suburbs of Saint-Servais and Bomel before its confluence with the Meuse in the city of Namur (In the distant past it fed the moat of the northern wall of the city of Namur).

In the past, along the Gembloux-Nemur road that passed through the old municipality of Saint-Servais, the Houyoux allowed some watermill powered industry to grow and contributed to the prosperity of the village before it became suburb of Namur.

The average flow of Houyoux measured at Rhisnes, in the municipality of La Bruyère (watershed 46 square kilometres (18 sq mi)) between 1971 and 2003 was 0.27 cubic metres (9.5 cu ft) per second. During the same period there has been:

- A maximum average annual rate of 0.48 cubic metres (17 cu ft) in 1981
- A minimum average annual rate of 0.08 cubic metres (2.8 cu ft) in 1971
