= Martynas Marcelis Giedraitis =

Lithuanian nobleman (c. 1545 – 1621)

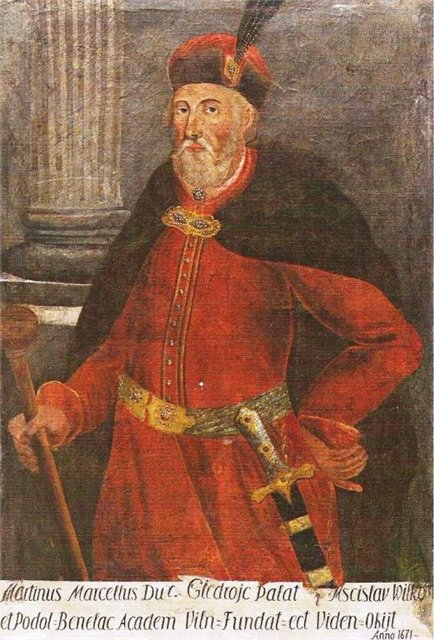
Portrait of Martin Giedroyc

Martynas Marcelis Giedraitis (c. 1545 – 10 July 1621) was a Lithuanian nobleman and statesman of the Grand Duchy of Lithuania.

== Biography ==
A member of the House of Giedroyć, Martynas Marcelis Giedraitis was born around 1545 as the son of diplomat Motiejus Giedraitis. From 1586 he was starost of Obeliai. From 1589 he was the governor of Ukmergė. Giedraitis was alive during the reign of king Stephen Báthory, who was noted for his military achievements against the Grand Duchy of Moscow. Giedraitis fought in the Livonian War and 1601 raised a group of hussars for Krzysztof "Piorun" Radziwiłł, participating in the Battle of Kokenhausen. In 1605 he led a contingent of around one hundred soldiers in the Battle of Kircholm against Sweden. From 1617 he was Voivode of Mstislaw.

A resident of Videniškiai, Giedraitis built the Baltadvaris Castle, then known as Mūriniai Videniškiai (Brick Videniškiai). He and his family allocated funds to establish monasteries in Panemunis and Videniškiai. He also supported the activities of the Academy of Vilnius (former name of Vilnius University). Giedraitis was married twice; first to Kotryna Rudminaitė, with whom he had Mauricijus Kazimieras Giedraitis and a daughter named Jadvyga, and second to Ona Aleknaitė Krivcaitė (whom he married in 1605), receiving and Kurkliai.

Giedraitis died on 10 July 1621 in either Videniškiai or Vilnius. He was either buried in the Vilnius Cathedral, or the Giedraičiai mausoleum in Videniškiai.
