= Giedroyć =

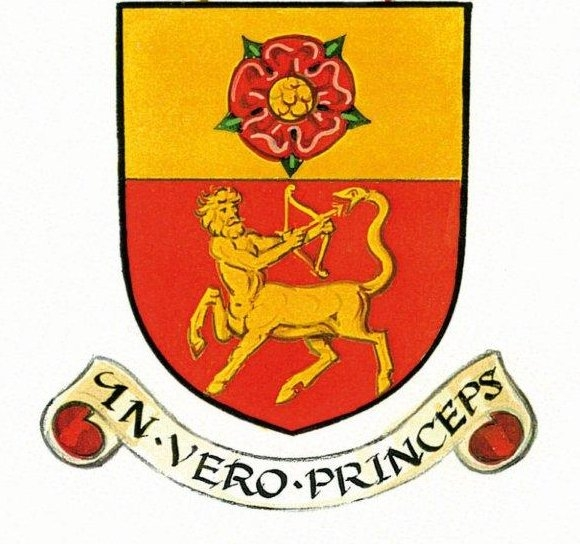

Giedroyć (Lithuanian: Giedraitis; Russian: Гедройц; French: Guedroitz) is a Polish surname, originating from the Giedroyć princely family of the Grand Duchy of Lithuania and later the Polish-Lithuanian Commonwealth.

== Overview ==
16th century Lithuanian Chronicles relate that Giedrius (Palemonids), a brother of Grand Duke Traidenis of Lithuania (died 1282), built a castle, named it Giedraičiai (Giedroyty), and adopted the title Prince of Giedraičiai (kniaz Giedryotski). Many other Lithuanian families considered Giedrius as their ancestor, among them Ginwił, Jamontowicz and Giedroyć-Juraha. Their original name Kgedrojt or Kgedrotiski was later polonised to Gedrojc, Giedrojć and Giedroyć.

The first historical mention of the Giedroyć family dates from 1399, when Grand Duke Vytautas tried the case between the Giedroyć princes and the Bishop of Vilnius. Numerous members of the family were recorded in the 15th and 16th centuries, and thereafter, with the title Prince.

The two lines of the family for which coherent genealogies are available (the family's "central core") descend from (i) Prince Aleksander (late 15th century) and (ii) Prince Bartłomiej (died in 1524).

The 1569 Act of Union inaugurating the Polish-Lithuanian Commonwealth confirmed that, as previously in the Grand Duchy of Lithuania, Lithuanian families of dynastic origin remained entitled to use the title Prince. Many subsequent Giedroyć family members, both of the Line of Aleksander and of the Line of Bartłomiej, were recorded with the title Prince – including several (of both Lines) whose right to the title was individually confirmed under Imperial Russian legislation of 1832. Other members did not seek such specific confirmation under the Russian Empire, but relied on confirmation of their noble status and princely origins under Russian legislation of 1801/3. The Imperial Russian heraldic authority classified these as "of the Princes".

Under the usage of the Grand Duchy of Lithuania, as confirmed by the 1569 Act of Union, princely origins in themselves establish princely status.

== Armorial bearings ==
The Second Edition of the Lithuanian Chronicles records that a centaur was the armorial charge of the forebears of Giedrus. A decree issued in 1401 by Jogaila, King of Poland and Grand Duke of Lithuania, confirms the right of Prince Michał Giedroyć vel. Ratybor (baptized c.1387) to the arms Hippocentaurus "as used by his illustrious grandfather" Ginwill (2nd Duke of Giedrojcie and candidate to the grand ducal office of Lithuania).

But the earliest surviving illustrated Giedroyć armorial charge is a rose, on seals attached to state documents of 1431–34.

Through the 17th and 18th centuries, the centaur was used predominantly by most members of the family, sometimes in combination with the rose; while the descendants of Mikołaj (died 1657, sixth generation in the Line of Bartłomiej) continued to use the rose alone. But the centaur (sometimes with the rose, sometimes without) predominates in all the 19th century Russian records, even for the descendants of Mikołaj.

At the English College of Arms, the arms of Michal Giedroyc (born 1929, 16th generation in the Line of Bartłomiej) include both the rose and the centaur (called a sagittary in English heraldry) blazoned as follows: Per fess Or and Gules in chief a Rose Gules barbed and seeded proper and in base a Sagittary trippant to the dexter the head facing to the sinister his tail a serpent facing to the dexter holding in the hands a Bow with arrow drawn and set towards the head of the serpent all Or.

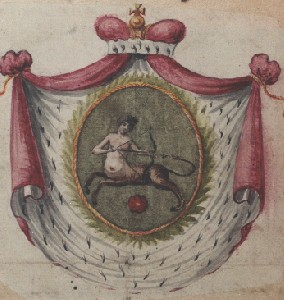
These arms appear on a document recording confirmation in 1800, by the Wilno General Assembly of Deputies for Pedigrees, of the princely descent of several members of the Giedroyć family (descendants of Benedykt Stanisław, five times great-grandson of the eponymous Aleksander in the Line of Aleksander)

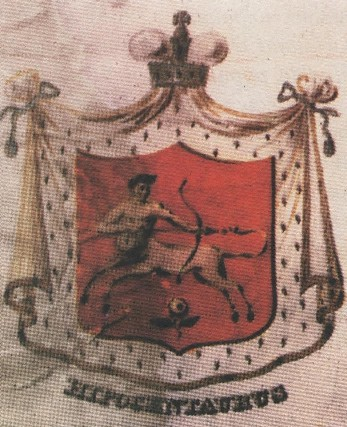
These arms appear on the genealogy known as the “Korwie Tree”, which was commissioned before 1862 by descendants of Antoni Stanisław, seven times great-grandson of the eponymous Aleksander in the Line of Aleksander

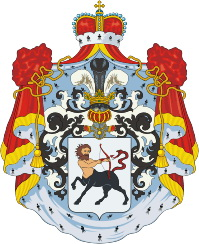
In 1880, Russian Czar Alexander II confirmed the right of Kazimir Michaił (eleventh generation in the Line of Bartłomiej) to bear these arms

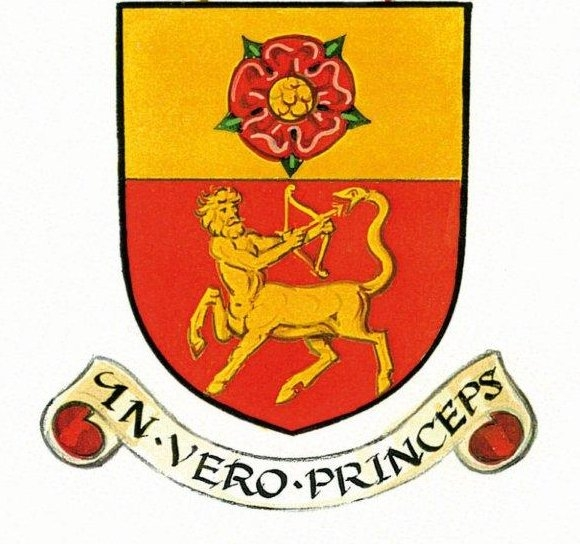
Giedroyć arms recorded at the English College of Arms

== Notable people ==
Early bearers of the Giedroyć name included:

- Blessed Michał Giedroyć, pre-dating the lines of Aleksander and Bartłomiej: buried in the church of St Mark in Kraków, where he lived most of his life as a hermit renowned for gifts of prophecy and miracles; died in 1485.
- son of the eponymous Bartłomiej in the Line of Bartłomiej: Mateusz Giedroyć (envoy to Ivan the Terrible 1551, Grand Ducal Governor of Vilnius, Grand Ducal Marshal, died 1562/3).
- grandsons of the eponymous Bartłomiej in the Line of Bartłomiej: Kacper-Dowmont Giedroyć (born c1535, signatory of the Act of Union 1569), Merkelis Giedraitis (c1536-1609, Bishop of Samogitia and champion of the Lithuanian language and culture) and Martin-Dowmont Giedroyć (died 1621, Palatine of Mstislaw).

Other distinguished members of the two main lines of the family included:

- Jan Stefan Giedroyć (1730–1803, 9th generation of the Line of Aleksander, a fifth cousin of General Romuald's father): Bishop of Livonia, and later of Samogitia; a member of the Permanent Council of the Polish-Lithuanian Commonwealth.
- General Romuald Giedroyć (1750–1824, 10th generation in the Line of Aleksander): fought as Major General in the 1792 war against Russia; played a major role in the 1794 uprising in the Grand Duchy of Lithuania; moved to Paris after the 1795 collapse and partition of the Polish-Lithuanian Commonwealth; served as a General in Napoleon's Grande Armée 1813; exiled in Archangel; then a Lieutenant General in the Kingdom of Poland from 1815.
- General Romuald's brother, Monsignor Piotr Kacper Giedroyć (died 1797): Secretary of State of the Grand Duchy of Lithuania 1790–95.
- Juozapas Arnulfas Giedraitis (1754–1838, 9th generation in the line of Bartłomiej): Bishop of Samogitia from 1801, succeeding Bishop Stefan Jan above; benefactor of the Church, champion of education and patron of Lithuanian literature, he published in 1814 the first translation of the New Testament into Samogitian (a dialect of the Lithuanian language), which was revised in 1816.
- Ignacy Giedroyć (active 1763–1792, 9th generation of the line of Bartłomiej, first cousin of Bishop Józef Arnolf above): Quartermaster General of the Grand Duchy of Lithuania; Governor of Osiek; envoy in 1771 to Frederick the Great of Prussia and to Frederick II, Landgrave of Hesse-Kassel on behalf of the Bar Confederation (the Polish-Lithuanian anti-Russian movement).
- Szymon Mikołaj Giedroyć (1764–1844, 10th generation in the line of Aleksander, first cousin once removed of Bishop Stefan Jan above): Bishop Coadjutor and - from 1829 - Administrator of Samogitia.
- Ignacy Michał Giedroyć (1771–1829, 10th generation in the line of Aleksander, second cousin of Bishop of Szymon Tadeusz Michał above): Bishop Coadjutor of Samogitia, titular Bishop of Casio.
- General Romuald's son, Józef Stefan Franciszek Ksawery Giedroyć (1787–1855): Colonel in the Grande Armée 1808–1815, promoted Brigadier General on the field of the Battle of Waterloo.
- General Romuald's daughter, Kunegunda Franciszka Róża Giedroyć (1793–1883): Lady in Waiting to French Empress Josephine (Joséphine de Beauharnais), and to Russian Tsarina Elizabeth Alexeievna (Louise of Baden), wife of Alexander I of Russia.
- Witold Giedroyć (1826/30-1885, 12th generation in the line of Aleksander) and his first cousin once removed Mikołaj Karol Giedroyć (1825–1894, 13th generation in the line of Aleksander): leaders of the anti-Russian conspiracy of 1863.
- Franciszek Ignacy Dowmont Giedroyć (1869–1944, 14th generation in the line of Bartłomiej, third cousin five times removed of Bishop Józef Arnolf above): Professor of the History and Philosophy of Medicine at the University of Warsaw, member of the Polish Academy of Sciences, co-founder of the Polish school of the history of medicine.
- Vera Gedroits (1876–1932, 12th generation of the line of Bartłomiej, third cousin once removed of Bishop Józef Arnolf above, and sixth cousin twice removed of Franciszek Ignacy Dowmont above): the first female surgeon in Russia, her work on laparotomies during the Russo-Japanese War was among the first to achieve a high success rate, leading the Russian army to adopt the procedure and changing understandings of the correct treatment of abdominal wounds. She was surgeon to the imperial family at Tsarskoye Selo from 1909; worked at the front in World War I; and was professor (from 1923) and then chair of the surgery faculty (from 1930) at the Kiev Medical Institute. She also published poetry under the pseudonym Sergei Gedroitz.
- Tadeusz Giedroyć (1889/90-1941, 15th generation in the line of Bartłomiej, third cousin once removed of Franciszek Ignacy Dowmont above): soldier, awarded the Polish Cross of Valour in 1918, and Cross of Independence in 1932; lawyer, administrator; Senator of the Second Polish Republic from 1938; imprisoned by the Russians in 1939, and subsequently murdered by the Soviet secret police, NKVD.
- Jerzy Giedroyc (1906–2000, 14th generation in the line of Aleksander, fifth cousin twice removed of Witold above): founder, editor and publisher of the literary-political journal Kultura. The Polish parliament declared 2006 the year of Jerzy Giedroyć.
- Michal Giedroyc (1929–2017, 16th generation in the line of Bartłomiej, son of Tadeusz above): aircraft engineer and expert in the history of medieval Lithuania.

Current members of the family include:

- Coky Giedroyc (Mary-Rose Helen Giedroyć, born 1963, 17th generation in the line of Bartłomiej, daughter of Michal Jan Henryk above): film and TV director.
- Mel Giedroyc (Melanie Clare Sophie Giedroyć born 1968, 17th generation in the line of Bartłomiej, daughter of Michal Jan Henryk above): English actress, presenter and writer.

Bearers of the name Guedroitz (the French version of the Russian version of Giedroyć) include:

- Wladimir Guedroitz (1869–1941, 13th generation in the line of Aleksander, great-great-nephew of Bishop Szymon Tadeusz Michał Giedroyć above): Chairman of the Commission for Control at the Russian Ministry of Finance.
- Alexis Guedroitz (1923–1992, 15th generation in the line of Aleksander, grandson of Wladimir above): Belgian professor of Russian language, lecturer and writer.
- Ania Guédroïtz (born 1949, 16th generation in the line of Aleksander, daughter of Alexis above): Belgian actress.

== Bibliography ==
- Ferrand, Les Familles Princières de l'Ancien Empire de Russie
- Lenczewski, Genealogie rodów utytułowanych w Polsce (Genealogy of Titled Families in Poland)
- Wolff, Józef (1895). Kniaziowie litewsko-ruscy od końca czternastego wieku.
