= Giedraičiai =

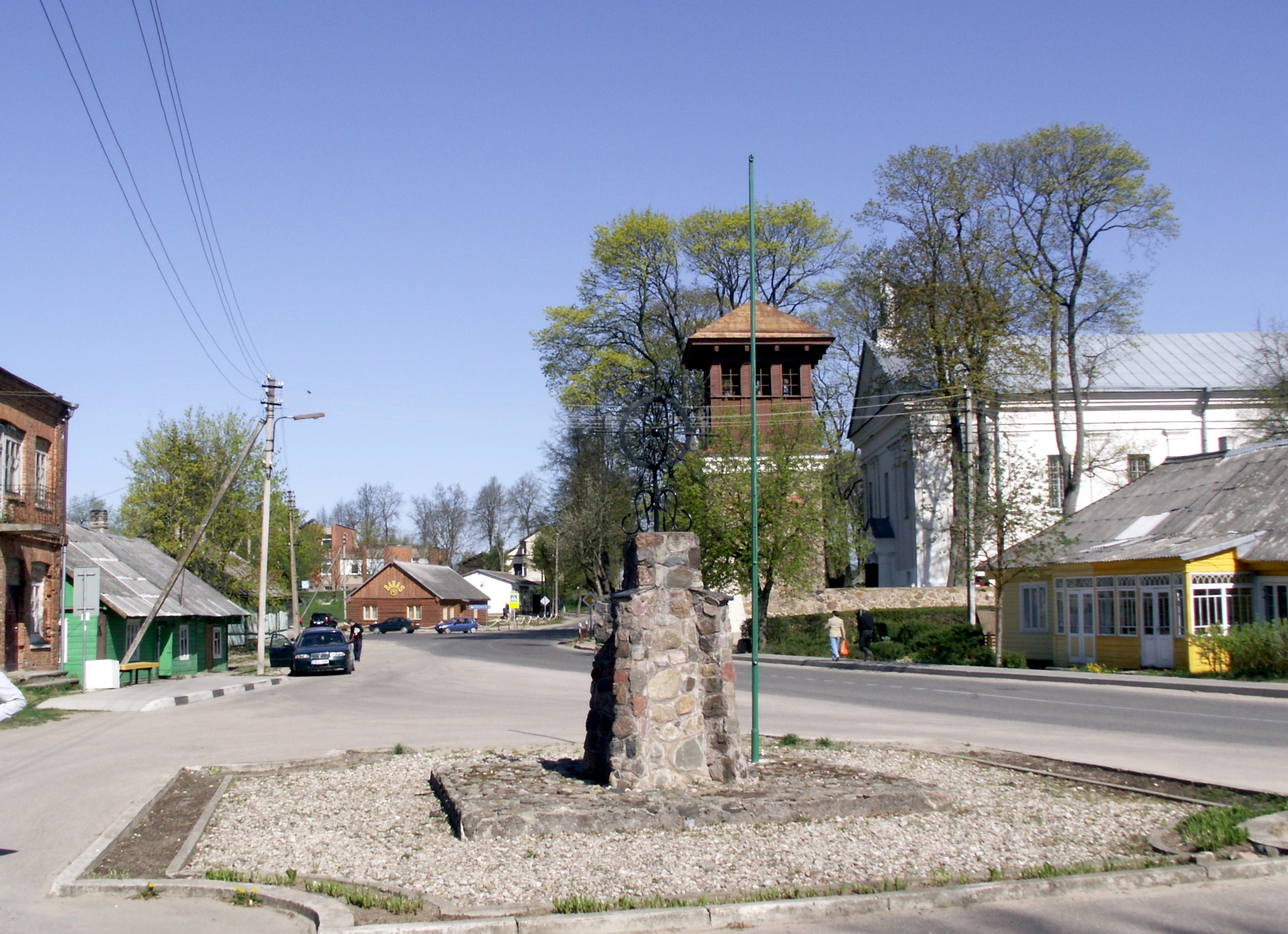
- Giedraičiai Church and belfry

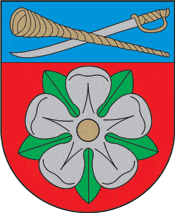
- Coat of arms

- Location of Giedraičiai
- Coordinates: 55°04′40″N 25°15′30″E
- Country: Lithuania
- Ethnographic region: Aukštaitija
- County: Utena County
- Municipality: Molėtai district municipality
- Eldership: Giedraičiai eldership
- Capital of: Giedraičiai eldership
- First mentioned: 1338

Population (2011)
  - Total: 684
- Time zone: UTC+2 (EET)
  - Summer (DST): UTC+3 (EEST)

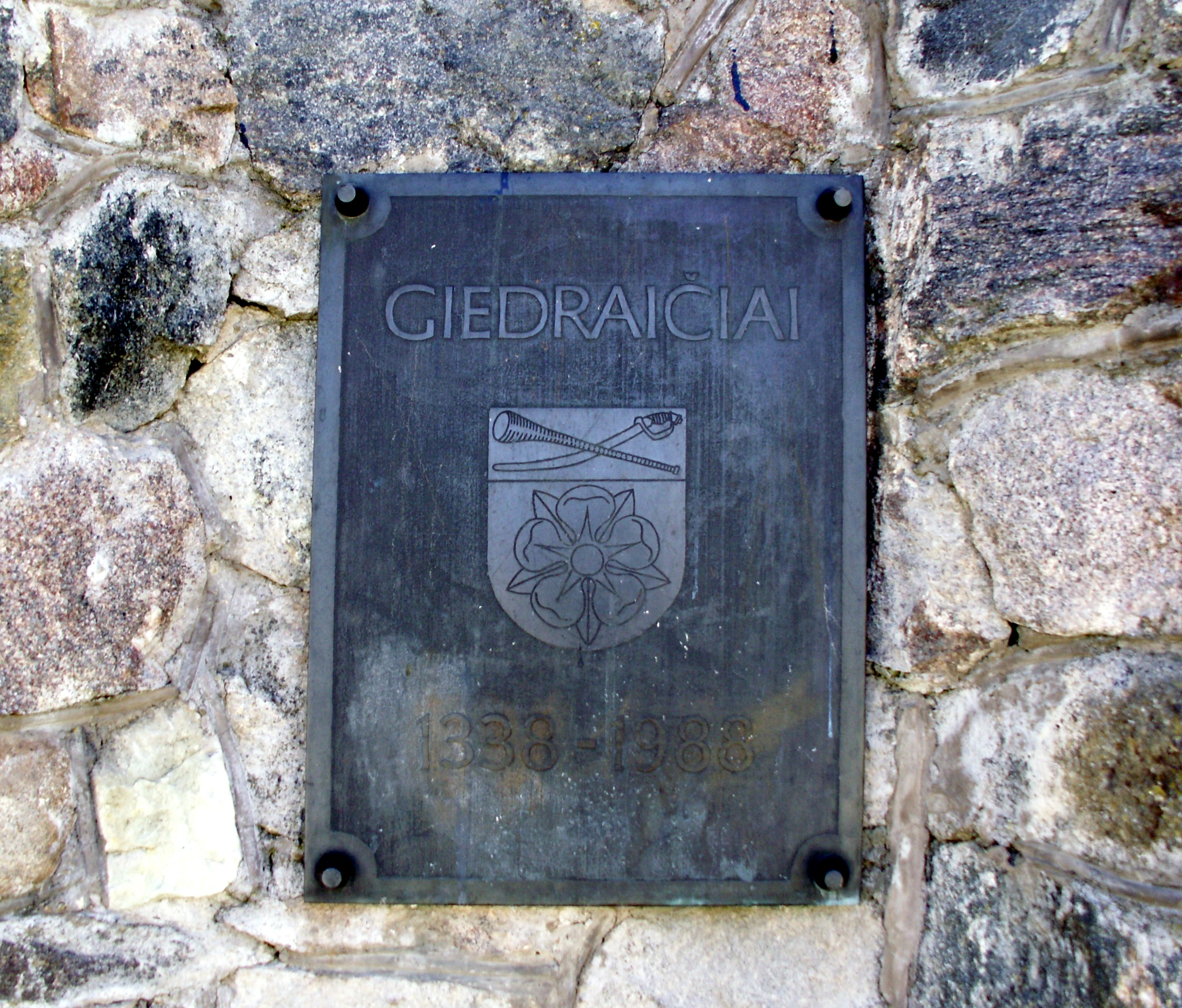
The memorial board for Giedraičiai-650

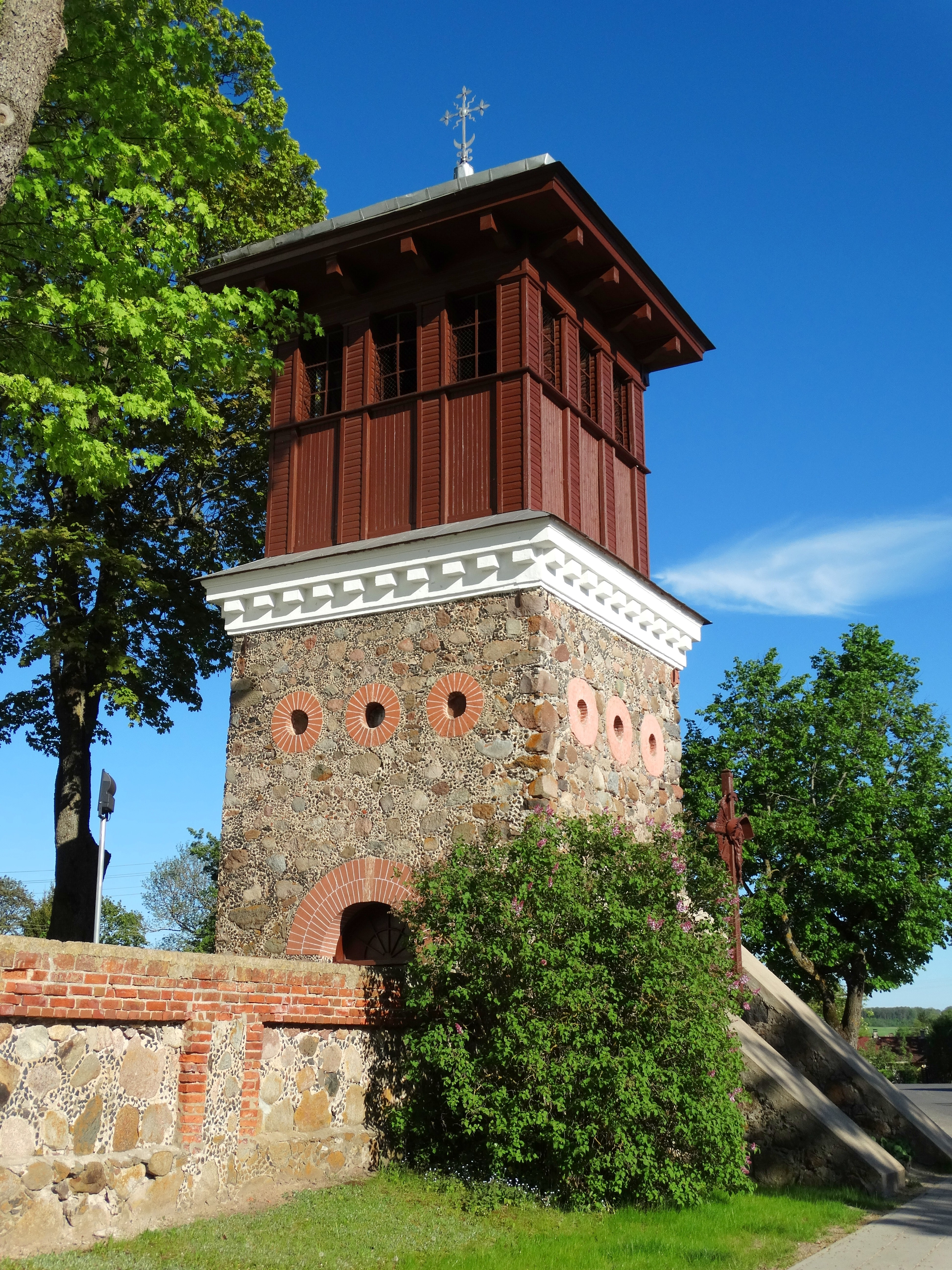
Bell tower of Church of St. Bartholomew

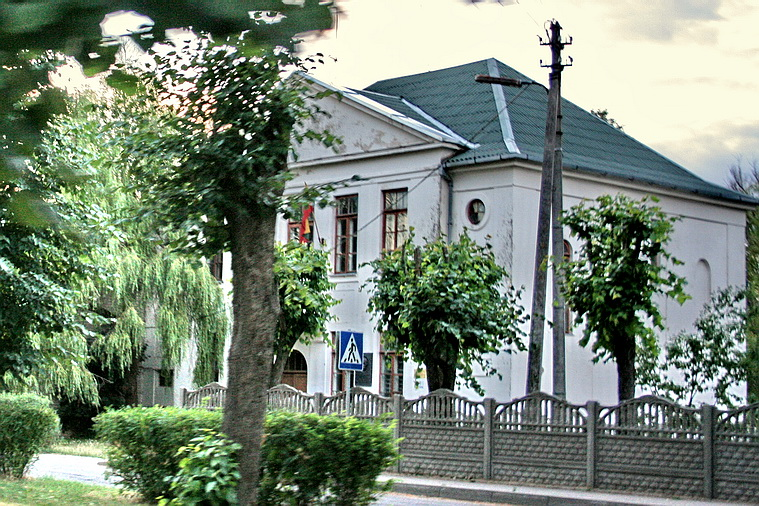
The old school in Giedraičiai

Giedraičiai is a town in Molėtai district municipality, Lithuania with about 700 residents. It is located some 45 km north of Vilnius, capital of Lithuania, on the banks of Lake Kiementas. It is the capital of an elderate. The town, according to a local legend founded by Duke Giedrius, is first mentioned in written sources in 1338 when Grand Duke Gediminas signed a peace treaty with the Teutonic Knights. For a long time it was the centre of Giedraitis family estate.

== History ==
It is known that since 1777, the town had a parish school. A hundred years later it was reorganized to a grammar, and later to middle school. Today, the high school is named after Antanas Jaroševičius, a painter who in 1912 published an album of Lithuanian crosses. The school building houses a small museum about local history.

In 1410, Church of St. Bartholomew the Apostle was built. It was rebuilt in 1809 in the Classicism style by Bishop of Samogitia Juozapas Arnulfas Giedraitis, whose princely family originated from Giedraičiai. In 1838, after his death and according to his wishes, Giedraitis' heart was inlaid into one of the walls. In the mid-19th century a new bell tower was built. It is interesting because of unusual design: stone walls are decorated with red bricks.

In 1920 the town witnessed fights between Lithuanians and Poles led by Lucjan Żeligowski. After the Polish-Lithuanian War, Żeligowski staged a fake rebellion by Polish army units and captured Vilnius on October 9, 1920. His troops were advancing further, but were stopped near Giedraičiai and Širvintos on November 17–21. League of Nations interfered and the fighting stopped, but the disputes over the Vilnius region were not resolved. Today, the town commemorates the Lithuanian victims with a monument which has survived the Soviet regime. On ornament from the monument, a sword and a trumpet, is used in the coat of arms of the town.

During the occupation of Lithuania by Germany and its rule under German military, on July 7, 1941, and at the beginning of August 1941, a death squad of Lithuanian collaborators, ordered by German military administration, murdered Jews of the town in mass executions.

== Transport ==
Molėtai Aero Club (ICAO airport code: EYMO) is located some 7 km north of Giedraičiai.

== See also ==
- Giedroyć
