= Samuel Eliot Morison bibliography =

List of books and articles

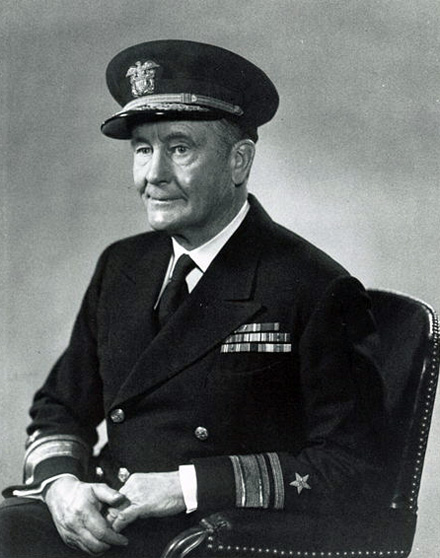
- Books↙: 60
- Articles↙: 164
- Additional writings↙: 24

The Samuel Eliot Morison bibliography contains a list of books and articles written by American historian Samuel Eliot Morison.

== Books ==
The following is a list of books written by Samuel Eliot Morison, arranged chronologically.

- Life and Letters of Harrison Gray Otis. 2 vols. Boston: Houghton Mifflin, 1913.
- A History of the Constitution of Massachusetts. Boston: Wright & Potter, 1917.
- The Maritime History of Massachusetts, 1783–1860. Boston: Houghton Mifflin. 1921.
- A Prologue to American History: An Inaugural Lecture. Oxford: Clarendon Press, 1922.
- Sources and Documents Illustrating the American Revolution, 1764–1788, and the Formation of the Federal Constitution. Oxford: Clarendon Press, 1923.
- The Class Lives of Samuel Eliot and Nathaniel Homes Morison, Harvard 1839. Boston: Privately printed, 1926.
- Oxford History of the United States. 2 vols. Oxford: Oxford University Press, 1927.
- An Hour of American History: From Columbus to Coolidge. Philadelphia: J. B. Lippincott & Co., 1929.
- Builders of the Bay Colony. Boston: Houghton Mifflin, 1930.
- The Growth of the American Republic 2 vols. Oxford: Oxford University Press, 1930.
  - Growth of the American Republic (5th ed.), New York: Oxford University Press, 1962, OL 5826083M
- Historical Background for the Massachusetts Bay Tercentenary in 1930. Boston: Massachusetts Bay Tercentenary, Inc., 1928, 1930.
- Historical Markers Erected by Massachusetts Bay Colony Tercentenary Commission. Boston: Commonwealth of Massachusetts. 1930 – via Internet Archive. "Texts of Inscriptions as Revised by Samuel Eliot Morison"
- The Proprietors of Peterborough, New Hampshire. Peterborough: Historical Society, 1930.
- The Young Man Washington. Cambridge: Harvard University Press, 1932.
- The Founding of Harvard College. Cambridge: Harvard University Press, 1935.
- The Events of the Year MDCCCCXXXV. Boston: Merrymount Press, 1936.
- Harvard College in the Seventeenth Century. 2 vols. Cambridge: Harvard University Press, 1936.
- The Puritan Pronaos. New York: New York University Press, 1936.
  - Intellectual Life of Colonial New England, New York University Press, 1956, OL 6199651M
- Three Centuries of Harvard, 1636–1936. Cambridge: Harvard University Press, 1936.
- The Pilgrim Fathers: Their Significance in History. Boston: Merrymount Press, 1937. Reprinted, Plymouth, MA: Plimouth Plantation, 1951.
- The Ancient Classics in a Modern Democracy. New York: Oxford University Press, 1939.
- Doctor Morison's Farewell to the Colonial Society of Massachusetts. Boston: Merrymount Press, 1939.
- The Second Voyage of Christopher Columbus. New York: Oxford University Press, 1939.
- Portuguese Voyages to America in the Fifteenth Century. Cambridge: Harvard University Press, 1940.
- Admiral of the Ocean Sea. 2 vols. Boston: Little, Brown and Company, 1942.
- History As A Literary Art. Boston: Old South Association, 1946.
- History of United States Naval Operations in World War II. 15 vols. Boston: Little, Brown and Company, 1947–62.
- These Forty Years. Boston: Privately printed, 1948. (Address to the 40th Reunion, Harvard Class of 1908)
- Ropemakers of Plymouth. Boston: Houghton Mifflin, 1950.
- Of Plymouth Plantation, 1620–1647. Editor. New York: Knopf, 1952.
- By Land and By Sea. New York: Knopf, 1953.
- Christopher Columbus, Mariner. Boston: Little, Brown and Company, 1955.
- Freedom in Contemporary Society. Boston: Little, Brown and Company, 1956.
- The Story of the 'Old Colony' of New Plymouth, 1620–1692. New York: Knopf, 1956.
- Nathaniel Homes Morison. Baltimore: Peabody Institute, 1957.
- American Contributions to the Strategy of World War II. London: Oxford University Press, 1958.
- Strategy and Compromise. Boston: Little, Brown and Company, 1958.
- William Hickling Prescott. Boston: Massachusetts Historical Society, 1958.
- John Paul Jones: A Sailor's Biography. Boston: Little, Brown and Company, 1959.
- A New and Fresh English Translation of the Letter of Columbus Announcing the Discovery of America. Madrid: Graficas Yagues, 1959.
- The Story of Mount Desert Island, Maine. Boston: Little, Brown and Company, 1960.
- The Scholar in American: Past, Present, and Future. New York: Oxford University Press, 1961.
- Introduction to Whaler Out of New Bedford. New Bedford: Old Dartmouth Historical Society, 1962.
- One Boy's Boston, 1887-1901, Boston: Houghton Mifflin, 1962, OL 5855232M
- Harvard Guide to American History. Cambridge: Harvard University Press, 1963. (with Arthur Meier Schlesinger, Frederick Merk, Arthur Meier Schlesinger, Jr., and Paul Herman Buck)
- A History of the Constitution of Massachusetts. Boston: Special Commission on Revision of the Constitution, 1963.
- The Two Ocean War. Boston: Little, Brown and Company, 1963.
- The Journals and other Documents Relating to the Life and Voyages of Christopher Columbus. Edited and Translated by Samuel Eliot Morison with illustrations by Lima de Freitas. New York: First Editions Club; Heritage Press, 1963. Reprinted Norwalk, CT: Easton Press, 1990.
- The Caribbean as Columbus Saw It. Boston: Little, Brown and Company, 1964. (with Mauricio Obregon)
- Vistas of History. New York: Knopf, 1964.
- Oxford History of the American People, New York: Oxford University Press, 1965, OL 5941793M
- Spring Tides. Boston: Houghton Mifflin, 1965.
- Old Bruin: Commodore Matthew Calbraith Perry, 1796–1858. Boston: Little, Brown and Company, 1967.
- Life in Washington a Century and a Half Ago. Washington, DC: Cosmos Club, 1968.
- Harrison Gray Otis, 1765–1848: The Urbane Federalist. Boston: Houghton Mifflin, 1969.
- The European Discovery of America. 2 vols. New York: Oxford University Press, 1971–1974.
- Samuel de Champlain: Father of New France. Boston: Little, Brown and Company, 1972.
- Francis Parkman. Boston: Massachusetts Historical Society, 1973.
- The Conservative American Revolution. Washington, DC: Society of the Cincinnati, 1976.
- Beck, Emily Morison, ed. (1977), Sailor Historian: The Best of Samuel Eliot Morison, Boston: Houghton Mifflin, ISBN 0395254442, OCLC 301537251, OL 4542508M

== Articles ==
The following is a list of articles written by Samuel Eliot Morison, arranged chronologically.

1900s

- "The Kremlin of Moscow". Horae Scholasticae 36 (1902): 26–28.

1910s

- "The First National Nominating Convention". American Historical Review 17 (1912): 744–63.
- "The Massachusetts Embassy to Washington, 1815". Proceedings of the Massachusetts Historical Society 48 (1914–15): 343–51.
- "DuPont, Tallyrand, and the French Spoilations". Proceedings of the Massachusetts Historical Society 49 (1915–16): 63–79.
- "The Struggle Over the Adoption of the Massachusetts Constitution, 1780". Proceedings of the Massachusetts Historical Society 50 (1916–17): 353–411.
- "The Vote of Massachusetts on Summoning a Constitutional Convention, 1776–1916". Proceedings of the Massachusetts Historical Society 50 (1916–17): 241–49.
- "Ephraim Eliot's Private Report of the Class of 1780". Publications of the Colonial Society of Massachusetts 19 (1918): 290–95.
- "Harvard in the Colonial Wars, 1675–1748". Harvard Graduates' Magazine 26 (1918): 554–74.
- "The Eastern Baltic: (I) The Peace Conference and the Baltic; (II) Latvia; (III) Latvia, Continued; (IV) Esthonia; (V) Finland". The New Europe 12 (1919): 77–82, 127–32, 155–59, 200–205, 270–75.
- "The Property of Harrison Gray Otis, Loyalist". Publications of the Colonial Society of Massachusetts 14 (1919): 320–50.

1920s

- "The Education of John Marshall". Atlantic Monthly 126 (July 1920): 45–54.
- "The New Baltic Republics: (I) Esthonia and Latvia: (II) Lithuania and Finland". The Youth's Companion (7 October, 28 October 1920.)
- "Remarks on Economic Conditions in Massachusetts in 1780". Publications of the Colonial Society of Massachusetts 20 (1920): 191–92.
- "Boston Traders in the Hawaiian Islands, 1789–1823", Proceedings of the Massachusetts Historical Society, vol. 54, 1920–21, hdl:2027/uc1.b3499695: 9–47; Washington Historical Quarterly 12 (1921–22): 166–201. (Note: Reprinted in By Land and By Sea, pp. 66–98, without notes.)
- "Custom–House Records in Massachusetts as a Source of History". Proceedings of the Massachusetts Historical Society 54 (1920–21): 324–31.
- "Memoir of Alden Bradford". Proceedings of the Massachusetts Historical Society 55 (1921–22): 153–64.
- "Memoir of Edward Henry Clement". Proceedings of the Massachusetts Historical Society 56 (1922–23): 57–68.
- The Commerce of Boston on the Eve of the Revolution. Proceedings of the American Antiquarian Society New Series 31: 24–51. 1923
- "Liberty and the Constitution". Proceedings of the Massachusetts Society of Sons of the Revolution (1923): 91–121.
- "The Old American Merchant Marine". The Landmark 5 (1923): 793–99.
- "Dr. Amos Windship, 1745–1813, The Biography of a Rascal". Publications of the Colonial Society of Massachusetts 25 (1924): 141–71.
- "Extracts from the Commonplace Book of Ephraim Eliot and from Newspapers Relating to Seth Hudson and Joshua Howe". Publications of the Colonial Society of Massachusetts 25 (1924): 40–43.
- "The Log of the Pilgrim, 1781–1782". Publications of the Colonial Society of Massachusetts 25 (1924): 94–124.
- "The Origins of the Monroe Doctrine, 1775–1823". Economica 1 (February 1924): 27–51.
- "The Will of a Boston Slave". Publications of the Colonial Society of Massachusetts 25 (1924): 253–54.
- "An American Professor's Reflections on Oxford". London Spectator (7 November, 14 November 1925).
- "Impressions of Harvard After Oxford". Harvard Alumni Bulletin 28 (1925–26): 917–20.
- "Sir Charles Vaughan's Viaticum of 1826". Proceedings of the Massachusetts Historical Society 59 (1925–26): 377–414.
- "Charles Bagot's Notes on Housekeeping and Entertaining in Washington, 1819". Publications of the Colonial Society of Massachusetts 26 (1927): 438–46.
- "New England and the Opening of the Columbia River Salmon Trade". Oregon Historical Quarterly 28 (1927): 111–32.
- "Nova Albion and New England". Oregon Voter (14 Aug. 1926), and Oregon Historical Quarterly 28 (1927): 1–17.
- "Robert Morris". Harvard Business School Alumni Bulletin (15 December 1927.).
- "Did William Bradford Leave Leyden Before the Pilgrims". Proceedings of the Massachusetts Historical Society 61 (1927–28): 34–39.0
- "The Clipper Ships," in Albert Bushnell Hart (Ed.), Commonwealth History of Massachusetts. 5 vols. New York: State History Co., 1927–30: 4, 434–72. (Note: Reprinted in By Land and By Sea, pp. 27–65.)
- "Forcing the Dardanelles in 1810". New England Quarterly (1928): 208–25.
- "History". The History and Traditions of Harvard College. Cambridge, MA: Harvard Crimson, 1928.
- The India Ventures of Fisher Ames, 1794–1804. Proceedings of the American Antiquarian Society New Series 37: 14–23. 1928
- "John Adams and Thomas Jefferson," New England Society of Pennsylvania, 47th Annual Report 1928, 51–67. (Note: Reprinted in By Land and By Sea, pp. 219–30.)
- "Squire Ames and Doctor Ames". New England Quarterly I (1928): 5–31. (Note: Reprinted in By Land and By Sea, pp. 200–218, without notes.)
- "Henry Dunster, First President of Harvard College". Harvard Alumni Bulletin 31 (1928–29): 335–98.
- "Two 'Signers' on Salaries and the Stage". Proceedings of the Massachusetts Historical Society 62 (1928–29): 55–64.
- "Elbridge Gerry, Gentleman–Democrat". New England Quarterly 2 (1929): 6–33. (Note: Reprinted in By Land and By Sea, 181–99, without notes.)
- "Notes from Maine". American Speech 4 (1929): 356.
- "Ragusa". Proceedings of the Hellenic Travellers' Club (1929): 145–57.
- "Jottings on John Harvard". Harvard Alumni Bulletin 32 (1929–30): 574–79.
- "Remarks" on Charles E. Banks, "Persecution as a Factor in Emigration [of the Puritans]". Proceedings of the Massachusetts Historical Society 63 (1929–30): 151–54.

1930s

- "The Autobiography of Thomas Shepherd with Introduction and Bibliography". Publications of the Colonial Society of Massachusetts 27 (1930): 345–400.
- "History, 1838–1929," with Ephraim Emerson, Samuel Eliot Morison (editor), The Development of Harvard College Since the Inauguration of President Eliot. Cambridge, MA: Harvard University Press, 1930.
- "Sir Charles Firth and Master Hugh Peter, with a Hugh Peter Bibliography". Harvard Graduates' Magazine 39 (December 1930): 121–40.
- "Edward Channing: A Memoir". Proceedings of the Massachusetts Historical Society 64 (1930–32): 250–84. (Note: Reprinted in By Land and By Sea, 299–327.)
- "William Pynchon, the Founder of Springfield". Proceedings of the Massachusetts Historical Society 64 (1930–32): 67–107.
- "Review of E.F. Gray's Lief Eriksson". With F.S. Crowley. New England Quarterly 4 (1931): 554–60.
- "Those Misunderstood Puritans". The Forum 85 (March 1931): 142–47.
- "The Course of the Arbella from Cape Sable to Salem". Publications of the Colonial Society of Massachusetts 27 (1932): 285–306.
- "The Great Rebellion in Harvard College and the Resignation of President Kirkland". Publications of the Colonial Society of Massachusetts 27 (1932): 54–112.
- "The Plantation of Nasaway––An Industrial Experiment". Publications of the Colonial Society of Massachusetts 27 (1932): 204–22.
- "Washington, the Man and His Fame". Quebec 7 (1932): 47, 69–70.
- "Academic Seniority in Colonial Harvard". Harvard Alumni Bulletin 25 (1932–33): 576–78.
- "Harvard Degree Diplomas". Harvard Alumni Bulletin 25 (1932–33): 804–13, 907.
- "Francis Bowen, An Early Test of Academic Freedom in Massachusetts". Proceedings of the Massachusetts Historical Society 65 (1932–36): 597–611.
- "Harvard Seals and Arms". Harvard Graduates' Magazine 43 (1933): 1–13.
- "Medicine at Harvard in the Seventeenth Century". Harvard Medical Alumni Bulletin (October 1933).
- "Nathaniel Eaton, First Head of Harvard College". Harvard Graduates' Magazine 61 (1933): 127–42.
- "Needlework Picture Representing a Colonial College Building". Old–Time New England 24 (1933): 67–72.
- "Precedence at Harvard College in the Seventeenth Century" Proceedings of the American Antiquarian Society New Series 42: 371–431. 1933
- "Virginians and Marylanders at Harvard College in the Seventeenth Century". William & Mary College Quarterly Historical Magazine 2d ser. 13 (1933): 1–9.
- "Harvard 'Firsts' and Honorary Degrees". Harvard Alumni Bulletin 36 (1933–34): 1011–12.
- "The Pennoyer Scholarship". Harvard Alumni Bulletin 36 (1933–34): 660–62.
- "The Harvard School of Astronomy in the Seventeenth Century". New England Quarterly 7 (1934): 3–24.
- "Mistress Glover's Household Furnishings at Cambridge, Massachusetts, 1638–1641". Old–Time New England 25 (1934): 29–32.
- "Exhibition of Virginiana in the Widener Library Treasure Room". Harvard Alumni Bulletin 37 (1934–35): 197–99.
- "Harvard and Academic Oaths". Harvard Alumni Bulletin 37 (1934–35): 682–86.
- "The Education of Thomas Parker of Newbury". Publications of the Colonial Society of Massachusetts 28 (1935): 261–67.
- "The Library of George Alcock, Medical Student, 1676". Publications of the Colonial Society of Massachusetts 28 (1935): 350–57.
- "Dunster, Harper and Academic Freedom". Harvard Alumni Bulletin 38 (1935–36): 1206–09.
- "Harvard's Past". Harvard Alumni Bulletin 38 (1935–36): 265–74; The Tercentenary of Harvard College 47–62. (Note: Reprinted in By Land and By Sea, pp. 250–64.)
- "The Yard in 1811–1812 and the Old College Pump". With J. Dellinger Barney. Harvard Alumni Bulletin 38 (1935–36): 534–38.
- "The History of Universities". The Rice Institute Pamphlet 23 (1936): 211–82.
- "Harvard College Records" (Introduction). Publications of the Colonial Society of Massachusetts 31 (1936): 9–17, 279–89, 303–6, 325–26, 405–7.
- "Old School and College Books in the Prince Library". More Books 11 (1936): 77–93.
- "Three Oathless Centuries in Massachusetts". Massachusetts Law Quarterly (April 1936).
- "Address at the Tercentenary Celebration". Harvard Alumni Bulletin 39 (1936–37): 13–15; The Tercentenary of Harvard College, 196–99.
- "The 1836 Flags". Harvard Alumni Bulletin 39 (1936–37): 624–26.
- "Historical Register of Harvard University, 1636–1936". Harvard Alumni Bulletin 39 (1936–37): 565–68.
- "Report on Contents of Package Sealed September 8, 1836 and Opened September 8, 1936". Harvard Alumni Bulletin 39 (1936–37): 370–77.
- "Senior Alumnus, Senior Graduate, and Oldest Living Graduate". Harvard Alumni Bulletin 39 (1936–37): 847–49.
- "Tribute to Albert Bushnell Hart". Proceedings of the Massachusetts Historical Society 66 (1936–41): 434–38.
- "The Colonial Rectors of Trinity Church". Trinity Life (Lent 1937): 31–53.
- "The Letter–Book of Hugh Hall". Publications of the Colonial Society of Massachusetts 32 (1937): 514–21.
- "The Reverend Seaborn Cotton's Commonplace Book". Publications of the Colonial Society of Massachusetts 32 (1937): 350–52.
- "The Columbia's Winter Quarters of 1791–92 Located". Oregon Historical Quarterly 39 (1938): 3–7.
- "Discovering the Great Discoverer". New York Times Magazine (9 October 1938): 6–7, 23–26.
- "An American University Quartercentenary". Harvard Alumni Bulletin 51 (1938–39): 40–47.
- "Summer Costume of Harvard Students a Century Ago". Harvard Alumni Bulletin 51 (1938–39): 550.
- "Cruising Hints for the West Indies". Yachting 65 (January–February 1939).
- "Life Resails Columbus's Routes". Life 6 (25 March 1939): 102–06.
- "Texts and Translations of the Journal of Columbus's First Voyage". Hispanic American Historical Review 19 (1939): 235–61.
- "Reports on the Harvard Columbus Expedition". Harvard Alumni Bulletin 42–43 (1939–41). (Note: Reprinted in By Land and By Sea, pp. 99–123.)

1940s

- "Charles Morton (1627–98)". Publications of the Colonial Society of Massachusetts (1940): vii–xxix. Introduction to Society's reprint of Morton's Compendium Physicae.
- "Route of Columbus Along the North Coast of Haiti, and the Site of Navidad". Transactions of the American Philosophical Society n.s., 31 (1940): 239–85.
- "Columbus and Polaris". American Neptune 1 (1941): 6–25, 123–37.
- "Review of V. Stefansson's Ultima Thule". Hispanic American Historical Review 21 (1941): 452–56.
- "Capt. Codman on the Mutiny in Dorchester Church and the Seamanship of St. Paul". American Neptune 2 (1942): 99–106.
- "The Colonial Policy of Columbus". Bulletin of the Pan American Union 76 (1942): 543–55.
- "Introduction to the Commonplace Book of Joseph Green, 1675–1715". Publications of the Colonial Society of Massachusetts 34 (1943): 191–96.
- "The Landing at Fedhala, Morocco, November 8, 1942". American Neptune 3 (1943): 99–105; American Foreign Service Journal 2 (1943): 113–16, 156–57. (Note: Reprinted in Sailor Historian, pp. 203–209.)
- "Historical Notes on the Gilbert and Marshall Islands". American Neptune 4 (1944): 87–118; Life (22 May 1944): 90–96+. (Note: Reprinted in By Land and By Sea, pp. 124–57, without notes.)
- "Memoir of Vice Admiral Theodore S. Wilkinson USN". Alumni Horae Scholasticae 26 (1946): 33–38.
- "The Henry–Crillon Affair of 1812". Proceedings of the Massachusetts Historical Society 49 (1947–50): 207–31. (Note: Reprinted in By Land and By Sea, pp. 265–86, without notes.)
- "Did Roosevelt Start the War? History Through a Beard". Atlantic Monthly 182 (August 1948): 91–97. (Note: Reprinted in By Land and By Sea, pp. 328–45.)
- "Notes on Writing Naval (not Navy) English". American Neptune 9 (1949): 5–10.

1950s

- "Columbus As A Navigator". Studi Colombiani 2 (1951).
- "Faith of a Historian". American Historical Review 56 (1951): 261–75. (Note: Re printed in By Land and By Sea, 346–59.)
- "Prelude to Independence. The Virginia Resolution of May 15, 1776". William & Mary Quarterly 3d ser., 8 (1951): 483–92.
- "Two Minutes That Changed the Pacific War". New York Times Magazine 10 (1 June 1952): 10, 44–47.
- "Sir Winston Churchill, Nobel Prize Winner". Saturday Review 36 (31 October 1953): 22–23; Saturday Review Gallery (New York: Simon & Schuster, 1959): 413–18. (Note: Reprinted in Sailor Historian, pp. 377–82.)
- "Address at a Meeting in Sanders Theatre 27 May, Honoring Harvard Authorities for Defense of Academic Freedom". The Churchman (July 1954): 6–7.
- "The Plymouth Colony and Virginia". Virginia Magazine of History & Biography 62 (1954): 147–65.
- "Plymouth Colony Beachhead". United States Naval Institute Proceedings 80, no. 12 (December 1954): 1345–57.
- "The Formation of the Massachusetts Constitution". Massachusetts Law Quarterly 40 (December 1955): 1–17.
- "The Sea in Literature". Atlantic Monthly 196 (September 1955): 67–71.
- "The Battle That Set Us Free". Saturday Evening Post 229 (7 July 1956): 32–33, 56–59.
- "Christophe Colomb et le Portugal". Boletim de Sociedade de Geografia de Lisboa (1956): 269–78.
- "How to Read Moby Dick". Life 40 (26 June 1956): 57–68.
- "The 66–Day Saga of Mayflower I". New York Times Magazine 28 (14 April 1957): 42–49.
- "Prescott: The American Thucydides". Atlantic Monthly 200 (Nov. 1957): 165–72. (Note: Reprinted in Sailor Historian, pp. 343–55.)
- "Review of George W. Pierson's History of Yale". New England Quarterly 30 (1957): 396–402.
- "The Arms and Seals of John Paul Jones". American Neptune 18 (1958): 301–305.
- "Elba Interlude". Military Affairs 21 (1958): 182–87.
- "The Battle of Surigao Strait". United States Naval Institute Proceedings 84, no. 12 (December 1958): 31–53.
- "The Harvard Presidency". New England Quarterly 31 (1958): 435–46.
- "New Light Wanted on the Old Colony". William & Mary Quarterly 3d ser., 15 (1958): 359–64.
- "The Centenary of Prescott's Death". New England Quarterly 32 (1959): 243–48.
- "Greatest Voyage Ever Made". Saturday Evening Post 231 (3 October 1959): 42–43, 148–53.
- "The Mayflower's Destination and the Pilgrim Fathers' Patents". Publications of the Colonial Society of Massachusetts 38 (1959): 357–413.
- "The Real John Paul Jones". Saturday Evening Post 231 (1 August 1959): 26–27, 55–57.
- "The Willie Jones–John Paul Jones Tradition". William & Mary Quarterly 3d ser., 16 (1959): 198–206.

1960s

- "Reminiscences of Charles Eliot Norton". New England Quarterly 38 (1960): 364–68. (Note: Reprinted in Sailor Historian, pp. 409–13.)
- "Why Japan Surrendered: Excerpt from American Navy in World War II". Atlantic Monthly 206 (October 1960): 41–47.
- "American Strategy in the Pacific Ocean". Oregon Historical Quarterly 62 (1961): 5–56.
- "Lessons of Pearl Harbor". Saturday Evening Post 234 (28 October 1961): 19–27.
- "Peace Convention of February 1961". Proceedings of the Massachusetts Historical Society 73 (1961): 58–80. (Note: Reprinted in Vistas of History, pp. 125–58, without notes.)
- "Wisdom of Benjamin Franklin". Saturday Evening Post 234 (21 January 1961): 21, 76–78. (Note: Reprinted in Vistas of History, pp. 106–124.)
- "Death of a Kennedy". Look 16 (27 February 1962): 105–112.
- "Guadalcanal". Saturday Evening Post 235 (28 July 1962): 22–23, 62–65.
- "Mr. Lincoln Attends Church". Maryland Historical Magazine 57 (March 1962): 47–55.
- "Pacific Strategy". Marine Corps Gazette 46 (August 1962): 34–40, (September 1962): 34–39.
- "The Principles and Experiences of an Historian". Speech delivered to the Fondation Internationale Balzan in Rome, Italy, 19 May 1963.
- "The Roosevelt Collection of Naval Art". United States Naval Institute Proceedings 89 (November 1963): 81–96.
- "Six Minutes That Changed the World". American Heritage 14 (February 1963): 50–55, 102–103.
- "Augustus Peabody Loring, Jr". Publications of the Colonial Society of Massachusetts 42 (1964).
- "In Memorium: Perry Miller". New England Quarterly 37 (1964).
- "John Fitzgerald Kennedy". Atlantic Monthly 213 (February 1964): 47–49.
- "The Dry Salvages and the Thacher Shipwreck". American Neptune 25 (1965): 233–247.
- "PPA Press Conference Summary". Publishers World 187 (22 March 1965): 41–43.
- "Sons of Liberty". Reader's Digest 87 (November 1965): 281–286.
- "Arthur Meier Schlesinger" Proceedings of the American Antiquarian Society New Series 76: 227–30. 1967
- "Commodore Perry's Japan Expedition Press and Shipboard Theatre" Proceedings of the American Antiquarian Society New Series 77: 35–43. 1967
- "Our Most Unpopular War". Proceedings of the Massachusetts Historical Society 80 (1968): 38–54. (Note: Reprinted in Dissent in Three American Wars. Cambridge, MA: Harvard University Press, 1970.)
- "Thoughts on Naval Strategy, World War II". Naval War College Review 20 (March 1968): 3–10.

1970s

- "John Cabot, The Mysterious Sailor Whose Voyages Laid the Basis for English Claims to North America". Smithsonian 2 (April 1971): 12–20.
- "Publishers World Interviews Samuel Eliot Morison". Publishers World 206 (4 November 1974): 6–7.
- "Abigail Adams". Smithsonian 6 (October 1975): 96–97.
- "The Finding Fathers: Which European Discovered America?" European Community No. 192 (January–February 1976): 4–13. (Note: Reprinted in Sailor Historian, pp. 14–31.)

== Additional writings ==
- Dictionary of American Biography. American Council of Learned Societies. New York: C. Scribner's sons, 1928–36. For this dictionary, Morison wrote the following biographical articles:
  - "Fisher Ames" (vol. 1, pp. 244–46)
  - "Benjamin Austin" (vol. 1, pp. 431–42)
  - "Peter Chardon Brooks" (vol. 3, p. 83)
  - "George Cabot" (vol. 3, pp. 395–96)
  - "Arthur Hamilton Clark" (vol. 4, pp. 120–21)
  - "Stephen Day" (vol. 5, p. 163)
  - "Elbridge Gerry" (vol. 7, pp. 222–27)
  - "Albert Bushnell Hart", Supplement 3 (1973), pp. 335–38
  - "John Harvard" (vol. 8, pp. 371–72)
  - "Leonard Hoard" (vol. 9, pp. 85–89)
  - "Edward Johnson" (vol. 10, p. 95)
  - "John Thornton Kirkland" (vol. 10, p. 431)
  - "John Leverett" (vol. 10, pp. 197–98)
  - "Jonathan Loring" (vol. 13, pp. 79–81)
  - "Donald McKay" (vol. 13, pp. 72–73)
  - "Urian Oakes" (vol. 13, pp. 602–03)
  - "Harrison Gray Otis" (vol. 14, pp. 98–100)
  - "James Otis" (vol. 14, pp. 101–105)
  - "Thomas Parker" (vol. 14, pp. 241–42)
  - "William Pynchon" (vol. 15, pp. 292–93)
  - "Josiah Quincy" (vol. 15, pp. 308–11)
  - "Jared Sparks" (vol. 17, pp. 430–34)
  - "Squanto" (vol. 17, p. 487)
  - "Theodore Stark Wilkinson", Supplement 4 (1974), pp. 895–96.
