= Wladimir Guedroitz =

- Владимир Цезаревич Гедройц
- Born: 1873; Tver, Tver Governorate, Russian Empire
- Died: 1941 (aged 67–68); Courbevoie, Île-de-France, France
- Spouse: Olga Nicolaevna Karmaline (1895–1941)
- Children: 3
- Relatives: Alexis Guedroitz (Grandson)

Prince Wladimir Cesarevich Guedroitz (Russian: Владимир Цезаревич Гедройц; 1873 – 1941) was Chamberlain of the Imperial Court of Russia, Actual State Councilor and Chairman of the Control Commission of the Russian Empire.

== Biography ==
Prince Wladimir Guedroitz was born in Tver, Tver Governorate (Russia) in 1873 and died in Courbevoie (France) in 1941.

He married in Saint Petersburg (1895) Olga Nicolaevna Karmaline (Drivan (Lithuania) 1872 + Courbevoie (France) 1941) who was the daughter of General Nicholas Nicholaevich Karmaline and his wife born Lubov Ivanovna Belenitzine.

From this union were born three sons: Prince Nicholas Wladimirovich Guedroitz (Saint Petersburg (Russia) 1896 + Kórós (Hungary) 1923), Prince Michael Wladimirovich Guedroitz (Saint Petersburg (Russia) 1899 + Biarritz (France) 1966) and Prince Alexis Wladimirovich Guedroitz (Saint Petersburg (Russia) 1904 and 1918).

Prince Wladimir Guedroitz was the grandfather of professor and interpreter Alexis Guedroitz.

== See also ==
- Russian Biographical Dictionary
- Giedroyć
