= Stella Does Tricks =

1996 British film

- Directed by: Coky Giedroyc
- Written by: A. L. Kennedy
- Produced by: Adam Barker
- Starring: Kelly Macdonald; James Bolam; Hans Matheson; Ewan Stewart
- Cinematography: Barry Ackroyd
- Edited by: Budge Tremlett
- Music by: Nick Bicat
- Distributed by: British Film Institute
- Release date: 30 January 1998 (UK)
- Running time: 97 minutes
- Country: United Kingdom
- Language: English
- Budget: £650,000
- Box office: £32,966 (UK)

Stella Does Tricks is a 1996 British drama film about a young Glaswegian girl, played by Kelly Macdonald, working as a prostitute in London.

The film was the first feature film directed by Coky Giedroyc, inspired by her previous work making documentaries about homeless people in Glasgow, Manchester, and London, and provided Macdonald with her first film role after Trainspotting. The film has been described as "an uncompromisingly feminist text, in which the Baby Doll turns Avenger", and by Lawrence van Gelder of The New York Times as a "bleak, perceptive portrait of the prostitute as a young girl torn between the need for genuine love and a career of sexual exploitation".

Despite the film centering on the lives of female prostitutes, the only nudity in the film is male nudity.

The screenplay was written by the novelist A. L. Kennedy, and draws in part on one of her earlier stories, Friday Payday. Cinematography was by frequent Ken Loach collaborator Barry Ackroyd.

== Plot ==
Stella is one of a number of young prostitutes working for the pimp Mr. Peters in London, having run away from her Glasgow home where she was sexually abused by her father, a stand-up comedian. She tries to get away from Peters and becomes involved with Eddie, a heroin addict, before taking her revenge on Peters and her father.

== Cast ==
- Kelly Macdonald as Stella
- James Bolam as Mr. Peters
- Hans Matheson as Eddie
- Ewan Stewart as Francis
- Andy Serkis as Fitz
