= Porches Pottery =

Porches Pottery is a producer of hand-painted pottery in the town of Porches, in the Algarve region of Portugal. The pottery style was founded in 1968 by artists Patrick Swift and Lima de Freitas, in order to revive a traditional Algarve pottery industry. Swift and de Freitas chose Porches for its history as a pottery centre, dating back for many centuries, and for its clay pits.

== History ==
The origins of Porches Pottery date to the early 1960s, when Irish artist Patrick Swift first came to the Algarve and encountered a region with a system of commerce and production based around craft activities that had changed little since the Middle Ages. Potters faced difficulty competing with modern plastic and metal wares that had entered the market. In his book, Algarve: a portrait and a guide (1965), Swift noted the decline of quality pottery: "All the basic dishes were of the local Lagoa pottery — easily breakable and poorly glazed. But aesthetically pleasing and so cheap that breakages were no tragedy. Replacements after all helped to encourage an industry threatened with extinction. Even now some of the nicer old kitchen objects can no longer be obtained at the pottery. ‘People don’t buy them anymore’, say the potters, ‘so we’ve stopped making them.’"

Swift was motivated to revive the craft and prove that the traditional craft-based form of socio-economic production, that had existed throughout Europe until the Industrial revolution, could be successful in the modern world. Swift envisioned creating an arts & crafts centre where traditional craftspeople could sell their goods. He was soon joined by Portuguese artist Lima de Freitas. Swift said, on Lisbon, "My reason for meeting Lima on this occasion was not to talk about art. It was something much stranger stemming from our basically sympathetic view points, we had embarked on a scheme so foolhardy that, looking back on it, I do not know how we had the temerity to start. This was nothing less than to try and resuscitate the local pottery industry in our part of Algarve."

To realize the venture, the two artists first approached the potter, Gregório Rodrigues, who agreed to work with them (his son, Fernando Rodrigues, worked alongside him at PorchesPottery). Swift purchased common oxides from the local hardware store, constructed a wood-burning kiln and proceeded to decorate Gregório's pots. The initial results were not successful, but they sought professional technical advice from ceramists in Lisbon and acquired an efficient kiln. Their workshop was a small 17th-century farmhouse, today a ceramics workshop called Olaria Pequena. The pottery was soon relocated to a larger building, designed by Swift, a little further down the EN125 on the western outskirts of Porches. They trained local people in the mastered control of the brush, painting freely and directly onto tin glaze in the traditional majolica technique.

== About the pottery ==
Craft: Porches Pottery produces majolica, which is tin-glazed earthenware. The technique is thought to have originated in Persia, though was well established in Mesopotamia by the 9th century, where it became an alternative to the much esteemed porcelain that was beginning to appear in China. Introduced into Europe by the Moors, Iberia became famous as a centre of excellence for this type of pottery, which, due to its popular appeal, was soon spread throughout the rest of Europe.

Style: The two artists researched the designs and motifs of ancient pottery, visiting museums throughout Europe, until finally some basic patterns began to emerge as being typical of the influences imposed by past civilisations that had once dominated the Algarve. These designs include the various animals, flowers and foliage that have become associated with Porches Pottery.

Pottery: Swift designed the building that houses Porches Pottery to resemble a 17th-century farmhouse. (In Porches he also designed the interior of a 17th-century building, which he helped restore, which today is the O Leão de Porches restaurant; the original building and entrance to the International School of the Algarve, which he was instrumental in founding; the stations of the cross at the Igreja Matriz (Porches), where he is buried.)

The building has an adjoining café, Bar Bacchus, which is decorated with tiles painted by Swift. There is an outside eating area decorated with tiles designed by Swift's late daughter, Katherine Swift, who managed the pottery following her father's death. The pottery is still run by the Swift family. Porches Pottery's role in the revival of the regional craft has been recognised.

== Bibliography and external links ==
- Porches Pottery website
- Olaria Algarve Porches Pottery: The First Fifty Years, Olariamajolica Swift Lda., 2018 (ISBN 978-989-54201-0-0) by Paul Bond and Brian Fortune
- Patrick Swift: An Irish Painter In Portugal, Gandon Editions, 2001 (ISBN 0-946846-75-8); contributions by Fernando de Azvedo (painter and President of Sociedade de Bellas Artes, Lisbon), Brian Fallon (chief arts critic to The Irish Times for 35 years) and Peter Murray (curator and director of the Crawford Gallery, Cork)
- Patrick Swift 1927–83 Retrospective Catalogue, Irish Museum of Modern Art, 1993 (ISBN 1-873654-12-X ); essays on Swift by Anthony Cronin (poet) and Aidan Dunne (art critic).
- Introduction to Swift's Crawford Municipal Art Gallery Exhibition (2001) by Richard Morphet (Keeper Tate Britain 1986–1998) link
