= Motiejus Giedraitis =

Lithuanian nobleman (c. 1545 – 1621)

Motiejus or Matas Giedraitis (1480 or 1490 – 1563) was a Lithuanian noble statesman, diplomat, and writer of the Grand Duchy of Lithuania.

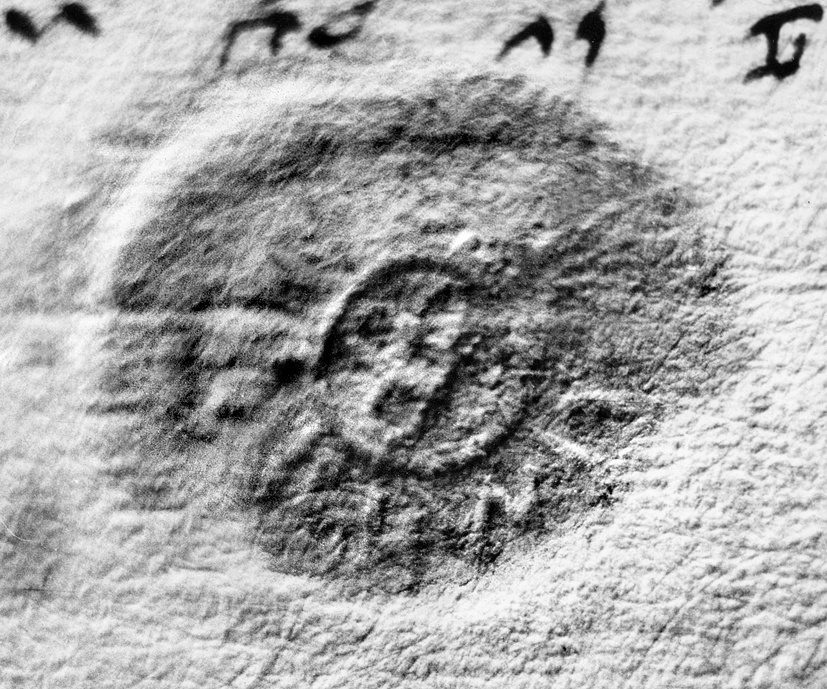
Seal of Motiejus Giedraitis

== Biography ==
A member of the Videniškiai branch of the House of Giedroyć, Giedraitis was born in 1480 or 1490 to Baltramiejus Vaitkevičius Giedraitis. The family sometimes called themselves the Daumantai, due to a local nobleman who lived in the area in the 14th century. From 1507, Giedraitis was starost of Kernavė and Maišiagala. In 1547 he inherited his grandfather's estate in Vilnius. Having close ties with the court of Bona Sforza, Giedraitis was his family's flag bearer from 1577, and vicegerent of Vilnius from 1560. In 1562 Giedraitis became the Marszałek of the palace of the Grand Duke of Lithuania. Around the Videniškiai Manor, he built a residential homestead, as well as the village's first wooden church (which was assigned to the Vilnius Dominicans in 1549), a brick castle, and the main town of Videniškiai. In 1551 Giedraitis was an envoy to the Tsardom of Russia. He wrote of his travel and diplomatic experience in De modo recipendi oratores apud Moscavitas (About the Way to Receive Messengers at the Muscovites). It was partially printed in Olaus Magnus's A Description of the Northern Peoples. There was also a genealogy of the Giedraičiai family published in Maciej Stryjkowski's chronicle.

== Family ==
It is believed that Giedraitis's first wife was Ona Krošinska, with whom he had five sons: the Samogitian bishop Merkelis Giedraitis, statesman Martynas Marcelis Giedraitis, podkomorzy of Kaunas Kasparas Giedraitis, and Zigmantas Giedraitis. His second wife was Sofija Narbutaitė (married in 1556). They had an estate near the Bernardinai monastery. Giedraitis's family line survives to this day.
