= Antanas Giedraitis =

Polish-Lithuanian geologist (1848–1909)

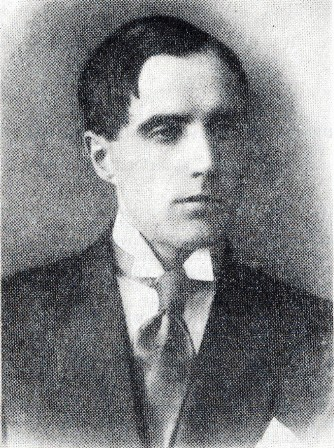
In 1869

Antanas Karolis Giedraitis or Antony Karol Giedroyc (Polish form) (21 February 1848 – 26 October 1909) was a Polish-Lithuanian geologist and nobleman. He produced the first large scale geological map of the Quaternary formations of the Lithuanian region.

Giedraitis was born in Karvis Manor (near Maišiagala) in the noble Giedraitis family which had held the title of duke from the 15th century. His father Edmund had graduated from the University of Dorpat in 1834. After studying at the Vilnius gymnasium, he went to the Freiburg Mining Academy but his studies were interrupted by family circumstances. He finally completed his studies at the University of Dorpat from where he graduated in 1877.

He then began to examine the geology of Lithuania, Belarus and northern Poland. He joined the Russian Geological Committee in 1883 and was involved in surveys in the Amu Darya region and in Turkmenistan. He was also involved in surveys for the Trans-Siberian Railway. In 1895, he produced a map of the chalk formations of the Lithuanian region.

In 1900, he became a teacher at the mining school in Yekaterinoslav and worked for three years before poor health made him return home. His later life is largely unknown. His son Antanas (1892–1966) was deported by the Soviets to Siberia and moved to England.
