= Bomel =

- Village of Namur
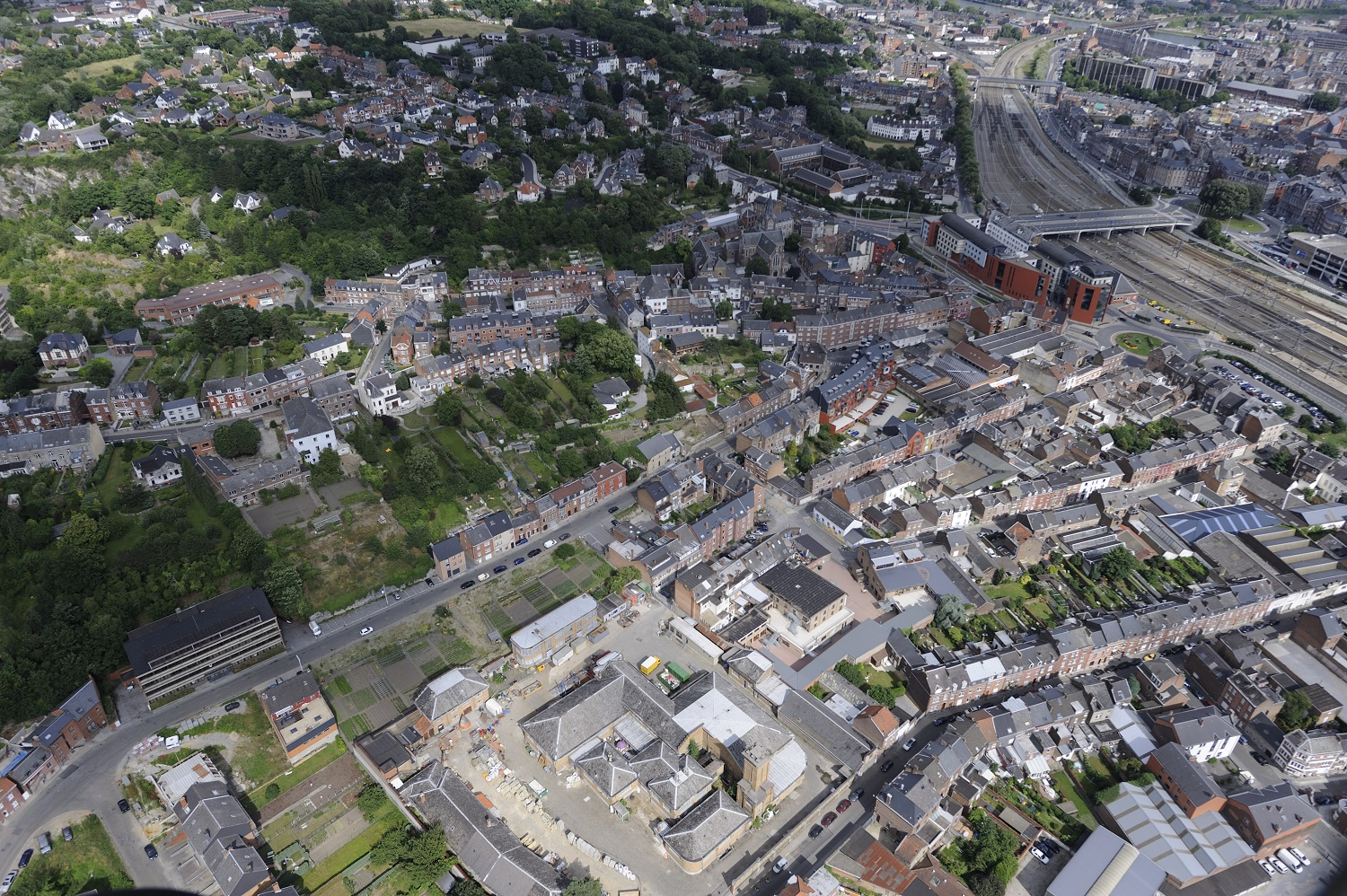
- Interactive map of Bomel
- Location within Belgium Location within Namur Province
- Coordinates: 50°28′16″N 4°51′58″E
- Country: Belgium
- Community: French Community
- Region: Wallonia
- Province: Namur
- Arrondissement: Namur
- Municipality: Namur
- Postal codes: 5000
- Area codes: 081

Bomel (French pronunciation: [bɔmɛl]) is a borough of the city of Namur, Wallonia. It is located behind the Namur railway station and limited by the slopes that rise to the north of Namur. The space it occupies is triangular area bounded by the valley of the Arquet to the east and the valley of the Houyoux west and the city centre of Namur to the south.

== Architecture ==
=== Les Abattoirs de Bomel (1946) ===
Built between 1939 and 1946, the Slaughterhouse of Bomel was entirely restored by Emmanuel Bouffioux's architectural firm BAEB in 2014. The Abattoirs de Bomel now houses a Cultural Centre.

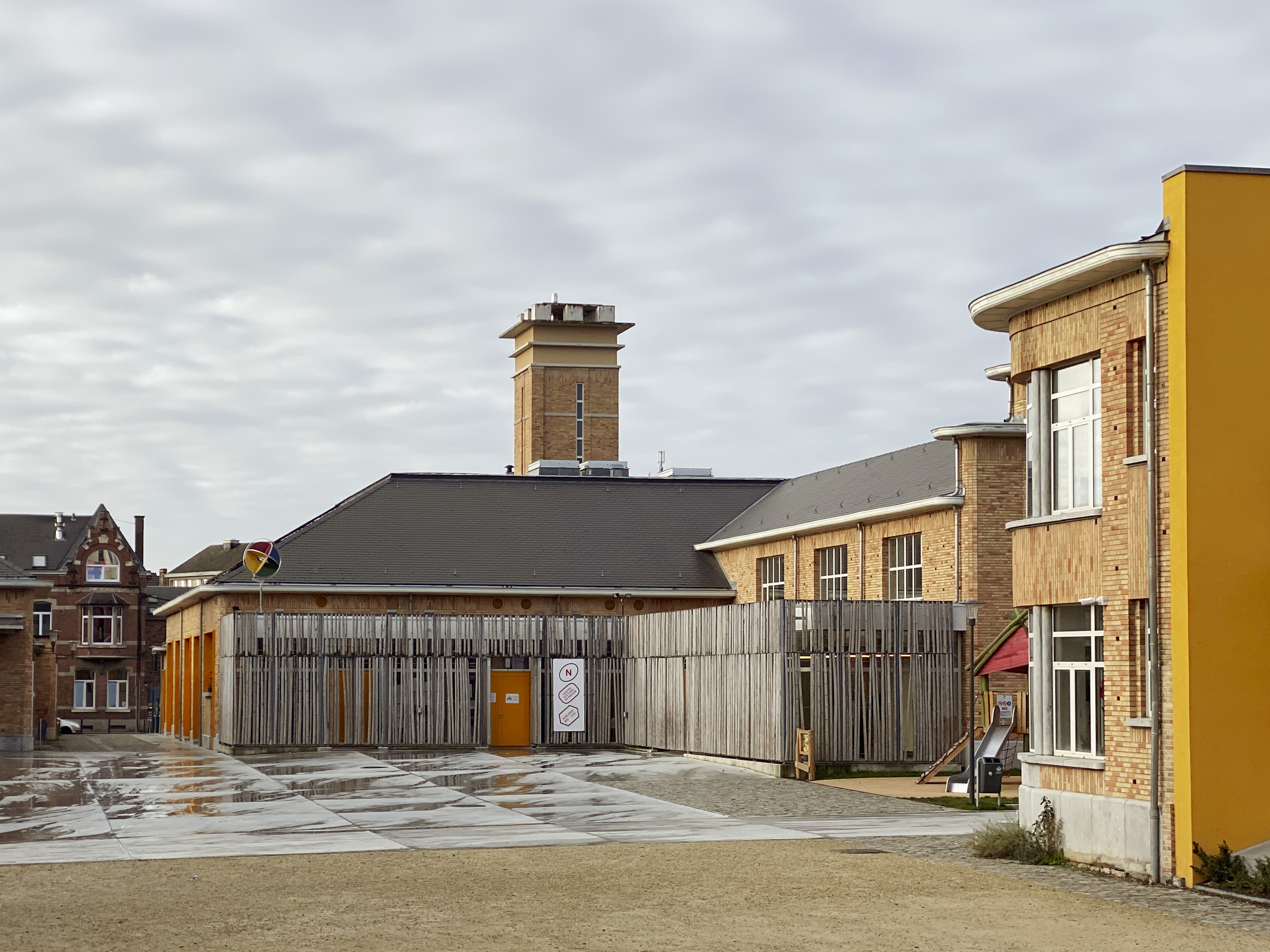
Les Abattoirs de Bomel (The Slaughterhouse of Bomel).
