= List of protected heritage sites in La Bruyère, Belgium =

This table shows an overview of the protected heritage sites in the Walloon town La Bruyère, Belgium. This list is part of Belgium's national heritage.

Object	Year/architect	Town/section	Address	Coordinates	Number^{?}	Image
Tower of the church of Saint-Denis ^{(nl)} ^{(fr)}		La Bruyère	Saint-Denis	50.535459°N 4.784278°E	92141-CLT-0003-01 Info	Toren van de kerk Saint-Denis
Two pillories located on the grounds of the castle of Villers-lez-Heest and the ensemble of the castle and its surroundings, the park and pillories ^{(nl)} ^{(fr)}		La Bruyère		50.531485°N 4.840600°E	92141-CLT-0004-01 Info	
Parish rectory of Saint-Didier and its wall (running up to the school, and extending a bit beyond that) and the ensemble of the surrounding land and parsonage ^{(nl)} ^{(fr)}		La Bruyère		50.505210°N 4.803616°E	92141-CLT-0005-01 Info	
Exterior of the castle of Villers-lez-Heest, the farm, the outbuildings, the pavilion, and the walls of the canal, the hangar and the bakery ^{(nl)} ^{(fr)}		La Bruyère		50.531153°N 4.841897°E	92141-CLT-0006-01 Info	

== See also ==
- List of protected heritage sites in Namur (province)
- La Bruyère, Belgium
