= House of Giedroyć =

Polish–Lithuanian aristocratic family

Giedroyć Giedraitis / Гедройц / Guedroitz
- Coat of arms of the Giedraitis
- Country: Grand Duchy of Lithuania
- Founded: 13th century
- Founder: Giedrius
- Estate: Giedraičiai

The House of Giedroyć (Polish pronunciation: [ˈɡʲɛdrɔjtɕ]; Lithuanian: Giedraitis; Russian: Гедройц; French: Guedroitz) is an aristocratic clan and family which traces its origins to the Grand Duchy of Lithuania and the Polish–Lithuanian Commonwealth. According to the 16th century Lithuanian Chronicle, they are descendants of Prince Giedrius, a brother of Grand Duke Traidenis of Lithuania.

Many family members were important figures in Lithuanian, Polish, Russian, French and British history or culture.

The family's original domain was the Lithuanian town of Giedraičiai.

== Notable members ==
- Michał Giedroyć (1420–1485), Augustinian friar
- Merkelis Giedraitis (1536–1609), Bishop of Samogitia
- Romuald Giedroyć (1750–1824), Commander of the allied Lithuanian regiments of Napoleon's Grande Armée
- Vera Gedroitz (1870–1932), Russian military surgeon
- Konstantin Gedroits (1872–1932), Russian soil scientist
- Wladimir Guedroitz (1873–1941), Chamberlain of the Imperial Court of Russia
- Jerzy Giedroyc (1906–2000), Polish writer and political activist
- Alexis Guedroitz (1923–1992), Professor of Russian Language and Literature
- Michal Giedroyc (1929–2017), Polish-Lithuanian-British aircraft designer
- Ania Guédroïtz (born 1949), Belgian actress
- Coky Giedroyc (born 1963), English film and television director (Sherlock)
- Jason Gedroic (Jason Gedrick, born 1965) American actor best known for his work on the television series Murder One and Boomtown, and the motion picture Iron Eagle
- Mel Giedroyc (born 1968), English presenter and comedian, best known for The Great British Bake Off

== See also ==
- Giedroyć
- Lithuanian nobility
