= Ania Guédroïtz =

Belgian actress

- Born: 15 January 1949 (age 77); Dublin, Ireland
- Education: Royal Conservatory of Brussels

Comedy career
- Genre: Classical theater

Ania Guédroïtz, née Princess Agnes Alexeievna Guedroitz on 15 January 1949 in Dublin, Ireland, is a Belgian actress.

== Biography ==
Ania Guédroïtz was born in Dublin, daughter of Prince Alexis Nicolaevich Guedroitz and Oonagh Ryan (Kathleen Ryan's sister).

She lived her childhood in Belgium with her father who was remarried. Educated in Brussels, she began studying drama at the Royal Conservatory, where she obtained a first prize "with great distinction" in 1972. In addition to French, her main language, she also studied Russian and English.

She then began a professional career in various theatres in Brussels. In 1973, she married the Belgian theater actor Jean-Claude Frison and had a son, Michaël Frison, born in 1974. The couple divorced in 1977.

She was made a Knight of the Order of Leopold II in 1992.

== Theater ==
=== Main roles ===
- 1971-1972: Agnès in L'École des femmes (The School for Wives) by Molière (Rideau de Bruxelles)
- 1972-1973: Marianne in Les Caprices de Marianne (The Moods of Marianne) by Alfred de Musset (Théâtre National de Belgique)
- 1976-1977: Mousseline in Mousseline by Louis Velle (Compagnie des Galeries)
- 1977-1978: Agnès in L'École des femmes by Molière (Compagnie des Galeries)
- 1977-1978: Isabelle in L'École des maris by Molière (Compagnie des Galeries)
- 1977-1978: Suzanneke in Le Mariage de Mademoiselle Beulemans by Fonson and Wicheler (Compagnie des Galeries)
- 1977-1978: Alison in Printemps à Rome ! (Avanti!) by Samuel Taylor (Compagnie des Galeries)
- 1979-1980: Nina in La Mouette (The Seagull) by Anton Chekhov (Compagnie des Galeries)
- 1989-1990: Sophie in Le jeu de l'Amour et de la Mort by Romain Rolland (Compagnie Yvan Baudouin)
- 1989-1990: Aglaé in L'Hurluberlu by Jean Anouilh (Théâtre Royal du Parc)
- 1991-1992: Denise in L'Eloignement by Loleh Bellon (Théâtre Royal du Parc)
- 1992-1993: Mathilde in Un caprice by Musset (Théâtre Royal du Parc)

=== Important supporting roles ===
- 1970-1971: Gnese in Il campiello by Carlo Goldoni (Rideau de Bruxelles)
- 1971-1972: Anémone in Cher Antoine by Jean Anouilh (Rideau de Bruxelles)
- 1971-1972: Isabelle in Le Menteur by Pierre Corneille (Rideau de Bruxelles)
- 1972-1973: Henriette in Les Femmes Savantes by Molière (Théâtre National de Belgique)
- 1972-1973: Mathilde in Les Fils du soleil by Christopher Hampton (Rideau de Bruxelles)
- 1972-1973: Lady Janet in Mangeront-ils ? by Victor Hugo (Théâtre National de Belgique)
- 1972-1973: Un témoin in Le Troisième Jour by Fodor (Comédie Claude Volter)
- 1974-1975: Henriette in Les Femmes savantes by Molière (Rideau de Bruxelles)
- 1974-1975: Iris in La guerre de Troie n'aura pas lieu (The Trojan War Will Not Take Place) by Jean Giraudoux (Rideau de Bruxelles)
- 1974-1975: Frida in Henri IV by Luigi Pirandello (Rideau de Bruxelles)
- 1975-1976: Polly in Lady pain d'épices (The Gingerbread Lady) by Neil Simon (Compagnie des Galeries)
- 1975-1976: Saby in Ne coupez pas mes arbres by William Douglas Home (Compagnie des Galeries)
- 1975-1976: Jacqueline in Oscar by Claude Magnier (Compagnie des Galeries)
- 1975-1976: Patricia in Une femme qui a le cœur trop petit by Fernand Crommelynck (Rideau de Bruxelles)
- 1976-1977: Marie-Rose in Harvey by Mary Chase (Compagnie des Galeries)
- 1976-1977: Ania in Les portes claquent by Michel Fermaud (Compagnie des Galeries)
- 1976-1977: Annick in Quarante carats by Barillet and Grédy (Compagnie des Galeries)
- 1977-1978: Olympia in Don Juan by Michel de Ghelderode (Compagnie des Galeries)
- 1977-1978: Gwendoline in Parodies (Travesties) by Tom Stoppard (Rideau de Bruxelles)
- 1978-1979: La princesse Nathalie in Le Prince de Hombourg by Kleist (Compagnie des Galeries)
- 1979-1980: Lucille in La Mort de Danton by Büchner (Compagnie des Galeries)
- 1979-1980: L'américaine in Oncle Sam by Victorien Sardou (Comédie Claude Volter)
- 1980-1981: Nancy in Le Cauchemar de Bella Manningham (Gaslight) by Patrick Hamilton (Compagnie des Galeries)
- 1988-1989: Mademoiselle Nina in La Vengeance d'une orpheline russe by Douanier Rousseau (Rideau de Bruxelles)
- 1990-1991: Marie in Le Retour au désert by Bernard-Marie Koltès (Rideau de Bruxelles)
- 1991-1992: Alix in Chaud et Froid by Crommelynck (Théâtre Royal du Parc)
- 1992-1993: Priscilla in Les Sanctuaires de Victoria Swann by René Lambert (Théâtre Royal du Parc)
- 1993-1994: Emma in Boule de Suif by Guy de Maupassant (Théâtre Royal du Parc)
- 1994-1995: Thea in Hedda Gabler by Henrik Ipsen (Théâtre Royal du Parc)
- 1995-1996: Marina in Les Rustres by Goldoni (Théâtre Royal du Parc)
- 1997-1998: Fina in Maître Puntila et son Valet Matti by Bertolt Brecht (Atelier Théâtre Jean Vilar)
- 1998-1999: Mariana in Tout est bien qui finit bien (All's Well That Ends Well) by William Shakespeare (Atelier Théâtre Jean Vilar)

== Filmography ==
=== Television ===
- 1973: Armande de Kersaint in the television series Rue de la Grande Truanderie directed by Jacques Vernel (RTBF)
- 1977: Agnès in the televised version of L'École des femmes (The School for Wives) de Molière at the Château de la Bruyère in Émines directed by Michel Rochat (RTBF)

=== DVD ===
- 1976: Les portes claquent - Box set "Christiane Lenain" (RTBF Editions, 2010)
- 1978: Le Mariage de Mademoiselle Beulemans - Box set (RTBF Editions, 2008)

=== Short film at the cinema ===
- 1992: "La riche" in Les Sept Péchés capitaux (1992 film) (The Seven Deadly Sins) directed by Pascal Zabus

== See also ==
- Giedroyć
