= The Nativity (TV series) =

2010 TV series

- Genre: Religious drama
- Written by: Tony Jordan
- Directed by: Coky Giedroyc
- Starring: Andrew Buchan; Tatiana Maslany; Neil Dudgeon; Claudie Blakley; Peter Capaldi; John Lynch
- Composer: Jonathan Goldsmith
- Countries of origin: United Kingdom; Morocco; Canada
- No. of episodes: 4

Production
- Producer: Ruth Kenley-Letts
- Running time: 30 minutes (approx.)
- Production companies: Red Planet Pictures; K Films; Temple Street Productions

Original release
- Network: BBC One; BBC HD
- Release: 20 December – 23 December 2010

Related
- The Passion

The Nativity is a 2010 British four-part drama television series. The series is a re-telling of the Nativity of Jesus and was broadcast on BBC One and BBC HD across four days, starting on 20 December 2010. It was rebroadcast in two hour-long parts on the mornings of 24 and 25 December 2011 and across four days starting on 19 December 2016.

The series stars Tatiana Maslany as Mary; Andrew Buchan as Joseph; Neil Dudgeon as Joachim; Claudie Blakley as Anna; Peter Capaldi as Balthasar; and John Lynch as Gabriel.

== Cast ==
- Tatiana Maslany as Mary
- Andrew Buchan as Joseph
- Neil Dudgeon as Joachim
- Peter Capaldi as Balthasar
- John Lynch as Gabriel
- Claudie Blakley as Anne
- Gawn Grainger as Levi
- Obi Abili as Gaspar
- Jack Shepherd as Melchior
- Al Weaver as Thomas
- Ruth Negga as Leah
- Howard Samuels as Tax Collector
- Ken Bones as Bethlehem Rabbi
- Frances Barber as Elizabeth
- Art Malik as Nicholas
- Vincent Regan as Herod
- David Sterne as Abimael
- Sadie Shimmin as Salome
- Helen Schlesinger as Rachel
- Matthew Deslippe as Innkeeper

== Production ==
Tony Jordan started writing the script in 2007. At the time, he did not believe in the Nativity story, but said that since writing The Nativity, his opinion changed. He was asked to produce the series after discussing new projects with BBC Wales in Cardiff, but his meeting got mixed up with another, where they wanted to create a follow-up to The Passion. Jordan was asked what he would do with the Nativity and he pitched what he called a "ridiculous notion" of a story centred on the Inn in Bethlehem, which he compared to the BBC 1980s sitcom 'Allo 'Allo!. Jordan forgot about the idea but received a telephone call from the BBC a week later asking him to produce a script.

Filming lasted a month and took place in Ouarzazate, Morocco. Capaldi, Shepherd and Abili almost missed filming due to air travel disruption after the 2010 eruptions of Eyjafjallajökull in Iceland.

== Reception ==
The first episode was watched by 5.21 million viewers, an audience share of 20.3%.

Sam Wollaston of The Guardian praised the series, saying: "[W]hat is nice about this new telling of an old story: it will resonate, and it's relevant. It's very human, too, because that's what it's about, the characters and what happens to them and between them, rather than the message. In short, it's not preachy, and that's a relief."

== See also ==
- List of Christmas films
