= Émines =

Émines Émene (Walloon)
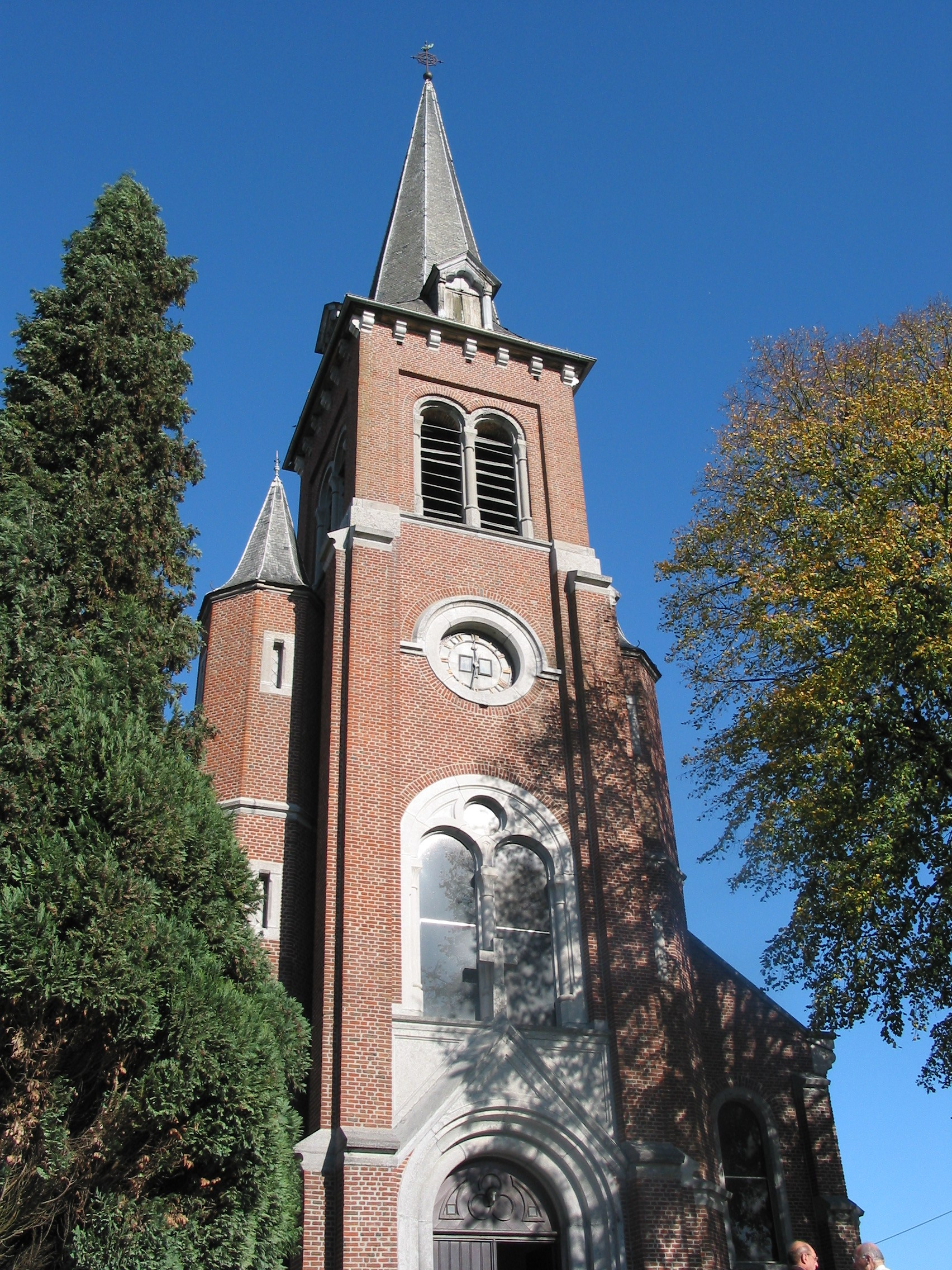
- St. Lambert church (1871) in Émines

- Location in Belgium
- Country: Belgium
- Region: Wallonia
- Province: Namur
- Municipality: La Bruyère

Area
  - Total: 10.56 km^{2} (4.08 sq mi)

Population (2008)
  - Total: 1,462
  - Density: 138.4/km^{2} (358.6/sq mi)
- Postal codes: 5080
- Area codes: 081

Émines (French pronunciation: [emin]; Walloon: Émene) is a village of Wallonia and a district of the municipality of La Bruyère, located in the province of Namur, Belgium.

It was a municipality in its own right before the fusion of Belgian municipalities in 1977.
