= Henrik Ipsen =

Danish footballer and coach (born 1973)

Personal information
- Date of birth: 30 June 1973 (age 53)
- Place of birth: Denmark
- Height: 1.87 m (6 ft 2 in)
- Position: Goalkeeper

Senior career*
Years	Team	Apps	(Gls)
1996–2005	Silkeborg IF	163	(0)
2006–2010	SønderjyskE	19	(0)
2010–2011	Vejle BK	1	(0)
Total		183	(0)

Managerial career
- 2010–2011: Vejle BK (playing goalkeeper coach)
- 2011–2015: FC Midtjylland (goalkeeper coach)
- 2016–2017: FC Nordsjælland (goalkeeper coach)
- * Club domestic league appearances and goals

Henrik Ipsen (born 30 June 1973) is a Danish professional football goalkeeper and later a goalkeeper coach.

== Honours ==
Silkeborg

- UEFA Intertoto Cup: 1996
- Danish Cup: 2000–01
