= Warisoulx =

Coordinates: 50°32′N 4°51′E

Warisoulx (Walloon: Waerijhoû) is a village of Wallonia and a district of the municipality of La Bruyère, located in the province of Namur, Belgium.

In December 2009, one half of an escaped prisoner duo from the city of Namur was recaptured in a Warisoulx barn.
