= Lima de Freitas =

Lima de Freitas

Lima de Freitas was a Portuguese painter, illustrator, ceramicist and writer. He studied at the Escola Superior de Belas Artes de Lisboa.

He illustrated over 100 books, most notably the Portuguese writer Aquilino Ribeiro's translation of Don Quixote. These illustrations were recently republished in a translation by Jose Bento (ed. Relógio D' Água, 2005). His work in ceramics includes 14 tile panels depicting Lisbon myths and legends which are displayed at the Rossio Railway Station in Lisbon .

He exhibited in group shows from 1946 (first exhibiting at the age of 20 at II Exposição Geral da Academia de Música e Belas Artes da Sociedade Nacional de Belas Artes) and had his first solo exhibition in 1950. He exhibited all over Portugal as well as in England, Denmark, Poland and France. He was initially linked with Neorealism. In 1968 he collaborated with Patrick Swift and opened the Porches Pottery. As a writer his published works include: Pintura incómoda (1965), Almada e o número (1977), and Imagens da imagem (1977). He was very active in the arts holding various positions that included Director-General of the State Secretariat for Culture (1976–78), Director of The National Theatre D. Maria II, president of the Academy of Music and Fine Arts Luísa Todi(website), and the first Director of IADE (Institute of Visual Arts & Design website). Among his various awards he was awarded the Medalha de Honra da Cidade (Freedom of the City), Setúbal, "Chevalier et Officier de L'Ordre du Mérite" (Ordre national du Mérite) by the French government, and Order of Saint James of the Sword (a Portuguese Order of Chivalry). The Lima de Freitas School in Setúbal is named in his honour. He was also a Master Freemason.
