= Coky Giedroyc =

British film director (born 1963)

- Born: Mary Rose Helen Giedroyc; 6 February 1963 (age 63); Kowloon, British Hong Kong
- Occupation: Director
- Years active: 1988–present
- Spouse: Thomas Bowyer-Smyth (m. 1998)
- Children: 3
- Father: Michal Giedroyc
- Relatives: Mel Giedroyc (sister); Philip Parham (brother-in-law)

Mary Rose Helen "Coky" Giedroyc (/ˈkoʊki ˈɡɛdrɔɪtʃ/; born 6 February 1963) is an English director known for her work on Women Talking Dirty, The Virgin Queen, The Nativity, and Penny Dreadful.

== Early life ==
Giedroyc was born in Kowloon on 6 February 1963. She grew up in Leatherhead, Surrey. Her father was Michal Giedroyc, a historian of Polish-Lithuanian descent from the aristocratic Giedroyć family, who came to England in 1947. Her mother, Rosy, is of English descent. Her younger sister, Mel Giedroyc, is a television presenter. Her other sister, Kasia, is a children's writer who later married diplomat Philip Parham. She attended Bristol University, where she first began to make films.

== Career ==
Giedroyc has directed several films, including Women Talking Dirty and Stella Does Tricks; she is best known for her work directing television dramas, which have included Wuthering Heights, The Virgin Queen, Oliver Twist, Fear of Fanny, Carrie's War, and three episodes of Blackpool.

In 2007, she was nominated, with Paula Milne and Paul Rutman, for a Best Drama Serial BAFTA Award for The Virgin Queen. In 2010, her directing work for the BBC television series The Nativity was praised by critics, although the story portrayed some controversial elements that caused debate between Christians due to its modern dramatisations of the birth of Christ.

Giedroyc directed A Study in Pink, originally filmed as a 60-minute pilot for the television series Sherlock, which was written by Steven Moffat. The BBC decided not to broadcast the episode because they wished to change the broadcast length to 90 minutes. However, the pilot was released on the DVD of the first series, and it proved to be slightly different from the final version. She has also directed BBC's The Hour and What Remains. Giedroyc directed two episodes of the 2014 Showtime horror television series Penny Dreadful.

On 20 December 2015, Giedroyc directed the live television production of The Sound of Music, starring Kara Tointon as Maria, and her sister Mel Giedroyc as Frau Schmidt. The two-and-a-half-hour ITV transmission was the first musical to be broadcast live on national television in the UK, and had a cast and crew of more than 400 and 177 costumes.

In 2018, it was announced Giedroyc would direct How to Build a Girl, based upon the novel of the same name by Caitlin Moran, who also wrote the film's screenplay alongside John Niven. Beanie Feldstein, Alfie Allen, Paddy Considine, Sarah Solemani, Joanna Scanlan, Arinze Kene and Frank Dillane will star in the film.

In June 2021, Giedroyc won her second BAFTA for Best Series for her work on Channel 4's Save Me Too, written and starring Lennie James.

In 2022, it was announced that Giedroyc would direct the film Greatest Days, which was released in the summer of 2023. The film is a feature adaptation of The Band musical featuring the songs of Take That.

== Personal life ==
Giedroyc married her first husband at 21, and they had a son together before divorcing. In 1998, she married production designer Sir Thomas Weyland Bowyer-Smyth, 15th Baronet, with whom she has two children.

== Filmography ==
=== Film ===
Year	Title	Notes
1996	Stella Does Tricks	
1999	Women Talking Dirty	
2019	How to Build a Girl	
2023	Greatest Days	

=== Television ===
Year	Title	Notes
1990	The Media Show	Episode: "DIY Media"
1992	TV Hell	TV special
1992	Rock Bottom	TV film
1995	Aristophanes: The Gods Are Laughing	TV film
1996–99	Murder Most Horrid	3 episodes
2000–02	Silent Witness	3 episodes
2001–03	Murder in Mind	2 episodes
2002	Helen West	Episode: "Shadow Play"
2004	Carrie's War	TV film
2004	William and Mary	2 episodes
2004	Blackpool	3 episodes
2006	The Virgin Queen	2 episodes
2006	Fear of Fanny	TV film
2007	Oliver Twist	5 episodes
2009	Wuthering Heights	2 episodes
2010	Sherlock	Episode: "Unaired Pilot"
2010	The Nativity	4 episodes
2011	The Hour	2 episodes
2013	Spies of Warsaw	4 episodes
2013	What Remains	4 episodes
2014	Penny Dreadful	2 episodes
2014	The Killing	Episode: "Truth Asunder"
2014	Reckless	Episode: "Fifty-One Percent"
2017	Harlots	3 episodes
2017	Gypsy	2 episodes
2018	Seven Seconds	1 episode
