= La Bruyère, Belgium =

Municipality in Namur Province, Wallonia, Belgium

La Bruyère Les Brouyires (Walloon)
- Municipality
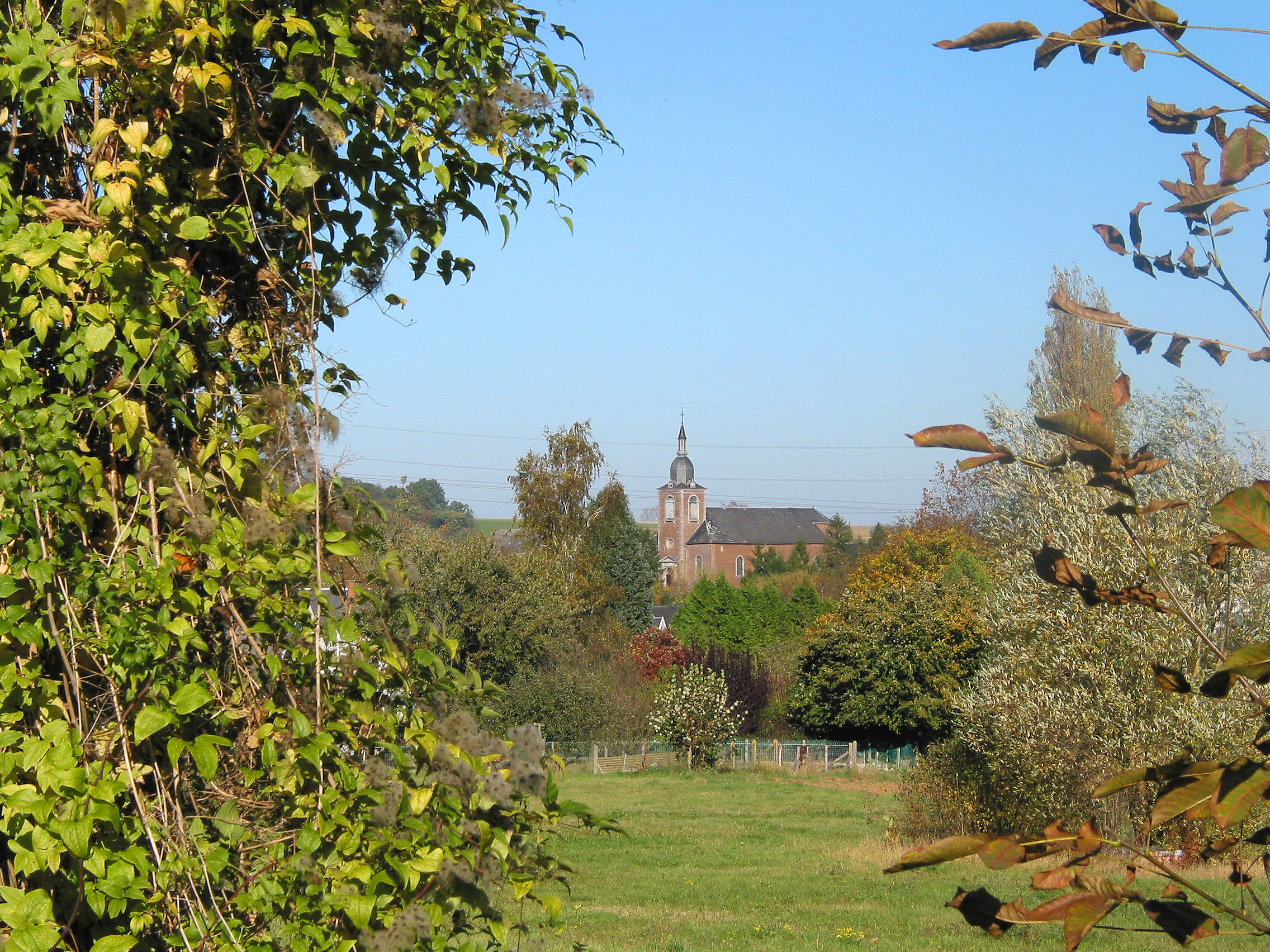

- Flag Coat of arms

- Location of La Bruyère in Namur Province
- Interactive map of La Bruyère
- Location in Belgium
- Coordinates: 50°30′N 04°48′E
- Country: Belgium
- Community: French Community
- Region: Wallonia
- Province: Namur
- Arrondissement: Namur

Government
  - Mayor: Yves Depas (PS)
  - Governing parties: Ecolo - D&B - PS

Area
  - Total: 53.04 km^{2} (20.48 sq mi)

Population (2018-01-01)
  - Total: 9,226
  - Density: 173.9/km^{2} (450.5/sq mi)
- Postal codes: 5080-5081
- NIS code: 92141
- Area codes: 081
- Website: www.labruyère.be

La Bruyère (French: [la bʁɥijɛʁ] or [la bʁujɛʁ]; Walloon: Les Brouyires) is a municipality of Wallonia located in the province of Namur, Belgium.

The municipality is composed of the following districts: Bovesse, Émines, Meux, Rhisnes, Saint-Denis-Bovesse, Villers-lez-Heest, and Warisoulx. Rhisnes is the administrative seat of the municipality.

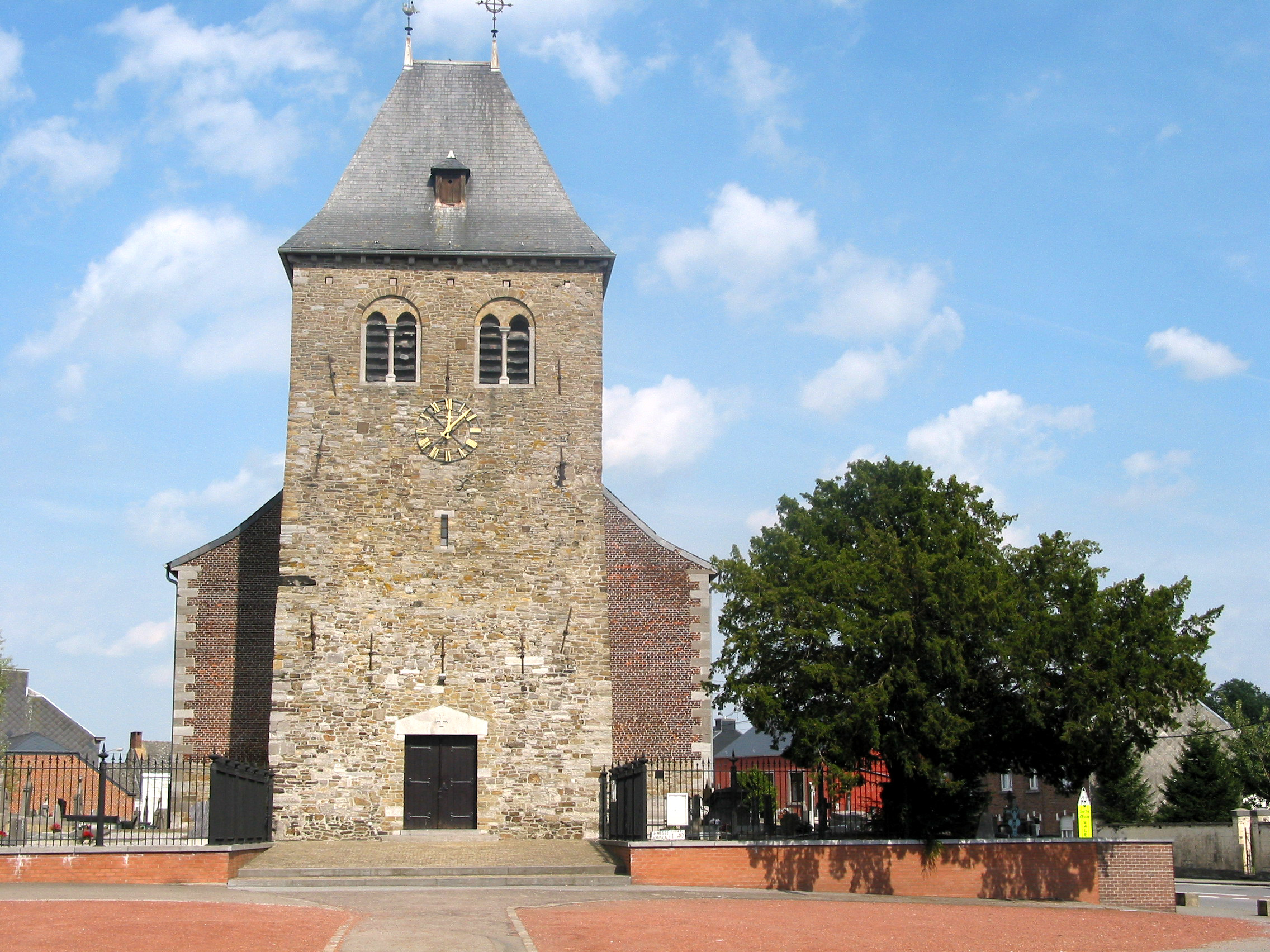
Saint-Denis-Bovesse (La Bruyère), the church.

== See also ==
- List of protected heritage sites in La Bruyère, Belgium
