= Michal Giedroyc =

British aircraft designer

Michał Jan Henryk Giedroyc (25 January 1929 – 29 December 2017) was a Polish-Lithuanian aristocrat who later became a naturalised British citizen and aircraft designer.

Giedroyc was born on 25 January 1929 in Łobzów, Poland (today Labzova in Belarus). His father Tadeusz was a politician, since 1938 Polish senator. His mother was Anna Dunin-Szostakowska. In 1940, he and most of the family were deported to a Siberian Gulag by the Soviet NKVD after the Soviet invasion of Poland. They escaped to Iran in 1942 and travelled to Britain in 1947. He studied at the University of London and then worked designing aircraft at Vickers Aerospace. He later moved into economic consultancy. He became an expert in the history of medieval Lithuania. His memoirs were published in 2010 as Crater's Edge. He died on 29 December, 2017 age 88 from pulmonary embolism.

His daughters include comedian and television presenter Mel Giedroyc and director Coky Giedroyc.

== See also ==
- Giedroyć
