= Alexis Guedroitz =

Belgian Russian-language professor and interpreter

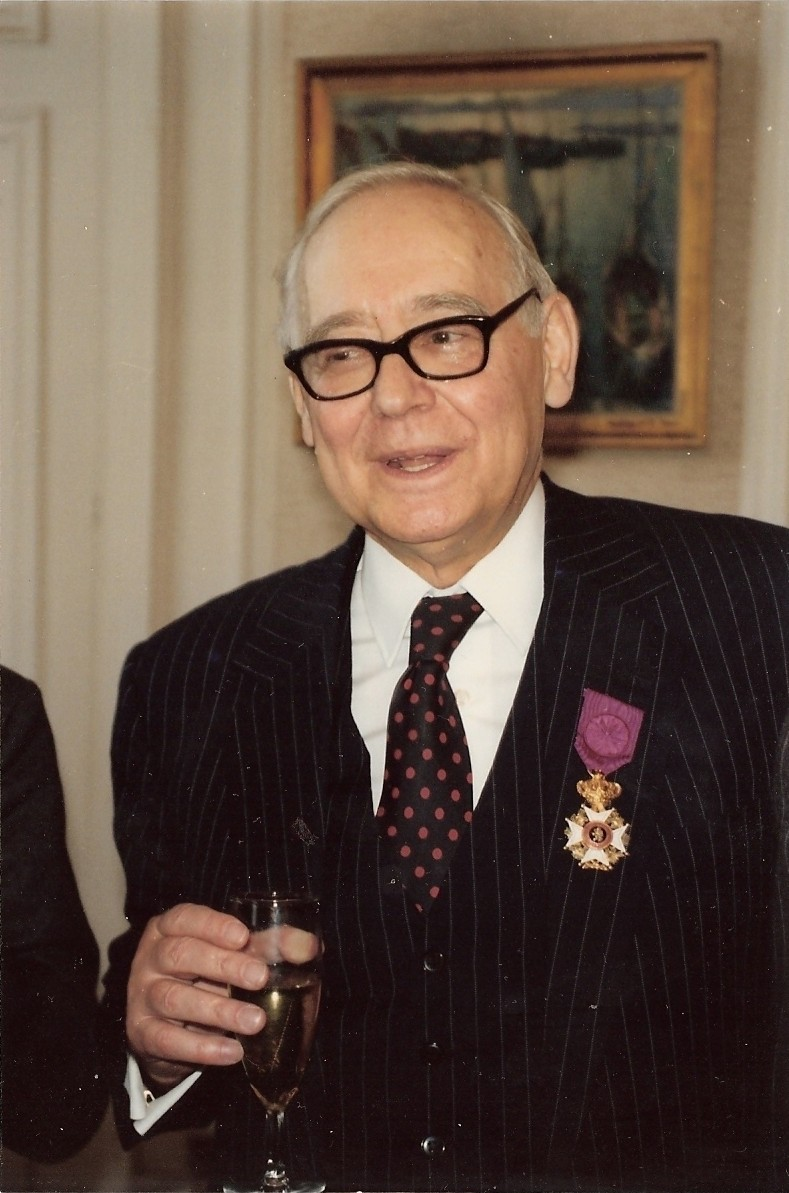
- Guedroitz in 1991
- Born: Alexis Nicolaevich Guedroitz; 9 June 1923; Pančevo, Serbia
- Died: 1 February 1992 (aged 68); Brussels, Belgium
- Occupations: Professor of Russian language and literature, interpreter, adapter, writer and lecturer
- Writing career
- Language: French, Russian

Prince Alexis Nicolaevich Guedroitz (9 June 1923 – 1 February 1992) was a Belgian professor of Russian Language and Literature (Ecole de Guerre; Centre Nucléaire de Mol; Higher Institute of Interpreters and Translators Marie Haps; Higher Institute of the City of Brussels) and an interpreter who participated in several meetings between Soviet and Belgian politicians, such as Spaak-Khrushchev (1961), Spaak-Kosygin (1969), Harmel-Gromyko (1972), and the official visit of the King and Queen of the Belgians in USSR (1975).

He was also one of the founders and delegates in Belgium of the International Dostoevsky Society (IDS).

== Biography ==
=== Childhood ===
Born in exile in Pancevo, Serbia, in 1923, Alexis Guedroitz was the son of the Russian Prince Nicholas Wladimirovich Guedroitz and his wife Alexandra Gregorievna Strigewsky. Shortly after his birth, his father, a young officer of the Imperial Guard, died from wounds of war. The young Alexis, his sister Olga (future wife of Count Eric de Diesbach Belleroche), and their half-brother Andrey were raised by their mother, who remarried in Brussels to George Iovleff.

=== Private life ===
Alexis Guedroitz married twice. First, in Dublin in 1948, he married Oonagh Ryan, with whom he had a daughter, actress Ania Guedroitz; then, in Brussels in 1962, he married Countess Jeanne Marie de Hemricourt de Grunne, with whom he had two sons, Nicolas and Michel Guedroitz.

== Theatrical adaptations ==
- 1962-1963: Boris Godunov by Alexander Pushkin - Rideau de Bruxelles (new adaptation)
- 1963-1964: Ivanov by Anton Chekhov - Rideau de Bruxelles (adaptation)
- 1964-1965: The Spirit underground by Fyodor Dostoevsky - Rideau de Bruxelles (brought to the stage)
- 1966-1967: Uncle Vanya by Anton Chekhov - Rideau de Bruxelles (new adaptation)
- 1967-1968: The Idiot by Fyodor Dostoevsky - Rideau de Bruxelles (brought to the stage)
- 1969-1970: Crime and Punishment by Fyodor Dostoevsky - Rideau de Bruxelles (stage adaptation)
- 1972-1973: A Month in the Country by Ivan Turgenev - Theatre Royal du Parc (adaptation)
- 1973-1974: The Brothers Karamazov by Fyodor Dostoevsky - Rideau de Bruxelles (adaptation)
- 1976-1977: The Cherry Orchard by Anton Chekhov - Theatre Royal du Parc (adaptation)
- 1979-1980: The Gambler by Fyodor Dostoevsky - Rideau de Bruxelles (adaptation)
- 1979-1980: The Seagull by Anton Chekhov - Theatre Royal des Galleries (new adaptation)
- 1987-1988: Ivanov by Anton Chekhov - Theatre Royal du Parc (adaptation)
- 1988-1989: Hoop by Viktor Slavkin - Rideau de Bruxelles (French text)

== Literary adaptations ==
- 1973: A Month in the Country by Ivan Turgenev (Translator: Alexis Guedroitz - Paris: Jacques Antoine)
- 1975: Uncle Vanya by Anton Chekhov (Translator : Alexis Guedroitz - Paris)
- 1980: The Gambler by Fyodor Dostoyevsky (Adapter : Alexis Guedroitz - Brussels: Rideau de Bruxelles - Collection: Cahiers du Rideau)

== Books as author ==
- 195?: The Triumph of Stephan Pasternacq
- 1959: Terrain vague
- 196?: The Concerto in D
- 1974: The Nobel Prize in Russian literature: from Bunin to Solzhenitsyn
- 1985: Faire: un verbe à tout faire

== Periodicals ==
- 1973: Turgenev, The Legacy of Pushkin - Alexis Guedroitz in Revue Générale - excerpt from the March issue
- 1978: Leo Tolstoy or creative introspection - Alexis Guedroitz in Revue Générale - excerpt from No. 10, October

== Press Releases ==
- Hoop at Rideau: poetry of glasnost
- The death of Alexis Guedroitz. A needed voice that stops

== Bibliography ==
- The new dictionary of the Belgians (A-H) from 1830 to our days - Delzenne et Houyoux - Le cri dictionnaire - La Libre Belgique RTBF - ISBN 2-87106-212-9

== Decorations ==
- Officer of the Order of Academic Palms (France)
- Officer of the Order of Leopold (Belgium)

== See also ==
- Giedroyć
