= Giedrius =

- Gender: Male

Origin
- Region of origin: Lithuania

Giedrius is a Lithuanian masculine given name and may refer to the following individuals:

- Giedrius Andriunaitis (born 1991), Lithuanian swimmer
- Giedrius Arlauskis (born 1987), Lithuanian football goalkeeper
- Giedrius Barevičius (born 1976), Lithuanian football midfielder
- Giedrius Gustas (born 1980), Lithuanian basketball point guard and shooting guard
- Giedrius Gužys (born 1976), Lithuanian sport sailor
- Giedrius Kuprevičius (born 1944), Lithuanian composer and music educator
- Giedrius Matulevičius (born 1997), Lithuanian footballer
- Giedrius Savickas (born 1991), Lithuanian actor
- Giedrius Staniulis (born 1991), Lithuanian basketball player
- Giedrius Titenis (born 1989), Lithuanian swimmer and Olympic competitor
- Giedrius Tomkevičius (born 1984), Lithuanian football midfielder
- Giedrius Žutautas (born 1974), Lithuanian football defender
